= List of converts to Christianity =

Converts to Christianity
Total population: According to various scholars and sources Pentecostalism – a Protestant Christian movement – is the fastest growing religion in the world; this growth is primarily due to religious conversion.; Due primarily to conversion, Christianity grew in South Korea from 2.0% in 1945 to 29.3% in 2010.; Protestantism continues to experience steady growth as a result of conversion in Asia, Latin America, the Muslim world, and Oceania.

The following is a list of notable people who converted to Christianity from a different religion or no religion. This article addresses only past voluntary professions of faith by the individuals listed, and is not intended to address ethnic, cultural, or other considerations such as Marriage. Certain people listed here may be lapsed or former converts, or their current religious identity may be ambiguous, uncertain or disputed. Such cases are noted in their list entries.

== Agnosticism or atheism ==
- Steve Beren - former member of the Socialist Workers Party (United States) who became a Christian conservative politician
- Anders Borg - Sweden's minister of finance
- Kirk Cameron - actor, star of Growing Pains (former atheist)
- Bruce Cockburn - Canadian folk/rock guitarist and singer/songwriter (former agnostic)
- Francis Collins - physician-geneticist, noted for his landmark discoveries of disease genes; director of the National Human Genome Research Institute (former atheist)
- Larry Flynt - American publisher and pornographer; briefly converted under the auspice of Ruth Carter Stapleton
- Bo Giertz - Swedish Confessional Lutheran bishop, theologian, and writer (former atheist)
- Joy Gresham - American writer and wife of C. S. Lewis (former atheist)
- Anna Haycraft - raised in Auguste Comte's atheistic "church of humanity", but became a conservative Catholic in adulthood
- Ignace Lepp - French psychiatrist whose parents were freethinkers and who joined the Communist party at age fifteen; broke with the party in 1937 and eventually became a Catholic priest
- Félix Leseur - doctor turned priest; his conversion, in part, came by efforts of his wife who was declared a Servant of God by the Catholic Church
- Khang Khek Leu (also known as Comrade Duch) - Cambodian director of Phnom Penh's infamous Tuol Sleng detention center
- C. S. Lewis - Oxford professor and writer; known for The Chronicles of Narnia series, and for his apologetic Mere Christianity
- Shelley Lubben - former pornographic actress, current author and executive director of the Pink Cross Foundation, anti-pornography activist
- Gabriel Marcel - French philosopher and playwright (former agnostic)
- Norma McCorvey - "Jane Roe" in Roe v. Wade
- Alister McGrath - biochemist and Christian theologian; founder of "scientific theology" and critic of Richard Dawkins in his book Dawkins' God: Genes, Memes, and the Meaning of Life
- Czesław Miłosz - Nobel prize-winning poet
- Nina Karin Monsen - Norwegian moral philosopher and author who grew up in a humanist family, and later converted to Christianity through philosophic thinking
- Crissy Moran - former pornographic actress and current anti-pornography activist
- Lacey Mosley - vocalist and lyricist for Alternative metal band Flyleaf
- William J. Murray - author and son of atheist activist Madalyn Murray O'Hair
- Bernard Nathanson - medical doctor who was a founding member of NARAL, later becoming a pro-life proponent
- Marvin Olasky - former Marxist turned Christian conservative; edits the Christian World magazine
- George R. Price - geneticist who became an Evangelical Christian and wrote about the New Testament; later moderated his evangelistic tendencies and switched from religious writing to working with the homeless
- Anne Rice - author of Interview with the Vampire
- Edith Stein - phenomenologist philosopher who converted to Catholicism and became a Discalced Carmelite nun; declared a saint by John Paul II
- Peter Steele - lead singer of Type O Negative
- Lee Strobel - author of The Case for Christ (former atheist)
- Allen Tate - American poet, essayist and social commentator, and Poet Laureate Consultant in Poetry to the Library of Congress
- František Vyskočil – Czech neuroscientist
- J. Warner Wallace - American homicide detective, apologist, and writer of anti-atheist book God's Crime Scene (2015)
- Evelyn Waugh - British writer (former agnostic)
- Fay Weldon - British novelist and feminist
- Monty White - British Young Earth Creationist (former atheist)
- John C. Wright - science fiction author

== Baha'i Faith ==
- John Ford Coley - American artist and author

== Buddhism ==
- David Yonggi Cho - Korean Christian leader; senior pastor of the Yoido Full Gospel Church
- Mitsuo Fuchida - Imperial Japanese Navy Air Service captain noted for involvement in the attack on Pearl Harbor; became a Christian evangelist
- Jaruvan Maintaka - auditor-general of the Kingdom of Thailand
- Chieko N. Okazaki - Relief Society counselor (convert to The Church of Jesus Christ of Latter-day Saints)
- Talduwe Somarama - former Buddhist monk and assassin
- Charlie Soong - Chinese missionary
- Paul Williams - professor in Indian Religions at the University of Bristol, England; was a Buddhist for many years but has since converted to Roman Catholicism

== Cao Dai ==
- Phan Thị Kim Phúc - subject of a Pulitzer Prize-winning photograph by "Nick" Ut; now heads a fund for children victims of war

== Confucianism ==
- Hong Sa-ik - Korean-Japanese World War II general who was executed for war crimes after the war
- Heup Young Kim - theologian and member of the International Society for Science and Religion
- Nakamura Masanao - member of the Meirokusha who was baptized; largely retained the Confucian ideals that were compatible with Christianity
- Sun Myung Moon - raised Korean Confucianist before his family (including himself) converted to Presbyterianism, before later he founded Unification Movement (Christian New religious movement) later his life
- Xi Shengmo - Chinese Christian leader

== Druze faith ==
- Abillama clan - prominent noble Levantine family and clan, converted from the Druze faith to Christianity
- Khazen family - prominent noble Levantine family and clan based in Keserwan District; converted to the Maronite Church
- Selwa Roosevelt - chief of Protocol of the United States for almost seven years (1982–1989; longer than anyone has ever served in that position); from Lebanese Druze background, and converted to Methodism
- Mohamed Alí Seineldín - Lebanese Argentine army colonel, converted from Druzism to Roman Catholicism during his youth
- Nada Nadim Prouty - Lebanese former intelligence professional; born into the Druze faith; later in life, converted to Catholicism

== Hinduism ==
- Krishna Mohan Banerjee - Indian educator, linguist, and missionary
- Michael Madhusudan Dutt - Bengali poet
- Bobby Jindal - American governor of Louisiana
- Rabi Maharaj - Trinidadian-born Indian author and evangelist
- Mohini - Indian actress
- Sister Nirmala - Indian religious sister
- Krishna Pal - first Indian convert to Baptist Christianity and preacher
- Devasahayam Pillai - Indian layman and martyr
- Predhuman K. Joseph Dhar - Indian author and social worker
- Francina Sorabji - Indian educator
- Puroshottam Choudhary - Telugu poet and pastor
- Henry Alfred Krishnapillai - Tamil poet
- Mathangi Arulpragasam - British-Sri Lankan singer-songwriter

== Islam ==
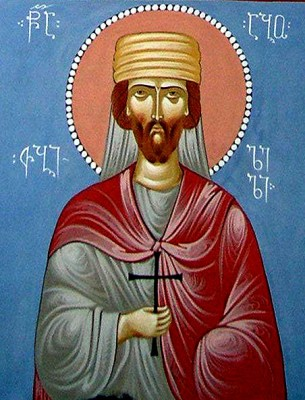
Abo of Tiflis, a Christian activist and the Patron AMR Saint of the city of Tbilisi, Georgia

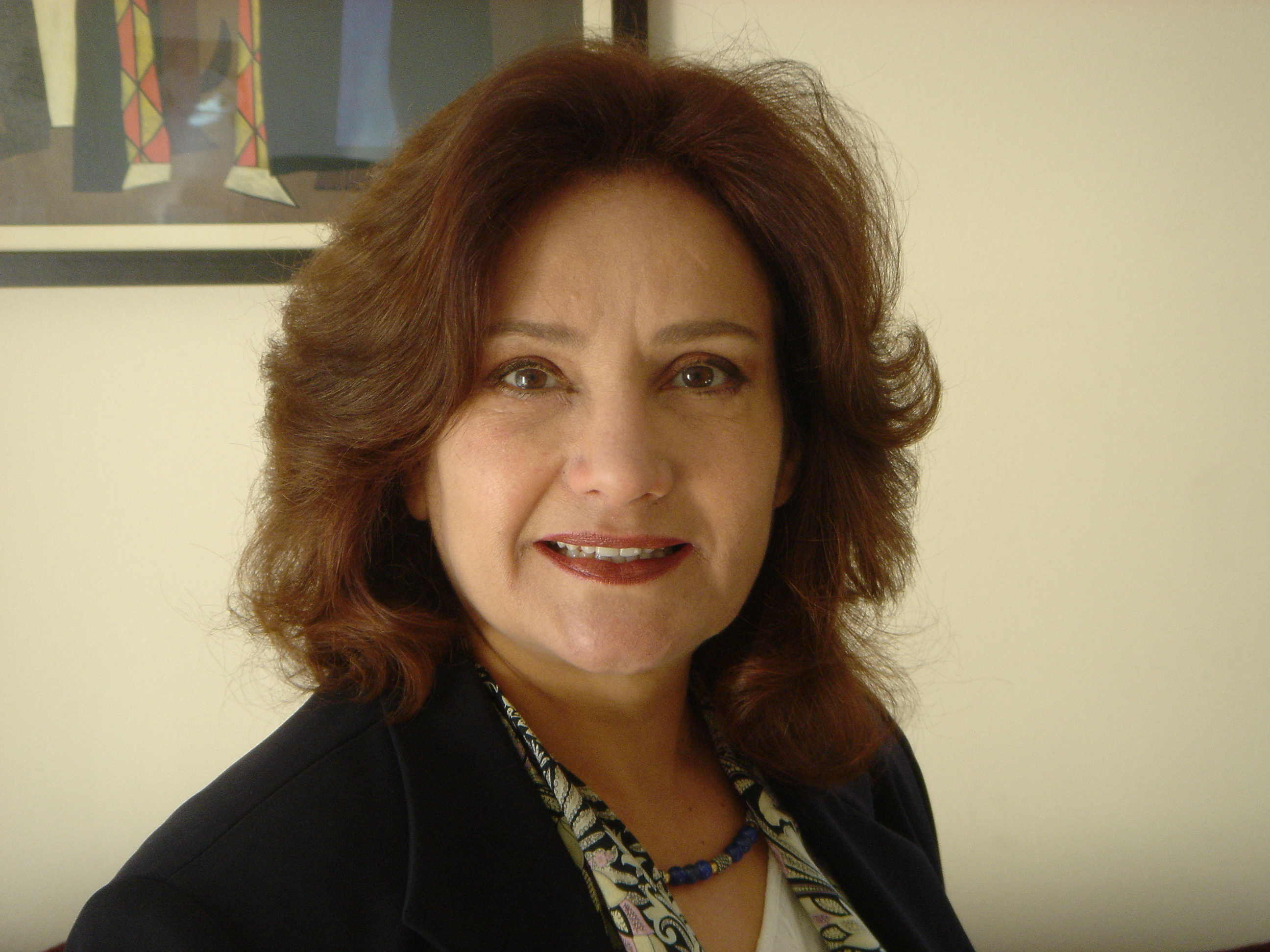
Nonie Darwish, an Egyptian American writer and public speaker

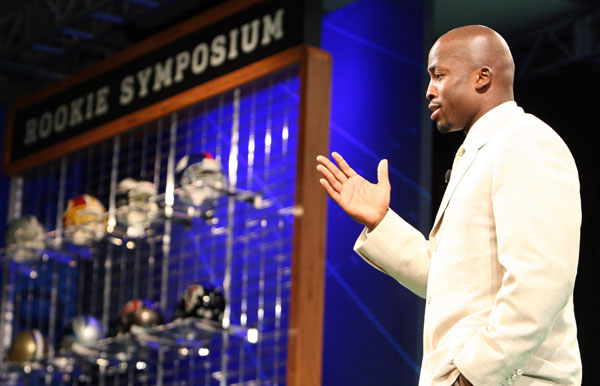
Akbar Gbaja-Biamila, an American football player.

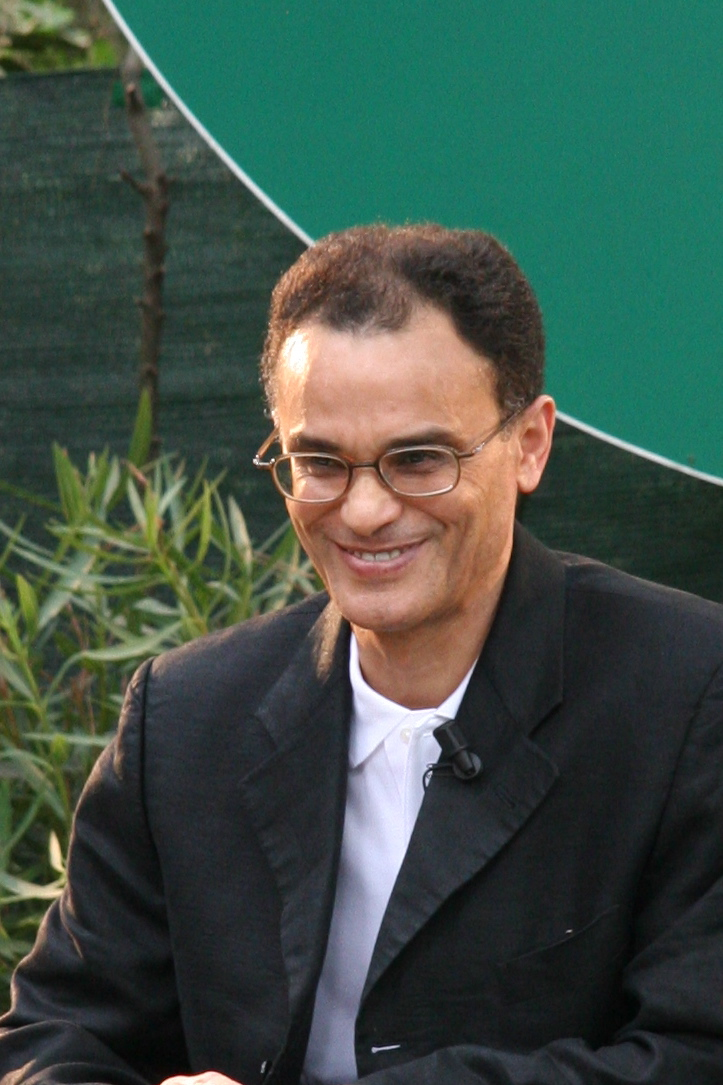
Italian journalist Magdi Allam converted to Roman Catholicism during the Vatican's 2008 Easter vigil service presided over by Pope Benedict XVI.

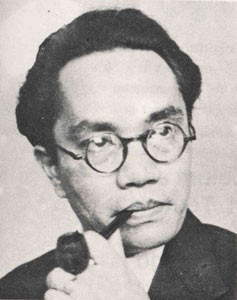
Born into a Muslim Batak family, Indonesian Prime Minister Amir Sjarifuddin converted to Christianity in 1931, upon which his fervently Islamic mother committed suicide.

=== A ===
- Aslan Abashidze - leader of the Ajarian Autonomous Republic in western Georgia; born into a renowned Muslim Ajarian family, a branch of the Abashidze princely house
- Mohammed Sheikh Abdiraman - Somali convert to Christianity who was shot by al Shabaab members
- Abo of Tiflis - Christian activist and the patron saint of the city of Tbilisi, Georgia
- Taysir Abu Saada - former member of the PLO and the founder of the christian ministry Hope For Ishmael after he converted to christianity; Yasir Arafat's personal driver
- Abraham of Bulgaria - martyr and saint of the Russian Orthodox Church
- Rotimi Adebari - Nigerian-born Irish politician, first black mayor in Ireland
- St. Adolphus - Christian martyr who was put to death along with his brother, John, by Abd ar-Rahman II, Caliph of Córdoba for apostasy
- Mehmet Ali Ağca - Turkish-born; attempted to murder Pope John Paul II in 1981; became a Catholic during his time in prison
- Al-Mu'eiyyad - Abbasid prince and third son of Abbasid caliph, Al-Mutawakkil;was converted to Christianity along with his three confidants by St. Theodore of Edessa, accepting the name "John" upon baptism
- Jabalah ibn al-Aiham - last ruler of the Ghassanid state in Syria and Jordan in the seventh century AD; after the Islamic conquest of Levant he converted to Islam in AD 638; reverted to Christianity later and lived in Anatolia until he died in AD 645
- Ibrahim Ben Ali - soldier, physician and one of the earliest American settlers of Turkish origin
- Amina Muse Ali - Somali convert to Christianity who was shot by al Shabaab members
- Mohammed Ahmed Ali - Somali convert to Christianity who was murdered by al Shabaab members
- Magdi Allam (baptized as Magdi Cristiano Allam) - Italy's most famous Islamic affairs journalist
- Zachariah Anani - former Sunni Muslim Lebanese militia fighter
- Matthew Ashimolowo - Nigerian-born British pastor and evangelist
- Aurelius and Natalia - Christian martyrs who were put to death during the reign of Abd ar-Rahman II, Caliph of Córdoba for apostasy
- Maria Aurora of Spiegel - born as Fatima, mistress of Augustus II of Saxony
- Johannes Avetaranian (born Muhammad Shukri Efendi) - Christian missionary and Turkish descendant of Prophet Muhammad

=== B ===
- Josephine Bakhita - Roman Catholic saint from Darfur, Sudan
- Sarah Balabagan - Filipina prisoner in the United Arab Emirates 1994–96 whose case caused controversy
- Fathima Rifqa Bary - young woman of Sri Lankan descent who drew international attention in 2009 when, at age 16, she ran away from her Ohio home saying that her Muslim parents are going to kill her for becoming a Christian
- Sheikh Ahmed Barzani - Head of Barzani Tribe in Iraqi Kurdistan and older brother of Mustafa Barzani, Kurdish nationalist leader; announced his conversion to Christianity in 1931 during the anti-government uprising
- Simeon Bekbulatovich - khan of Qasim Khanate
- Alexander Bekovich-Cherkassky - Russian officer of Circassian origin who led the first Russian military expedition into Central Asia
- Francis Bok - Sudanese-American activist, converted to Islam from Christianity; later returned to his Christian faith
- Jean-Bédel Bokassa - Central African Republic emperor (from Christianity to Islam back to Christianity)
- Dr. Thomas Yayi Boni - president of Benin
- Sayed Borhan khan - khan of Qasim Khanate 1627–1679
- Bilquis Sheikh - prominent member of a noble Muslim Hayat Khattar family from Pakistan and wife of then Minister of Interior Lt Gen Khalid Masud Sheikh; known for her high-profile conversion from Islam to Christianity

=== C ===
- Casilda of Toledo - venerated as a saint of the Catholic Church. According to her legend, St. Casilda, a daughter of a Muslim king of Toledo (called Almacrin or Almamun), showed special kindness to Christian prisoners by carrying bread hidden in her clothes to feed them.
- George XI of Kartli - ruled Kartli, eastern Georgia
- Djibril Cissé - French soccer player of Ivorian descent
- Hansen Clarke - the U.S. representative for Michigan's 13th congressional district
- Eldridge Cleaver - author, prominent American civil rights leader, and key member of the Black Panther Party; converted to Mormonism
- Constantine the African - Baghdad-educated Muslim who died in 1087 as a Christian monk at Monte Cassino

=== D ===
- Nonie Darwish - Egyptian American writer and public speaker
- Hassan Dehqani-Tafti - Anglican bishop of Iran 1961–1990
- Mehdi Dibaj - Iranian pastor and Christian activist
- Momolu Dukuly - politician in Liberia; left Islam and embraced Christianity before he became foreign minister

=== E ===
- Estevanico - Berber originally from Morocco and one of the early explorers of the Southwestern United States

=== F ===
- Jacob Frank - 18th-century Jewish religious leader who claimed to be the reincarnation of the self-proclaimed messiah Sabbatai Zevi, and also of King David; publicly converted to Islam in 1757 and later to Christianity at Poland in 1759, but actually presented himself as the Messiah of a syncretic derivation of Shabbatai Zevi's Messianism now referred to as Frankism

=== G ===
- Mark A. Gabriel - Egyptian Islamic scholar and writer
- Daveed Gartenstein-Ross - counter-terrorism expert and attorney (from Judaism to Islam to Christianity)
- Akbar Gbaja-Biamila - American football player
- Kabeer Gbaja-Biamila - American football defensive end who was drafted by the Green Bay Packers and is currently a free agent
- Ruffa Gutierrez - Filipina actress, model and former beauty queen (from Christianity to Islam back to Christianity)

=== H ===
- Umar ibn Hafsun - leader of anti-Umayyad dynasty forces in southern Iberia. Hafsun converted to Christianity with his sons and ruled over several mountain valleys for nearly forty years, having the castle Bobastro as his residence
- Naveed Afzal Haq - Pakistani American charged for the July 2006 Seattle Jewish Federation shooting; converted to Christianity in December 2005, but reverted to Islam by the time of the shooting
- Mohammed Hegazy - first Egyptian Muslim convert to Christianity to seek official recognition of his conversion from the Egyptian Government. Threats force Egyptian convert to hide, MAGGIE MICHAEL, Associated Press Writer Sat August 11,
- Aben Humeya (born Fernando de Valor) - Morisco chief who was crowned the emir of Andalusia by his followers and led the Morisco Revolt against Philip II of Spain
- Mariam Muhina Hussein - Somali convert to Christianity who was murdered by al Shabaab members after discovering she had six Bibles

=== I ===
- Tunch Ilkin - former American football player
- Qadry Ismail - former American football player
- Raghib Ismail - former American football player

=== J ===
- Ubayd-Allah ibn Jahsh - brother of Zaynab bint Jahsh, the wife of Prophet Muhammad; one of the male Sahaba (companions of the Prophet)
- Esther John - Pakistani Christian nurse She is counted in ten most famous Christian martyrs of the present day.
- Lina Joy - Malaysian convert to Christianity; the desire to have her conversion recognized was the subject of a court case in Malaysia
- Don Juan of Persia - late 16th- and early 17th-century figure in Iran and Spain; settled in Spain where he became a Roman Catholic

=== K ===
- Alexander Kazembek - Russian Orientalist, historian and philologist of Azeri origin
- Mathieu Kérékou - president of Benin (from Christianity to Islam back to Christianity)
- Omar Khalafe - Somali convert to Christianity who was shot by al Shabaab members
- Kitty Kirkpatrick - born in India and brought up as Shia Muslim
- Emir Kusturica - Bosnian Serb filmmaker and actor

=== L ===
- Imad ud-din Lahiz - prolific Islamic writer, preacher and Qur'anic translator
- Dr. Nur Luke - Uyghur Bible translator

=== M ===
- Fadhma Aït Mansour - mother of French writers Jean Amrouche and Taos Amrouche
- Sake Dean Mahomed - Indian traveller, surgeon and entrepreneur who introduced the Indian take-away curry house restaurant in Britain, and was the first Indian to have written a book in the English language.
- Josef Mässrur (born Ghäsim Khan) - missionary to Chinese Turkestan with the Mission Union of Sweden
- Carlos Menem - former president of Argentina; raised Muslim but converted to Roman Catholicism, a constitutional requirement for accessing the presidency until 1994
- St. George El Mozahem - coptic saint
- Yadegar Mokhammad of Kazan - last khan of Kazan Khanate (1552)
- Muhsin Muhammad - current American football player for the Carolina Panthers, raised in a Muslim household, later converted to Christianity
- Paul Mulla - Turkish scholar and professor of Islamic Studies at the Pontifical Oriental Institute

=== N ===
- Marina Nemat - Canadian author of Iranian descent and former political prisoner of the Iranian government; born into a Christian family, converted to Islam in order to avoid execution but later reverted to Christianity
- Nunilo and Alodia - pair of child martyrs from Huesca; born of a mixed marriage, they eschewed the Islam of their father in favour of their mother's Christianity

=== O ===
- Malika Oufkir - Moroccan writer, daughter of General Mohamed Oufkir, and former prisoner of King Hassan II of Morocco

=== P ===
- Shams Pahlavi - Iranian princess; elder sister of Mohammad Reza Pahlavi, shah of Iran
- Hamid Pourmand - former Iranian army colonel and lay leader of the Jama'at-e Rabbani, the Iranian branch of the Assemblies of God church in Iran

=== R ===
- Abdul Rahman - Afghan convert to Christianity who escaped the death penalty because of foreign pressure
- Stefan Razvan - Gypsy prince who ruled Moldavia for six months in 1595
- Emily Ruete (born Sayyida Salme) - princess of Zanzibar and Oman
- Ibrahim Rugova - Albanian politician; first president of Kosovo and of its leading political party, the Democratic League of Kosovo (LDK); rumored to have converted to Christianity just before his death in January 2006

=== S ===
- Nazli Sabri - Queen consort of Egypt
- Begum Samru - powerful womab of north India, ruling a large area from Sardhana, Uttar Pradesh
- James Scurry - British soldier and statesman
- Hakeem Seriki (aka Chamillionaire) - American rapper
- The Sibirsky family - the foremost of many Genghisid (Shaybanid) noble families formerly living in Russia
- The Shihab family - prominent Lebanese noble family who originally belonged to Sunni Islam and converted to Christianity at the end of the 18th century
- Walid Shoebat - American author and former member of the PLO
- Nasir Siddiki - Canadian evangelist, author, and business consultant.
- Amir Sjarifuddin - Indonesian socialist leader who later became the prime minister of Indonesia during its National Revolution.
- Skanderbeg - Albanian military leader; converted to Islam from Christianity but reverted back to Christianity later in life
- Rudolf Carl von Slatin - Anglo-Austrian soldier and administrator in the Sudan.
- Hossein Soodmand - executed for apostasy. Although born a Muslim, by 1989 Hossein had been a Christian for 25 years
- Patrick Sookhdeo - British Anglican canon

=== T ===
- Hakan Tastan and Turan Topal - Turkish Christian converts who went on trial in 2006, on charges of "allegedly insulting 'Turkishness' and inciting religious hatred against Islam"
- Maria Temryukovna - Circassian princess, and second wife to Ivan IV of Russia; born in a Muslim upbringing, and baptised into the Russian Orthodox Church in 1561
- Ghorban Tourani - former Iranian Sunni Muslim who became a Christian minister; following multiple murder threats, he was abducted and murdered on November 22, 2005

=== U ===
- Utameshgaray of Kazan - khan of Kazan Khanate

=== W ===
- George Weah - Liberian soccer player (from Christianity to Islam back to Christianity)

=== Y ===
- Mosab Hassan Yousef - son of a Hamas leader
- Mumin Abdikarim Yusuf - Somali convert to Christianity.

=== Z ===
- Zaida of Seville - refugee Muslim princess who became queen of Alfonso VI of Castile
- Saye Zerbo - president of the republic of Upper Volta (now Burkina Faso)

== Judaism ==
Christianity originated as a movement within Judaism that believed in Jesus as the Messiah. The earliest Christians were Jews or Jewish proselytes, whom historians refer to as Jewish Christians. This includes the most important figures in early Christianity, such as the Virgin Mary, John the Baptist, all twelve apostles, most of the seventy disciples, Paul the Apostle and Jesus himself. The split of Judaism and Christianity occurred gradually over the next three centuries, as the church became "more and more gentile, and less and less Jewish".

The Jewish Encyclopedia gives some statistics on conversion of Jews to Protestantism, to Roman Catholicism, and to Orthodox Christianity. According to data from the Jewish Encyclopedia, around 204,542 Jews converted to Christianity during the nineteenth century. The largest number joined the Eastern Orthodox Church, at about 74,500 converts, followed by Protestantism with approximately 72,742, and the Roman Catholic Church with around 57,300.

The 19th century saw at least 250,000 Jews convert to Christianity, according to existing records of various societies. Data from the Pew Research Center show that, as of 2013, about 1.6 million adult Americans of Jewish background—people who were raised Jewish or had at least one Jewish parent—identified themselves as Christians, most of them Protestant. According to the same data, most Americans of Jewish background who identify themselves as some sort of Christian were raised as Jews or are Jews by ancestry. According to a 2012 study, 17% of Jews in Russia identify themselves as Christians.

=== A ===
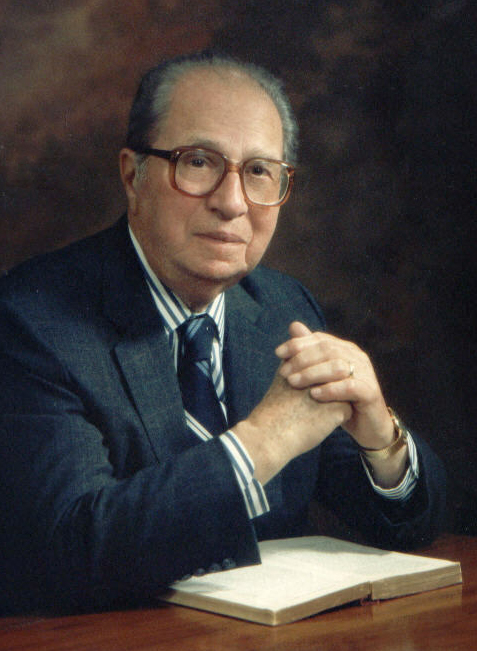
Mortimer Adler

- Abd-al-Masih (martyr) (?–died 390 AD) - convert martyred for his faith
- Abraham Abramson (1754–1811) - Prussian coiner and medallist. Born into a Jewish family, he later converted to Christianity
- Felix Aderca (1891–1962) - Romanian novelist, playwright, poet, journalist and critic, noted as a representative of rebellious modernism in the context of Romanian literature
- Mortimer J. Adler (1902–2001) - American philosopher, educator, and popular author; convert to Catholicism
- Michael Solomon Alexander (1799–1845) - first Anglican bishop of Jerusalem
- Petrus Alphonsi (?–after 1116) - physician in ordinary to King Alfonso VI of Castile
- David Assing (1787–1842) - German physician and poet, member of the Assing family
- Lovisa Augusti (1751 or 1756–1790) - opera singer and actress

=== B ===
- Friedrich Daniel Bach (1756–1830) - German painter
- Juan Alfonso de Baena (?–c. 1435) - medieval Castilian troubadour
- Michael Balint (1896–1970) - Hungarian psychoanalyst who spent most of his adult life in England. He was a proponent of the Object Relations school.
- David Baron (1855–1926) - Jewish convert to Christianity; began the Hebrew Christian Testimony to Israel missionary organization
- Jakob Salomon Bartholdy, born Jakob Salomon (1779–1825) - Prussian diplomat
- Giovanni Giuda Giona Battista - agent for the king of Poland in the 16th century. Born Jewish and later converted to Roman Catholicism.
- Rachel Beer (1858–1927) - Indian-born British newspaper editor; editor-in-chief of The Observer and The Sunday Times; converted to Christianity
- Bo Belinsky (1936–2001) - American left-handed pitcher in Major League Baseball
- Franz Friedrich Benary, aka Franz Ferdinand Benary (1805–1860) - German philologist
- Karl Albert Benary, aka Karl Albert Agathon Benary or Agathon Benary (1807–1860) - German classical scholar.
- Eduard Bendemann (1811–1845) - German painter
- Sir Julius Benedict (1804–1885) - English composer
- Theodor Benfey (1809–1881) - German philologist

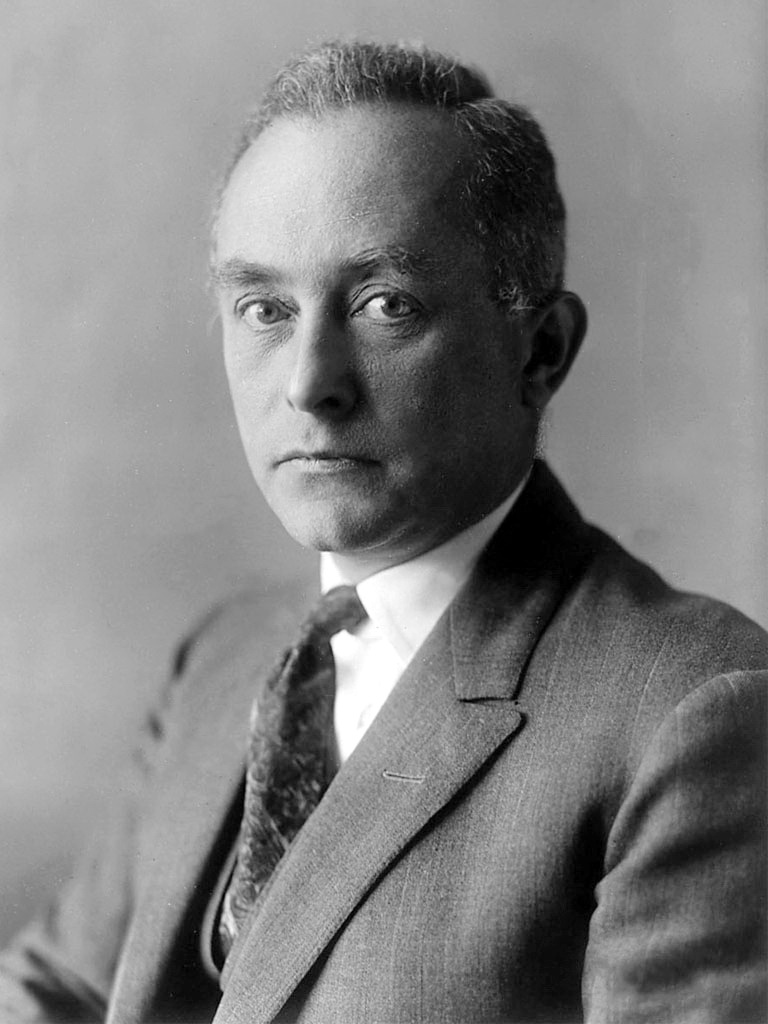
Max Born

- Michael Bernays (1834–1897) - professor of literature at Munich
- Boris Berezovsky (1946–2013) - Russian business oligarch, government official, engineer and mathematician; converted to the Eastern Orthodox Church in 1990.
- David Berkowitz (born 1953) - American serial killer
- Michael Bernays (1834–1897) - German professor of literature
- Gottfried Bernhardy (1800–1875) - German philologist and literary historian
- Marianne Beth (1889–1984) - Jewish Austrian lawyer and feminist; converted from Judaism to Protestantism
- Max Born (1882–1970) - German physicist and mathematician; winner of the 1954 Nobel Prize in Physics; although baptized a Lutheran, he was a deist throughout his life
- Ludwig Börne (1786–1837) - German political writer and satirist
- John Braham (tenor) (1774–1856) - English tenor opera star
- Moritz Wilhelm August Breidenbach (1796–1856) - German jurist
- Max Büdinger (1828–1902) - German-Austrian historian and professor of history at Vienna

=== C ===
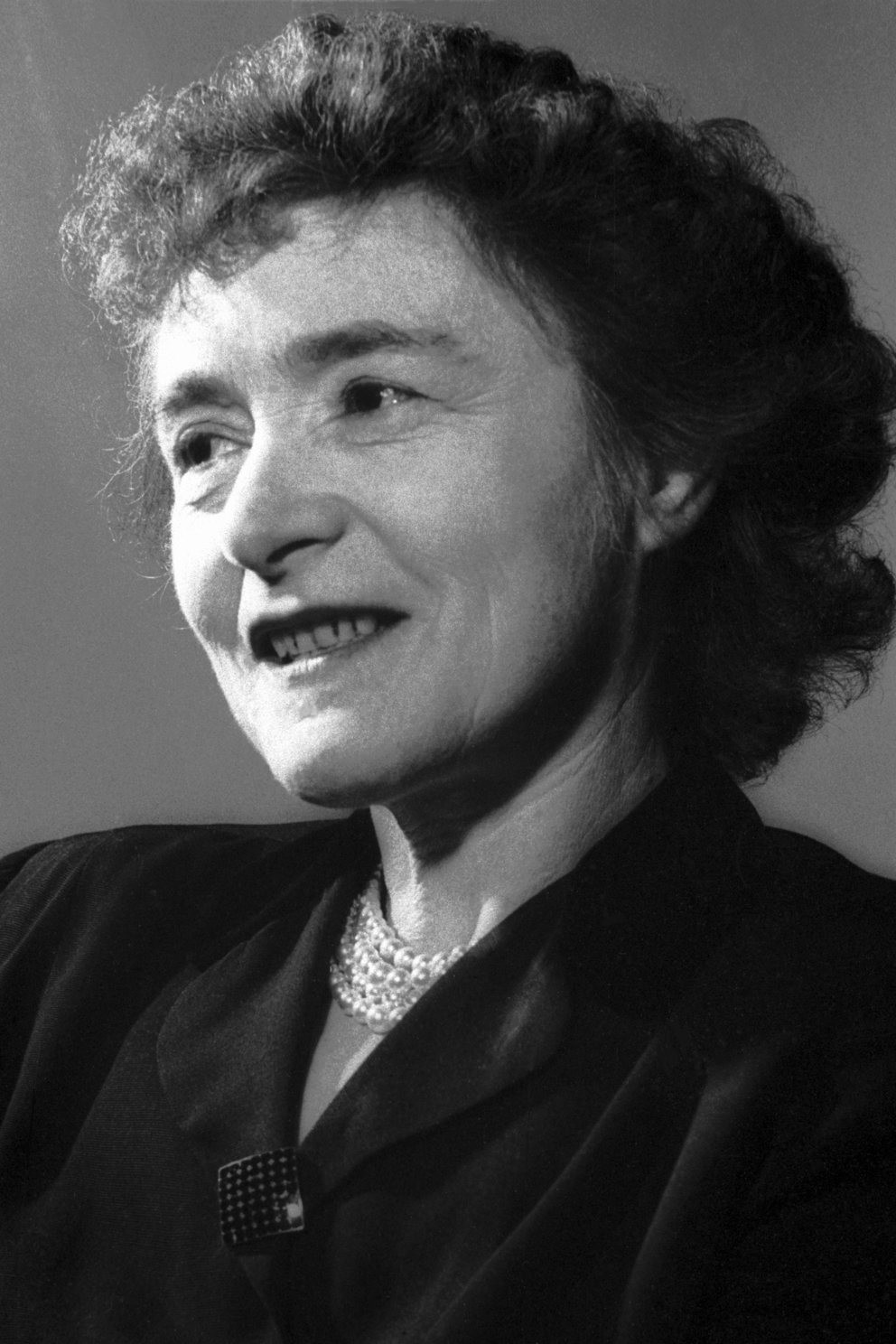
Gerty Cori

- Abraham Capadose (1795–1874) - Dutch physician and writer; friend of Isaac da Costa
- Victor von Carben (1422–1515) - German rabbi of Cologne who converted to Catholicism and later became a priest
- Carl Paul Caspari (1814–1892) - Norwegian theologian
- Paulus Stephanus Cassel (1821–1892) - German writer and preacher
- Karl Friedrich Cerf (1782–1845) - German theatrical manager in Berlin
- Daniel Chwolson (1819–1911) - Russian-Jewish orientalist; embraced Christianity later
- Leo de Benedicto Christiano - medieval financier
- Hermann Cohen (Carmelite) (1821–1871) - German Jewish pianist who became a Carmelite friar
- Ludwig Cohn (1834–1871) - German historian
- Julius Friedrich Cohnheim (1839–1884) - German pathologist
- Michael Coren (born 1959) - British-Canadian columnist, author, public speaker, radio host and television talk show host; converted to Roman Catholicism in his early twenties
- Gerty Cori (1896–1957) - Czech-American biochemist who became the third woman—and first American woman—to win a Nobel Prize in science, and the first woman to receive the Nobel Prize in Physiology or Medicine.
- Isaac da Costa (1798–1860) - Dutch language poet
- Theodor Creizenach (1818–1877) - German professor of literature
- Jehuda Cresques (1360–1410) - Catalan cartographer
- Károly Csemegi (1826–1899) - Hungarian judge who was instrumental in the creation of the first criminal code of Hungary; born Jewish and converted to Christianity
- Pablo Christiani - Spanish Dominican friar who used his position as a New Christian to try to convert other Spanish Jews to Roman Catholicism

=== D ===
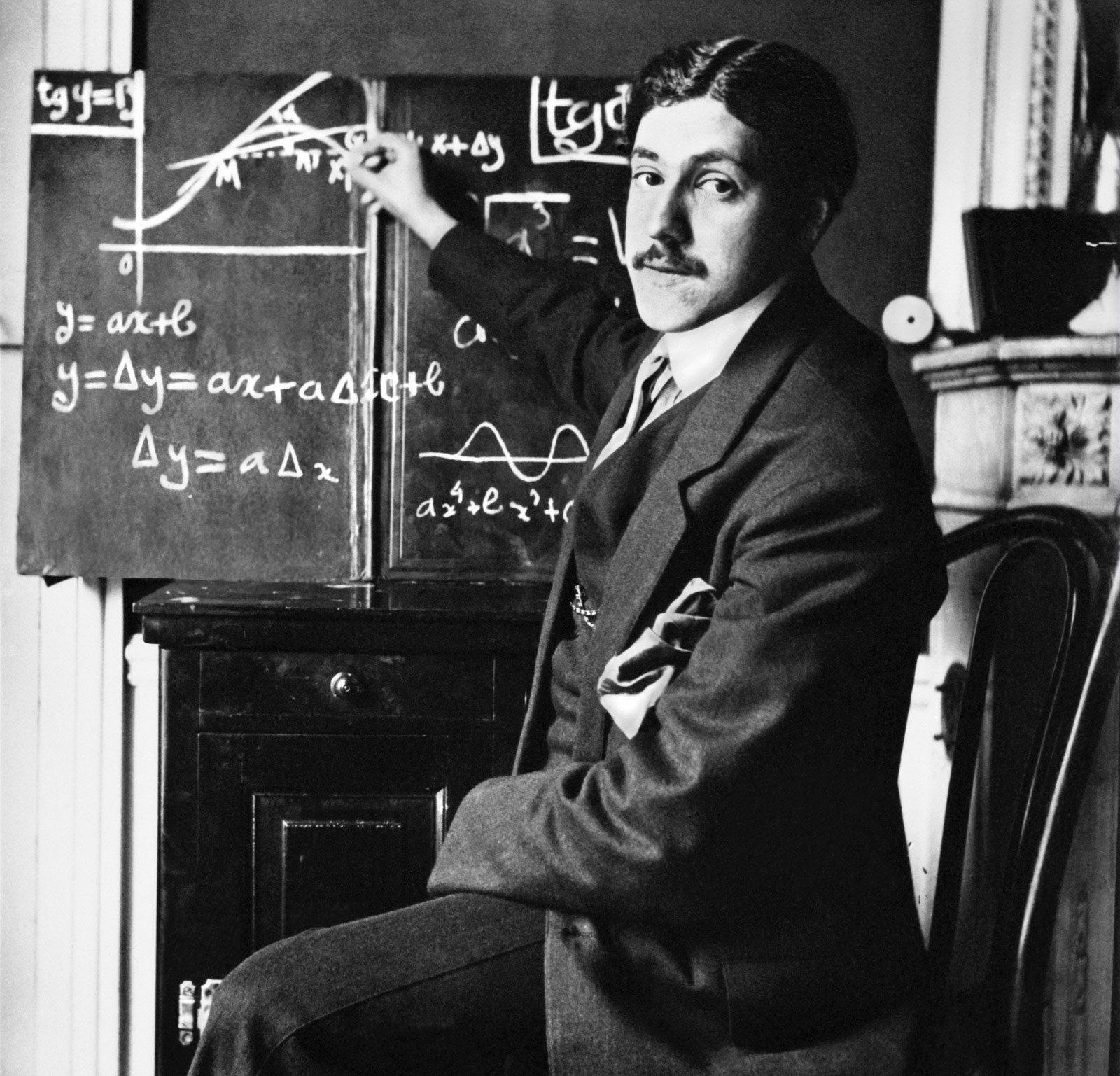
Marcel Dassault

- Ferdinand David (1810–1873) - German virtuoso violinist and composer, raised Jewish and converted to Christianity
- Marcel Dassault (1892–1986) - French aircraft industrialist; converted to Roman Catholicism in 1950
- Ludwig Dessoir (1810–1874) - German actor
- Mendel Diness (1827–1900) - Jewish watchmaker in 19th-century Jerusalem; converted to Christianity

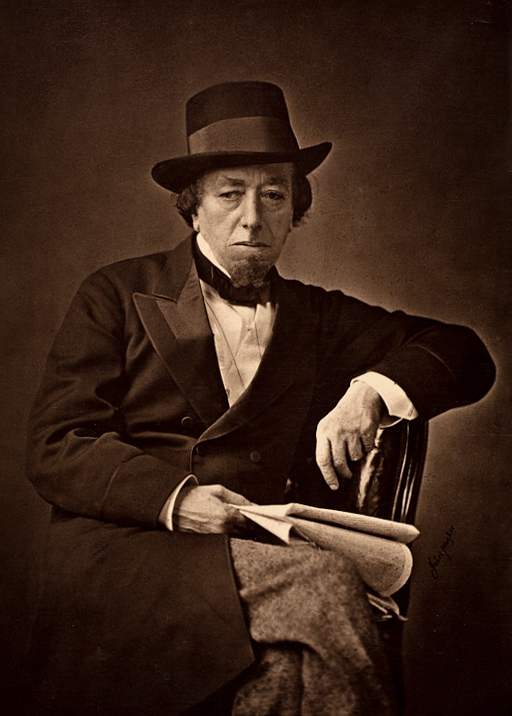
Benjamin Disraeli

- Benjamin Disraeli (1804–1881) - British prime minister and leader of the Conservative Party in the 19th century
- Leopold Ritter von Dittel (1815–1898) - Austrian surgeon
- Alfred Döblin (1878–1957) - German expressionist novelist, essayist and doctor
- David Paul Drach (1791–1865) - librarian of the Propaganda in Rome
- Bob Dylan (born 1941) - popular musician who converted to Christianity in 1979; later began studying with Chabad, a branch of Hasidic Judaism, though his current religious affiliation is uncertain
- Joy Davidman (1915–1960) - American poet and writer; her final years of life and marriage to the Christian author C. S. Lewis were partially told in the movie Shadowlands

=== E ===
- Alfred Edersheim (1825–1889) - Biblical scholar
- Peter Engel (born c. 1936) - American television producer known for teenage sitcoms on TNBC; raised Jewish and converted to Christianity
- Christian Ferdinand Ewald (1802–1874) - German divine

=== F ===
- Hans Feibusch (1898–1998) - German painter and sculptor of Jewish heritage; converted to Christianity and was baptized and confirmed into the Church of England in 1965
- Charles L. Feinberg (1909–1995) - American biblical scholar and professor of Semitics and Old Testament; converted from Judaism to Christianity in 1930 through the ministry of Chosen People Ministries
- Rachel Felix (1820–1858) - French actress
- Pero Ferrús (fl. 1380) - Castilian poet
- Arthur Flegenheimer (1901–1935) - American mobster of Jewish heritage, converted to Catholicism before his death
- Ilya Fondaminsky (1880–1942) - Jewish Russian author and political activist; adopted Christianity and was christened Russian Orthodox
- Achille Fould (1800–1867) - French financier and politician
- Wilhelm Fraknoi (1843–1924) - Hungarian bishop; president of the Hungarian Academy of Science
- Jacob Frank (1726–1791) - 18th-century Jewish reformer who claimed to be the reincarnation of Sabbatai Zevi; converted to Christianity in Poland in 1759
- Wilhelm Frankl (1893–1917) - World War I fighter ace credited with 20 aerial victories, converted to Christianity
- Giles Fraser (born 1964) - Christian minister and former canon chancellor of St Paul's Cathedral
- Emil Albert von Friedberg (1837–1910) - German professor
- Heinrich von Friedberg (1813–1895) - German jurist and statesman
- Rudolf Friedenthal (1827–1890) - German deputy
- Ludwig Friedländer (1824–1909) - German philologist who converted to Protestantism
- Julius Friedländer (1813–1884) - German numismatist; his entire family embraced Christianity in 1820
- Max Friedlander (1829–1872) - German-Austrian journalist

=== G ===
- Dennis Gabor (1900–1979) - Hungarian-British electrical engineer and physicist; winner of the 1971 Nobel Prize in Physics. In 1918, his family converted to Lutheranism, but he became an agnostic later in life.
- Eduard Gans (1798–1839) - German philosopher and jurist, exponent of the conservative Right Hegelians.
- Hermann Mayer Salomon Goldschmidt (1802–1866) - German astronomer and painter.

=== H ===
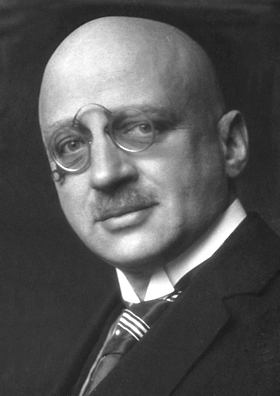
Fritz Haber

- Fritz Haber (1868–1934) - German chemist and Nobel laureate in Chemistry.
- Heinrich Heine (1799–1856) - German writer.
- Friedrich Gustav Jakob Henle (1809–1885) - German physician, pathologist and anatomist.
- August Wilhelm Henschel (1790–1856) - professor of botany at Breslau.
- Henriette Herz (1764–1803) - German author.
- Ferdinand Hiller (1811–1886) - German musical composer.
- Siegfried Hirsch (1816–1860) - professor of history, Halle.
- Theodor Hirsch (1806–1881) - professor of history, Greifswald.

=== I ===
- Abram Ioffe (1880–1960) - prominent Russian/Soviet physicist. In 1911 he converted to Lutheranism.
- Jorge Isaacs (1837–1895) - Colombian writer, politician and soldier.

=== J ===
- Carl Gustav Jacob Jacobi (1804–1857) - professor of mathematics, Berlin.
- Heinrich Jacoby (1889–1964) - German educator.
- Philipp Jaffé (1819–1870) - professor of history, Berlin.
- Georg Jellinek (1851–1911) - German legal philosopher.
- Paul S. L. Johnson (1873–1950) - American scholar and pastor.

=== K ===
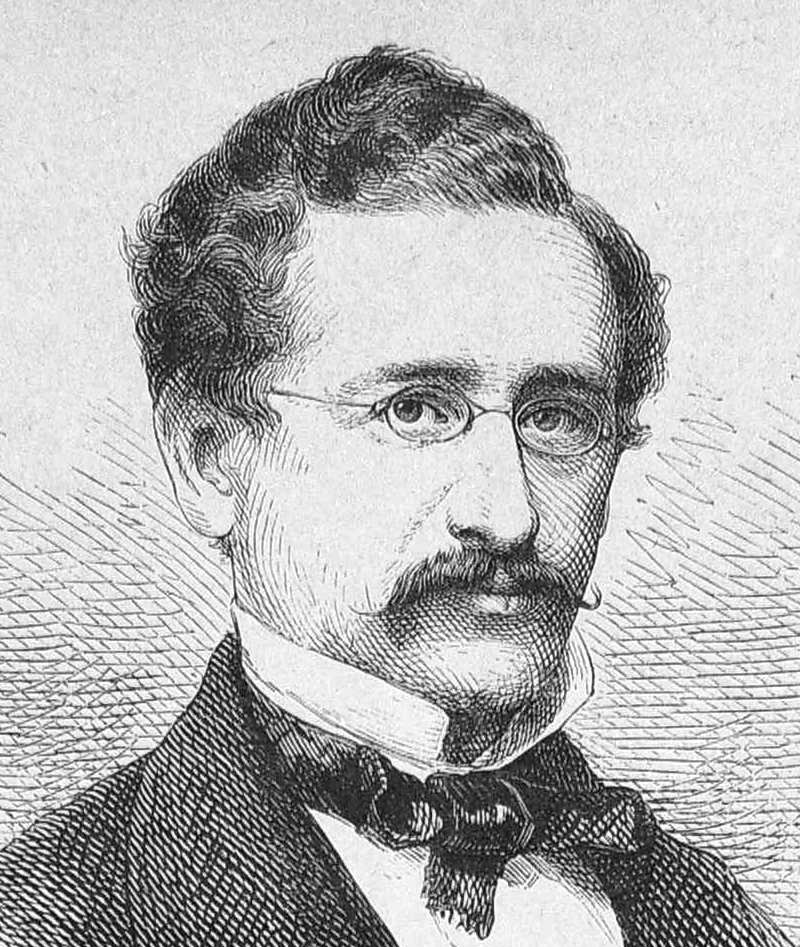
David Kalisch

- David Kalisch (1820–1872) - German playwright and humorist.
- Felix Philipp Kanitz (1829–1904) - Austro-Hungarian naturalist, geographer, ethnographer, archaeologist and author of travel notes.
- Andrew Klavan (born 1954) –-filmmaker and novelist.
- Julius Leopold Klein (1810–1876) - Hungarian-German litterateur.
- Leopold Kronecker (1823–1891) - German mathematician and logician.

=== L ===
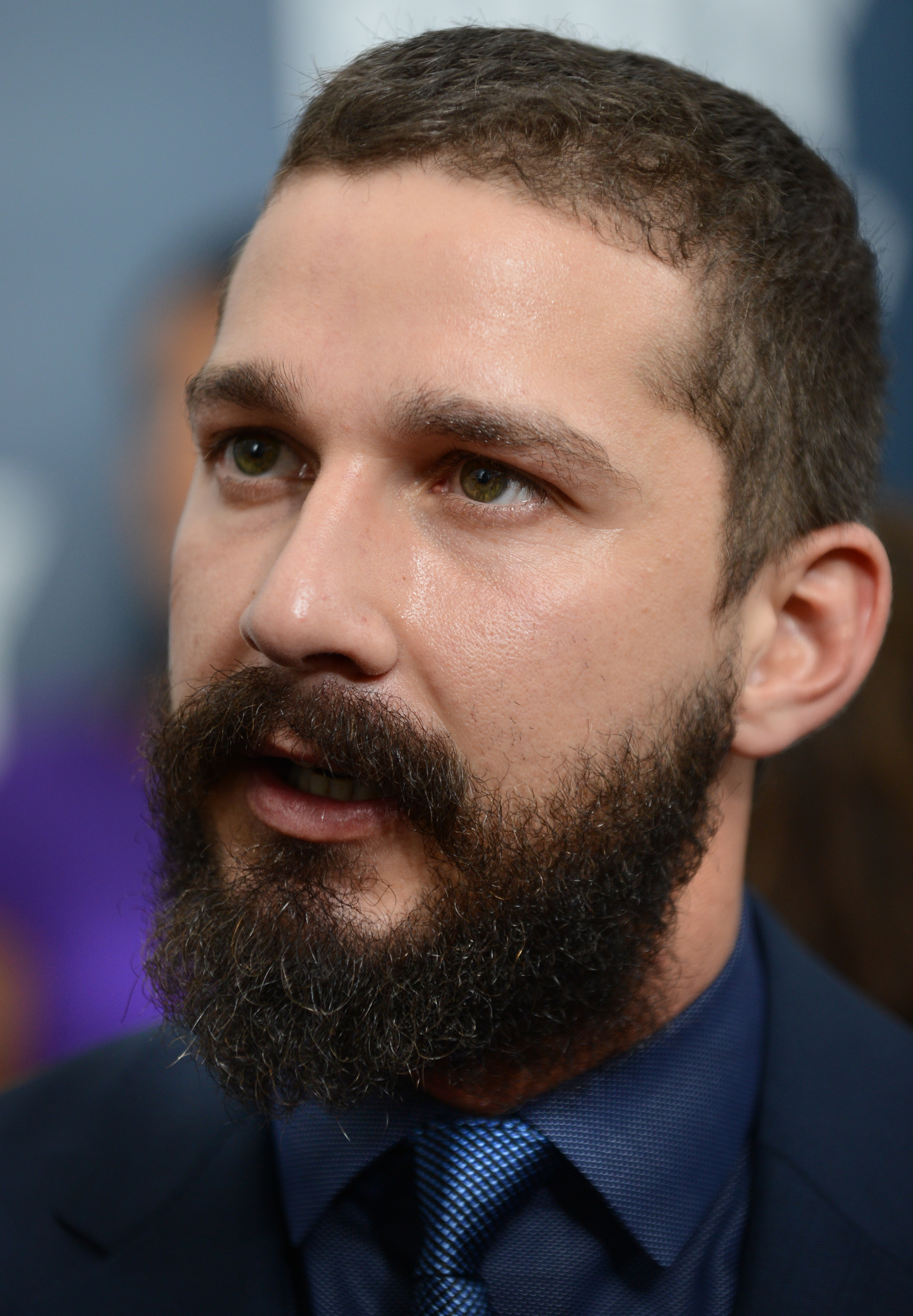
Shia LaBeouf

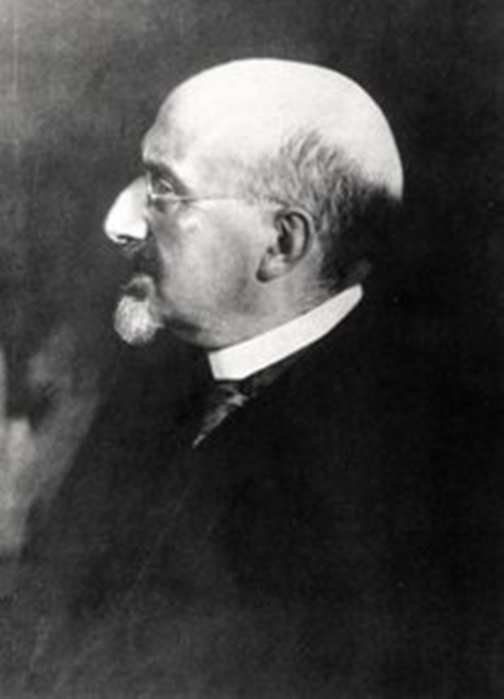
Mark Lidzbarski

- Shia LaBeouf (born 1986) - Hollywood actor who decided to leave Judaism and become a Catholic.
- Karl Landsteiner (1868–1943) - Austrian biologist and physician; winner of the Nobel Prize in Physiology or Medicine. Converted from Judaism to Roman Catholicism in 1890.
- Hermann Lebert (1813–1878) - German physician.
- Karl Lehrs (1802–1878) - German classical scholar.
- Osip Mikhailovich Lerner (1847–1907) - 19th-century Russian intellectual and lawyer.
- Daniel Lessmann (1794–1831) - 19th-century historian and poet.
- Fanny Lewald (1811–1889) - German author
- Mark Lidzbarski (1868–1928) - Polish philologist, Semitist and translator of Mandaean texts; converted to evangelical Christianity in Berlin
- Max Liebster (1915–2008) - German Jewish convert to Jehovah's Witnesses, Holocaust survivor
- Luis Ramírez de Lucena (c. 1465–c. 1530) - Spanish chess player from a family of Jews who converted to Roman Catholicism
- Jean-Marie Lustiger (1926–2007) - cardinal, former archbishop of Paris

=== M ===
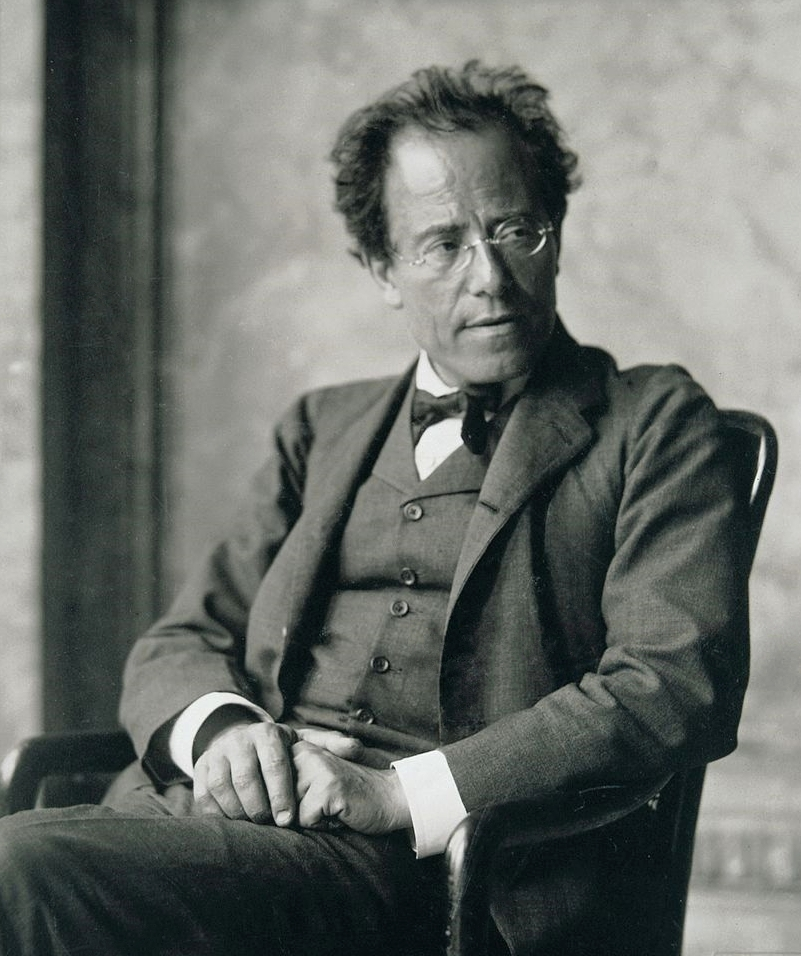
Gustav Mahler

- Eduard Magnus (1799–1872) - professor of arts, Berlin
- Heinrich Gustav Magnus (1802–1870) - German chemist and physicist
- Ludwig Immanuel Magnus (1790–1861) - German mathematician
- Gustav Mahler (1860–1911) - composer
- Moses Margoliouth (1818–1881) - Jewish historian, uncle of David Samuel Margoliouth
- Karl Marx (1818–1883) - German socialist; his family converted to Christianity before his birth
- Lise Meitner (1878–1968) - Austrian physicist who worked on radioactivity and nuclear physics; converted to Christianity, following Lutheranism, and was baptized in 1908
- Alexander Men (1935–1990) - Russian priest, Orthodox theologian and author
- Moritz Hermann Eduard Meier (1796–1855) - professor of philosophy, Halle
- Dorothea Mendelssohn (1769–1839) - German social leader, oldest daughter of Moses Mendelssohn
- Felix Mendelssohn (1809–1847) - composer, grandson of Moses Mendelssohn
- Hugh Montefiore (1920–2005) - Anglican bishop of Birmingham 1977–1987
- Robert Moses (1888–1981) - politician and "master builder" of 20th-century New York City.
- Andrea De Monte (died before 1597) - former rabbi and missionary to the Jews at Rome
- Samuel Israeli of Morocco (Samuel Marochitanus) - religious writer of 11th-century Spain and Morocco
- Marc Mero - American motivational speaker and retired professional wrestler

=== N ===
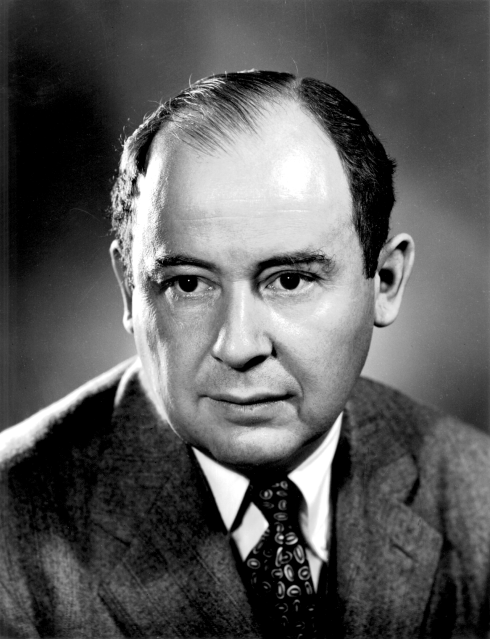
John von Neumann

- (Johann) August Wilhelm Neander, born David Mendel (1789–1850) - professor of ecclesiastical history, Berlin
- Joachim Neumann (educator) (1778/79–1865) - German educator and Hebraist
- John von Neumann (1903–1957) - Hungarian-American mathematician, physicist, inventor, computer scientist and polymath; was baptized a Catholic in 1930
- Karl Friedrich Neumann (1793–1870) - German orientalist
- Robert Novak (1931–2009) - raised in secular Jewish culture; converted to Catholicism in 1998

=== O ===
- Jacques Offenbach (1819–1880) - French German composer
- Harry Frederick Oppenheimer (1908–2000) - South African businessman

=== P ===
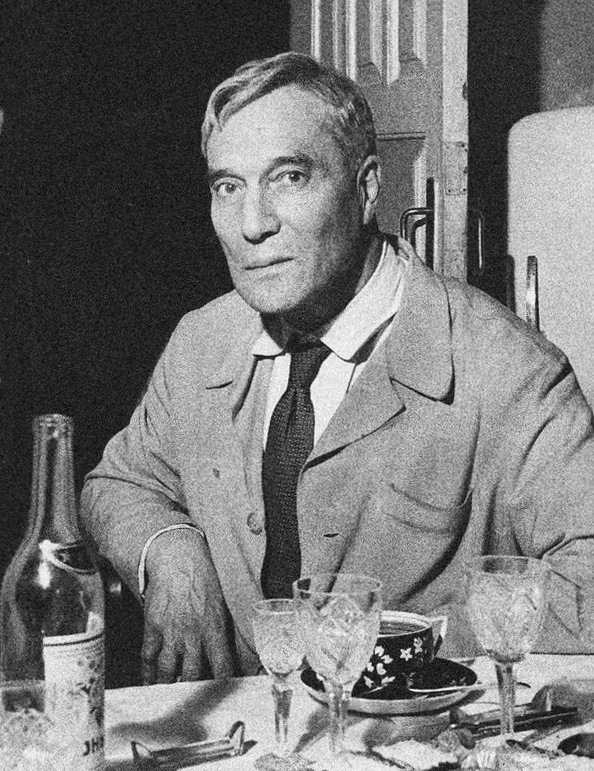
Boris Pasternak

- Francis Palgrave (1788–1861) - English historian
- Dave Pasch (born 1972) - sports announcer
- Boris Pasternak (1890–1960) - Russian poet, novelist and literary translator; awarded the Nobel Prize for Literature in 1958; converted to Eastern Orthodoxy from Judaism
- Paul the Apostle (c. 5 – c. 64/65 AD) - early Christian leader and author of many New Testament epistles
- Corey Pavin (born 1959) - PGA golfer
- Johannes Pfefferkorn (1469–1523) - German theologian and writer
- Friedrich Adolf Philippi (1809–1882) - German Lutheran theologian
- Lorenzo Da Ponte (1749–1839) - Italian librettist
- Henry Poper (1813–1870) - German-born Anglican clergyman and missionary

=== R ===
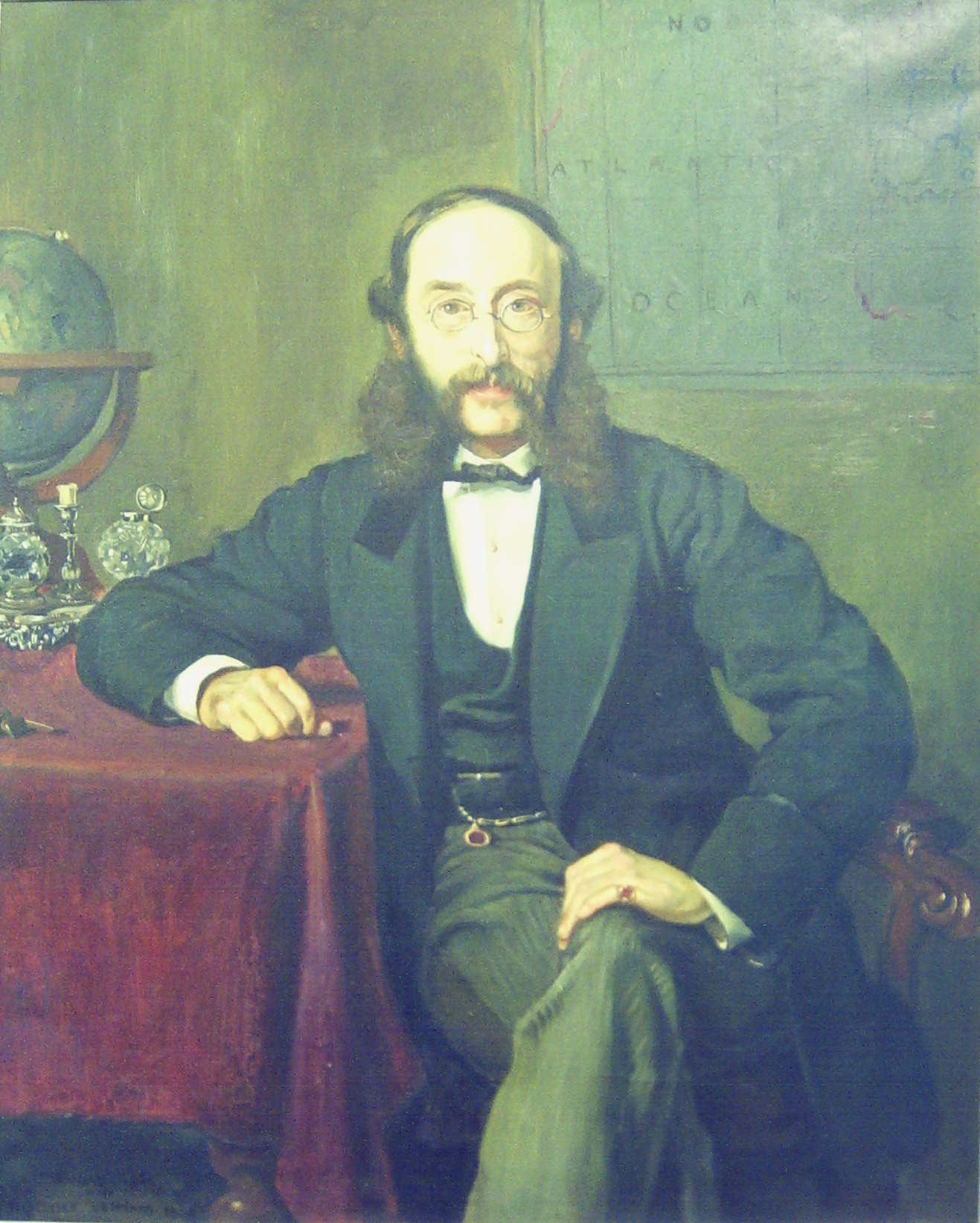
Paul Reuter

- Marie-Alphonse Ratisbonne (1814–1884) - French Jew who converted to Christianity in 1842 after seeing an apparition of the Virgin Mary; later became a priest and founded the Convent of Ecce Homo and the Ratisbonne Monastery
- Harry Reems (1947–2013) - adult film actor
- Paul Reuter (1816–1899) - German entrepreneur and founder of Reuters News Agency; converted to Christianity at St. George's German Lutheran Chapel in London in 1845
- David Ricardo (1772–1823) - English political economist
- Giovanni Battista Eliano (died 1580) - Italian Jesuit priest and scholar of Oriental languages
- Gillian Rose (1947–1995) - British philosopher and sociologist
- Johann Georg Rosenhain (1816–1887) - German professor of mathematics
- Moishe Rosen (1932–2010) - founder of Jews for Jesus
- Sid Roth (born 1940) - American televangelist
- Anton Rubinstein (1829–1889) - Russian musician

=== S ===
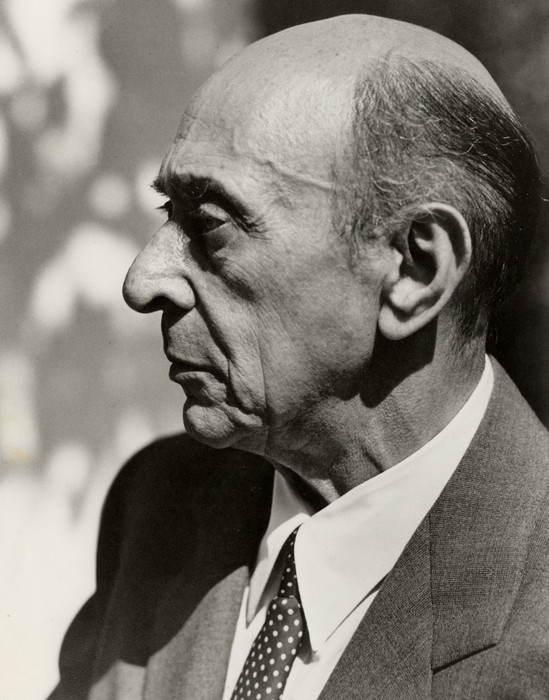
Arnold Schoenberg

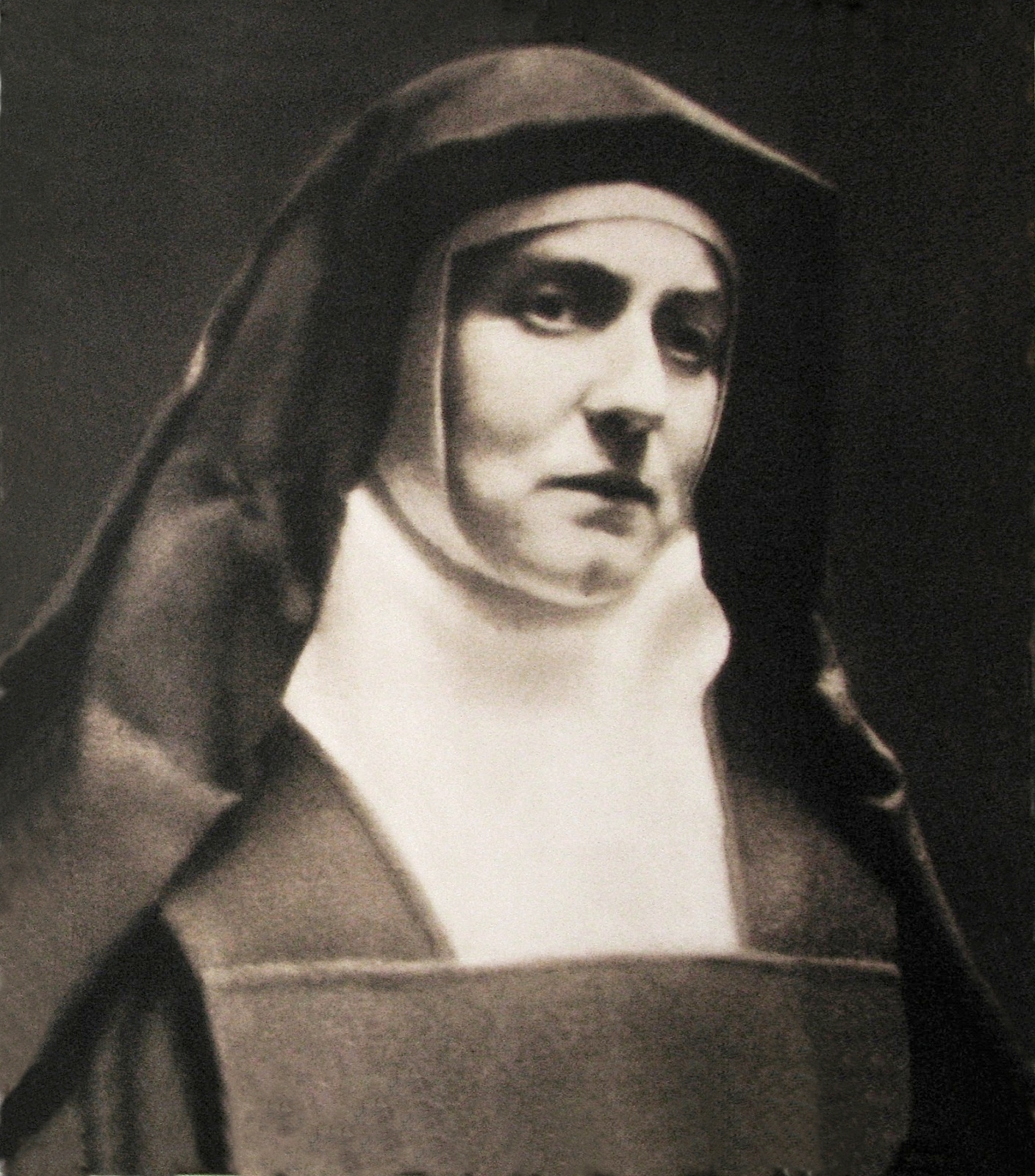
Edith Stein

- Joseph d'Aguilar Samuda (1813–1885) - English shipbuilder and member of Parliament
- Adolph Saphir (1831–1891) - Hungarian-born missionary and Presbyterian minister
- Sarah-Theodora - wife of Tsar Ivan Alexander of Bulgaria.
- Samuel Isaac Joseph Schereschewsky (1831–1906) - Episcopal bishop of Shanghai, founder of St. John's University, Shanghai, Bible translator
- Arnold Schoenberg (1874–1951) - composer who converted to Christianity in 1898 but returned to Judaism in 1933
- Moses Wilhelm Shapira (1830–1884) - Jerusalem antiquities dealer known for allegedly forged Deuteronomic scroll fragments
- Eduard von Simson (1810–1899) - German jurist and politician
- Otto Spiegelberg (1830–1881) - German professor of medicine, Breslau
- Dan Spitz (born 1963) - lead guitarist of the heavy metal band Anthrax
- Friedrich Julius Stahl (1802–1861) - Prussian jurist and conservative thinker
- Aurel Stein (1862–1943) - Hungarian-British orientalist, archaeologist and historian
- Edith Stein (1891–1942) - nun, martyr and saint
- Bethel Henry Strousberg (1823–1884) - German financier
- David Suchet (born 1946) - British actor who converted to the Church of England in 1986 after reading Romans 8 in a hotel room Bible
- Irena Szewińska (1946–2018) - Polish athlete

=== T ===
- Siegbert Tarrasch (1862–1934) - challenger for the World Chess Championship

=== V ===
- Mordechai Vanunu (born 1952) - whistle-blower on Israel's nuclear program who was subsequently kidnapped, tried and imprisoned by Israel
- Rahel Varnhagen (1771–1833) - German writer and saloniste

=== W ===
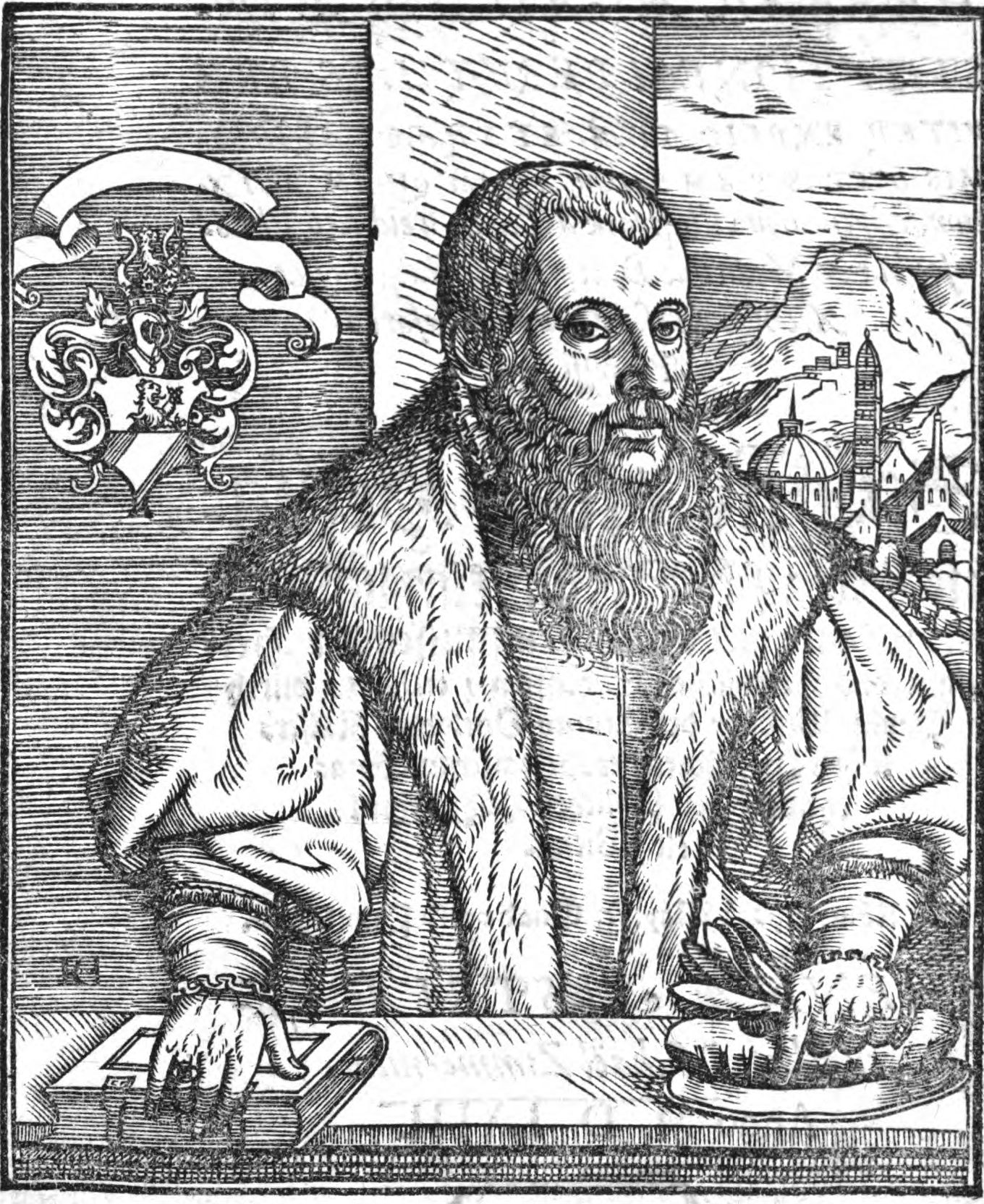
Paul Weidner

- Paul Weidner (1525–1585) - Austrian medical doctor and later professor of Hebrew at the University of Vienna.
- Otto Weininger (1880–1903) - Austrian philosopher
- Eugene Wigner (1902–1995) - Hungarian-American theoretical physicist and mathematician; received half of the 1963 Nobel Prize in Physics; although his family converted to Lutheranism for political reasons, he was an atheist
- Joseph Wolff (1795–1862) - German missionary

=== X ===
- Morris Ximenes (1762–1837) - 18th-century English merchant

=== Y ===
- David Levy Yulee (1810–1886) - United States senator from Florida

=== Z ===
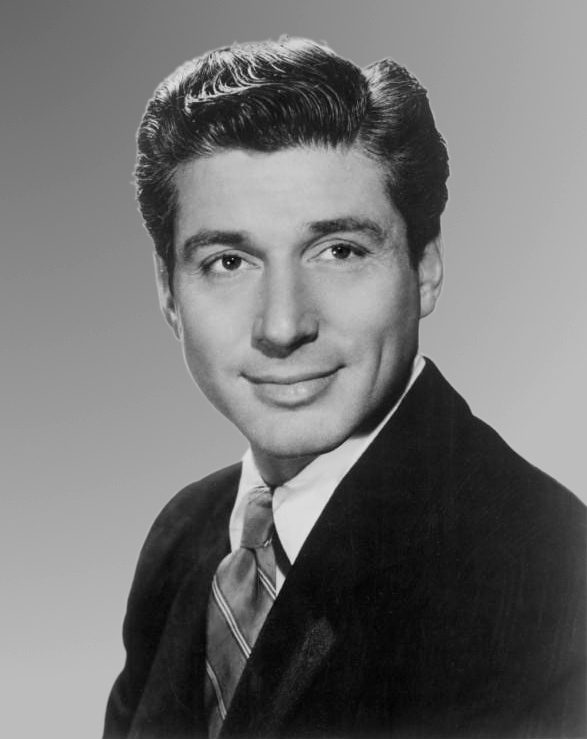
Efrem Zimbalist Jr.

- Efrem Zimbalist Jr. (1918–2014) - American actor
- Israel Zolli (1881–1956) - former chief rabbi of Rome
- Vitaly Zdorovetskiy - Russian-American YouTuber, prankster and social media influencer

== Manichaeism ==
- St. Augustine of Hippo - early Christian theologian and philosopher

== Rastafari ==
- Bob Marley - Jamaican reggae singer and musician

== Zoroastrianism ==
- Mar Abba I - Metropolitan bishop and saint of the Assyrian Church of the East
- Anastasius of Persia - originally a Zoroastrian soldier in the Sasanian army, later converted to Christianity
- Babowai - Catholicos of Seleucia-Ctesiphon and patriarch of the Church of the East from 457 to 484, during the reign of the Sassanid King Peroz I
- Bademus - rich, noble citizen from Persia, founded a monastery nearby
- Behnam, Sarah, and the Forty Martyrs - 4th-century Christians who suffered martyrdom during the reign of Shapur II
- Christina of Persia - Sasanian Persian noblewoman and Christian martyr
- Nadir Dinshaw - British Parsi philanthropist, businessman and accountant; converted from Zoroastrianism to Christianity in the early 1960s
- Shapurji Edalji - probably the first person from South Asia to be made the vicar of an English parish
- Eustathius of Mtskheta - Orthodox Christian saint, executed for his apostasy from Zoroastrianism by the Sasanian military authorities in Caucasian Iberia
- George of Izla - East Syriac martyr, theologian and interpreter
- Golinduch - noble Persian woman; converted from Zoroastrianism to Christianity in the reign of Khosrau I
- Gregory the Commander - Sasanian military leader from the House of Mihran, who converted from Zoroastrianism to Christianity
- Varaz Grigor - Mihranid king of Caucasian Albania from 628 until his death in 638
- Daisy Irani - Indian actress in Hindi and Telugu language films
- Ishoʿsabran - Persian Zoroastrian convert to Christianity who was martyred in the Sasanian Empire in 620 or 621
- Javanshir - prince of Caucasian Albania 637–680, hailing from the region of Gardman
- Joseph Hazzaya - 8th-century Syriac Christian writer, ascetic and mystic
- Miles - bishop of Susa in Sasanian Persia from before 315 until his martyrdom in 340 or 341
- Mirian III of Iberia - king of Iberia or Kartli
- Niketas the Persian - 7th-century Byzantine officer
- Peroz - king of Gogarene and Gardman 330–361; converted to Christianity during his rule in Caucasus
- Piran Gushnasp - appointed as the new governor (marzban) of Iberia; between 540 and 542 he converted to Christianity
- Razhden the Protomartyr - 5th-century Persian nobleman in the service of the Georgian king Vakhtang I of Iberia and a convert to Christianity who was executed by the Sassanid military in Iberia
- Sagdukht - 5th-century queen consort of Iberia
- Salome of Armenia - Armenian princess
- Sinharib - Assyrian king who controlled Nineveh in the fourth century AD
- Sultana Mahdokht - daughter of Pholar, the prince of Dorsas
- Theophobos - Iranian commander of the Khurramites who converted to Christianity
- Tiridates III of Armenia - proclaimed Christianity as the state religion of Armenia in 301, making the Armenian kingdom the first state to embrace Christianity officially
- Yazdin - influential Iranian aristocrat

== Yezidism ==
- Zarifa Pashaevna Mgoyan - Russian pop singer, model and actress; converted to Eastern Orthodoxy after marriage

== Satanism ==
- Bartolo Longo - Italian lawyer and former Satanic priest, beatified by Pope John Paul II in 1980
- Jason Massey - American murderer
- Sean Sellers - American murderer

== Sikhism ==
- Jasvinder Sanghera - British activist against forced marriages
- Bakht Singh - Indian Christian evangelist
- Gurmit Singh - Singaporean actor known for his role in Phua Chu Kang as the title character
- Sadhu Sundar Singh - Indian Christian missionary and Sadhu

== Skepticism ==
- Chip Ingram - American author and pastor of Venture Christian Church in Los Gatos, California

== Undetermined ==
- Kim Dae-jung - president of South Korea 1998–2003, and the 2000 Nobel Peace Prize recipient
- Tony Fontane - popular recording artist in the 1940s and 1950s
- Wernher von Braun (1912–1977) - German aerospace engineer and space architect considered a "father of rocket science". Von Braun's religious conversion occurred in 1946 after he visited a church in Texas.
- René Girard (1923–2015) - philosophical anthropologist
- William Onyeabor - Nigerian funk musician
- Barbara Jones - Jamaican singer who became a Christian, gave up her secular career, and released four gospel albums
- Gloria Gaynor - American singer, best known for her disco era hits, notably "I Will Survive". After what she referred to as a sinful lifestyle, and a search in different faiths, she became a Christian and rejected several things from her former musical career.
- Tony Orlando - American producer who reached fame as the lead singer of the group Tony Orlando and Dawn in the early 1970s. Interviewed on The 700 Club, he explained that he became a Christian in 1978, after life struggles.
- Lou Gramm - lead singer of 1980s band Foreigner; in 1992, after having completed a stint in a rehab center, became a born again Christian; after surviving a brain tumour, he released a Christian rock album, The Lou Gram Band (2009)
- Nicko McBrain - drummer of heavy metal band Iron Maiden
- Jin Au-Yeung - Chinese-American hip hop rapper, songwriter and actor; became a born-again Christian in 2008
- Spencer Chamberlain - lead vocalist of the Christian metalcore band Underoath, was not raised in a religious home
- Dave Mustaine - former lead guitarist of Metallica and co-founder and lead guitarist of Megadeth; though raised as a Jehovah's Witness, he left religion early in his youth and later practiced satanism and occult practices; in 2002 he became a born-again Christian
- Kunle Ajayi - Nigerian saxophonist and veteran of gospel music in his country; became a Christian in high school; later became a pastor
- Abraham Laboriel - prominent Mexican bassist who has participated in over 5,000 studio albums along with international musicians; became a Christian and recorded several gospel albums; continues to play with Christian and secular musicians
- G.E.M. - Hong Kong singer who was baptized and became a Christian in 2011
- Vanity - former front woman of Vanity 6 who after becoming a Christian renounced her stage name and music and started to preach in different parts of the U.S.

== See also ==
- Conversion to Christianity
- List of people by belief

== Notes and references ==
=== Works cited ===
- Howard-Johnston, James (2010). "Ḵosrow II". Encyclopaedia Iranica, Online Edition.
- Morony, Michael G. (2005) [1984]. Iraq After The Muslim Conquest. Gorgias Press LLC. ISBN 978-1-59333-315-7.
- Rapp, S.H. Jr. (2003). Studies in Medieval Georgian Historiography: Early Texts and Eurasian Contexts. Corpus Scriptorum Christianorum Orientalium. Vol. 113. Peeters. ISBN 978-90-429-1318-9.
- Rassam, Suha (2005). Christianity in Iraq: Its Origins and Development to the Present Day. Gracewing Publishing.
- Venetis, Evangelos (2005). "Ḵorramis in Byzantium". In Yarshater, Ehsan (ed.). Encyclopædia Iranica (Online ed.). Encyclopædia Iranica Foundation.
- Wardrop, Margery; Wardrop, J.O. (2006). "Life of St. Nino". In Margery Wardrop; Kirsopp Lake; G.H. Gwilliam; C.F. Rogers (eds.). Studies in Biblical and Patristic Criticism: Or Studia Biblica Et Ecclesiastica. Vol. 5. Gorgias Press. ISBN 1-59333-470-2.
- Wigram, William Ainger (1910). An Introduction to the History of the Assyrian Church or The Church of the Sassanid Persian Empire 100-640 A.D. London: Society for Promoting Christian Knowledge.
- Wood, Philip (2013). The Chronicle of Seert: Christian Historical Imagination in Late Antique Iraq. Oxford University Press.
