= Hamid Pourmand =

- Born: 1958 (age 67–68)
- Occupations: former army colonel in the Iranian army, lay leader of the Jama'at-e Rabbani
- Spouse: Arlet
- Children: 2 sons

Hamid Pourmand (Persian: حميد پورمند; born 1958) is a former army colonel in the Iranian army and a lay leader of the Jama'at-e Rabbani, the Iranian branch of the Assemblies of God church in Bandar Bushehr, a southern port city in Iran.

== Personal background ==
Hamid Pourmand is married to Arlet, who is an Assyrian Christian. They have two sons, named Immanuel and David. Under the laws of the Islamic Republic of Iran, it is illegal for a non-Muslim to serve as a military officer. In spite of this, Hamid Pourmand continued to serve as an officer in the Iranian army. According to his family and Christian acquaintances, Hamid Pourmand was quite open about his Christian faith and never attempted to conceal his religious conversion.

Pourmand frequently served as the volunteer pastor of a congregation of the Assemblies of God Church in Bushehr. The Iranian Assemblies of God Church is a Pentecostal Protestant group belonging to the Assemblies of God, derived from the Assemblies of God USA.

At the time of his 2004 arrest, his wife and children were visiting relatives in Tehran. Upon returning to Bushehr, they discovered that their house had been broken into and vandalized. Personal items, such as family papers, documents and photographs had been removed from the family home.

== Arrest ==
Pourmand was arrested on September 9, 2004, along with up to 85 other church leaders at the annual general conference of Jama'at-e Rabbani, in Karaj, 18 miles (29 km) west of the capital city, Tehran. Every single person present was put under arrest, blindfolded and taken for interrogation. Each individual was questioned separately by security officials, who had a list of specific questions. The interrogation revealed that the authorities had very precise information about each person, including his or her activities and other personal data.

By the evening, the authorities had released all the arrested Evangelicals except for Pourmand and nine other pastors and elders among them. All of the released evangelicals were forbidden to attend church services.

On September 12, 2004, the nine pastors and elders were released quite late in the night. The pastors were not given any specific reason for their arrest, although they were asked many questions about themselves and each other. According to Middle East Concern and Compass Direct, Pourmand, remained in incommunicado detention in the first five months after his arrest.

A few days before Pourmand and his fellow evangelicals were arrested, a top official within the Ministry of Security Intelligence spoke on state television's Channel 1, warning the populace against the many "foreign religions" active in the country and pledging to protect the nation's "beloved Shiite Islam" from all outside forces.

Reportedly, this same official participated in the prolonged interrogation of the 10 evangelical pastors, complaining that Protestant activities in Iran had gone out of control and insisting that their church do something to stop the flood of Evangelical literature, television and radio programs targeting Iran.

== Conviction ==
On February 16, 2006, Pourmand was convicted before a Tehran military court of deceiving the Iranian armed forces about his conversion in 1980 as well as "acts against national security". Pourmand allegedly failed to declare that he was a convert from Islam to Christianity when he acquired officer rank. It has been reported that he decided not to appeal against his conviction on the grounds that he would have served his sentence before a final decision could be reached.

According to the Center for Religious Freedom, Pourmand's lawyer reportedly produced evidence that Pourmand's military superiors recognized several years ago that he was a Christian and had given him exemptions from participating in Muslim fasts during Ramadan, an exemption granted only to non-Muslims. However, that the evidence was rejected as false and Pourmand was sentenced to three years in prison with the loss of all benefits.

The Military Court ruled that Hamid Pourmand was guilty of giving false testimony and producing falsified documents. The verdict on 16 February came during the second and final session of his military trial which had begun in late January. Hamid Pourmand's conviction automatically discharges him from the Iranian army. The verdict also required his family to vacate their home in military lodgings.

The center had called for Pourmand's immediate release from prison shortly after the court's decision. However, that call went unanswered,

The UK-based Christian Solidarity Worldwide (CSW), reported that the subsequent loss of his regular income, 20-year army pension and home resulted in the destitution of his wife and two children who at the time, had no source of income.

Pourmand is currently incarcerated at the Evin maximum security Prison in Tehran. According to the center, human rights groups have reported on the prison's deplorable conditions and use of torture there.

== Additional charges of apostasy and acquittion ==
After being convicted in the military court, further charges of apostasy and proselytizing were brought against Pourmand. Under the Islamic Sharia law, if convicted he would have received the death penalty.

During the initial nine months of imprisonment, Pourmand was subjected to repeated pressures to recant his Christian faith and return to Islam in order to escape execution for apostasy, as required under the theocratic Islamic Sharia law of Iran.

Pourmand is the first Iranian convert to be charged with apostasy since 1993 when Iranian Pastor Mehdi Dibaj was sentenced to death. Although Dibaj was released three weeks later following protests from the international community initiated by his close friend and colleague Bishop Haik Hovsepian Mehr, he was murdered six months later. Dibaj's murder was soon followed by the abduction and murder of Haik Hovsepian Mehr three days later. Like Pourmand, both Dibaj and Mehr were members of the Jama'at-e Rabbani Church.

The last execution to have taken place for apostasy in Iran was on December 3, 1989, when the evangelist and pastor of the Jama'at-e Rabbani Church in Mashad, Rev. Hossein Soodmand was hanged until death.

On May 28, 2005, a court in Bushehr acquitted Hamid Pourmand on further charges of apostasy and proselytizing, declaring that "under Sharia law, there are no charges against you." During the hearing, the judge reportedly told him, "I don't know who you are, but apparently the rest of the world does. You must be an important person, because many people from government have called me, saying to cancel your case."

The international human rights watch group Amnesty International believed Hamid Pourmand to be a prisoner of conscience, imprisoned solely on account of his religion, stemming from legal discrimination against Christians in Iran. However, Iran's judiciary stated on May 2, 2005, that Pourmand was in jail for breaking the law and not because of his religion.

Judiciary spokesman Jamal Karimi-Rad claimed that Pourmand had been "involved in a political group" while serving in the armed forces, which is forbidden by Iranian law. The spokesman also stated that Hamid Pourmand "appealed the three-year sentence, but the appeal court upheld the lower court's conviction."

During the court hearings in February, court officials reportedly declared that for many years Pourmand had belonged to "an underground church through which many Muslims had deserted Islam and became Christians".

== See also ==
- Christianity in Iran
- List of converts to Christianity
- List of former Muslims
