= Henry Poper =

German Church of England clergyman and missionary to Jews

The Reverend Henry Poper

Orders
- Ordination: 1842

Personal details
- Born: 11 April 1813 Breitenbach, Hesse
- Died: 22 April 1870 (aged 57) Frankfurt, Hesse-Nassau
- Denomination: Anglican

Henry Poper (1813–1870) was a German-born Jewish convert to Christianity, a clergyman of the Church of England, and a missionary to Jews.

== Early life ==
Heinrich "Henry" Poper was born on 11 April 1813 of Jewish parentage at Breitenbach, in Electoral Hesse, Germany. At Hildesheim, the native place of his mother, he received his early education at the famous school which flourished under the superintendence of the Jewish rabbi Wolfsohn. He also received private instruction to prepare himself for the office of a teacher. About the age of eighteen (May 1831), Poper received an appointment as Jewish teacher and reader in the synagogue, having also occasionally to lecture in the synagogue.

== Conversion ==
During the period of eight years he filled this office in two places in the Kingdom of Hanover. Through reading the New Testament and discussions with Christians, he decided to convert to Christianity. On 15 July 1839, he received Christian baptism. When, the following year, the London Society for Propagating Christianity Among the Jews opened the Hebrew College for the purpose of training missionaries to Jews, Poper was enrolled as one of the first students.

== Ministry ==
In June 1842, Poper was appointed by the committee as a missionary to Frankfort-on-the-Main, and was subsequently ordained to the ministry of the Church of England. By 1850, he was in charge of the Frankfort-on-the-Main mission, and had obtained a doctorate. Poper's mission was successful, according to his very voluminous reports. His own baptisms, from 1843 to 1870, amounted to eighty-eight, and he gave it as his opinion that there were not many Jewish families in Europe of which one or two members had not become Christians. He sold 7,647 German Bibles during the last ten years of his life. He died on 22 April 1870, at the comparatively early age of fifty-seven years, of which twenty-eight had been spent in the Society's service.

== Reputation ==
Poper was a very active missionary, and was highly esteemed for his zeal and efforts both among Jews and Christians. When, on 25 April 1870, his remains were carried to their resting-place, all the Protestant pastors of the city, accompanied by many Hebrew-Christians and Jews, followed to the grave. A rabbi of a reformed synagogue, when informed by a missionary of Poper's death, said, "Mr. Poper was a very good man. I have known him well. He was greatly respected among my friends, who were also his friends. I liked him very much, although he was a convert to Christianity."

== See also ==
- Hebrew Christian movement
- History of Jewish conversion to Christianity

== Sources ==
- Darby, Michael R. (2010). "The Hebrew Christian Movement During the "Palmy Days" of the London Society for Promoting Christianity Amongst the Jews". The Emergence of the Hebrew Christian Movement in Nineteenth-Century Britain. Numen Book Series, Vol. 128. Brill. p. 99.

Attribution:
