= Ghorban Tourani =

Iranian Christian martyr

Ghorban Tourani

Ghorban Dordi Tourani (1952 – 22 November 2005), also called Ghorban Tori (قربان دردى تورانى in Persian), was an Iranian convert to Christianity and a lay minister. He lived and worked in Gonbad Kavous, Golestan, Iran.

Tourani, an Iranian Turkmen, was brought up as Sunni Muslim, but converted to the Christian faith in the mid-1990s during a stay in Turkmenistan. After his return to Iran he rapidly established a Christian ministry and a house church amongst his compatriots in his predominantly Islamic home town.

Following multiple threats of death he was abducted and murdered on 22 November 2005.

His murder followed the even more widely publicised arrest and trial of the Iranian Christian convert and lay minister Hamid Pourmand for apostasy by the Iranian authorities. His death, the first murder of a pastor after several years, was a major point of escalation in the renewed persecution of Christian converts from Islam in Iran and the small but growing house church movement.
