= Coiner =

Coiner is a surname. Notable people with the surname include:

- Charles Coiner (born 1943), former Idaho state senator
- Charles T. Coiner (1898–1989), American painter and advertising art director
- Charlie Coiner (born 1960), American college football coach
- Ryan Coiner (born 1979), American retired soccer forward

== See also ==
- Camp Coiner, a United States Forces Korea installation in Seoul, South Korea
- Coining (disambiguation)
