= Joachim Neumann (educator) =

German educator and Hebraist, and a Jewish convert to Christianity

Joachim Neumann (1778/79–1865) was a noted German educator and Hebraist, and a convert to Christianity from Judaism.

== Early life ==
Joachim Neumann was born at Brody, in Austrian Poland, in the year 1778 or 1779, of Jewish parentage. Up to his thirteenth year he received his education in the house of his father, which he then left for Posen, where he was enabled to satisfy his thirst for knowledge.

== Teaching ==
Towards the end of the 18th century he obtained an appointment as teacher in a celebrated Jewish school at Dessau, where he remained until the year 1807. During his residence there he took part with three other learned Jews in publishing a German translation of the Twelve Minor Prophets, which was accompanied by a Hebrew commentary. At that time a great change had taken place among the Jews living in different parts of Prussia with regard to their social position. About the year 1790 the King of Prussia granted the Jews who had obtained permission to live in Breslau an exemption from the taxes which had formerly been imposed on them when obtaining such permission, on the condition that they should establish a school for the poor children of their community. This led to the founding of William School in 1791, and in 1807 Neumann was invited to become the head master and inspector of that school. For about nineteen years he had charge of that institution, i.e., from 1807 to 1826.

== Conversion ==
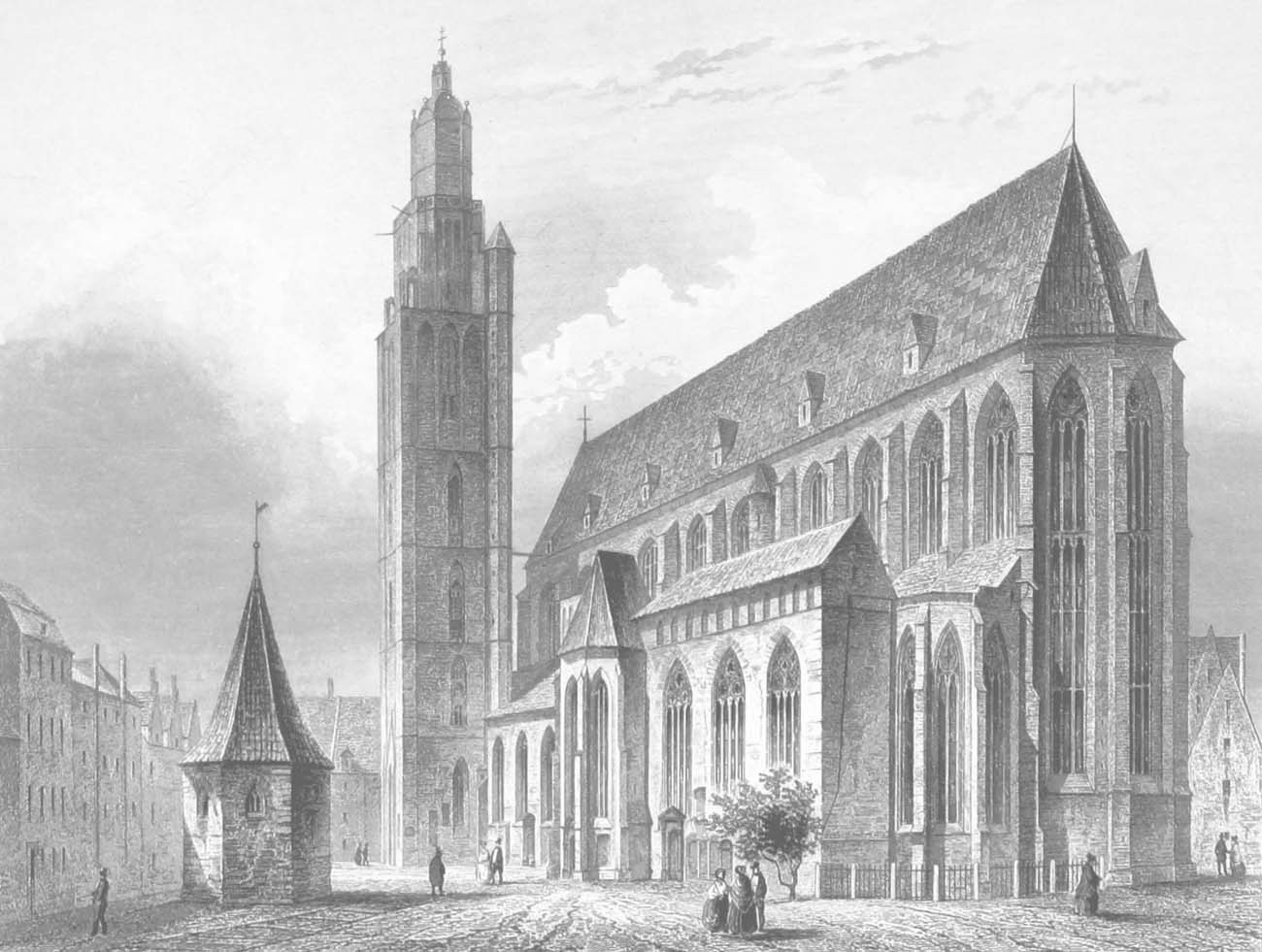
View of St Elizabeth's Church, Breslau from the south-east side

During his connection with this school Neumann had been on terms of the most intimate friendship with Professors Steffens and Scheibel, who were the means of converting him to Christianity. Convinced of the truth of Christianity, he was baptised on 16 April 1826, together with his wife and three sons, in the local parish church, St Elizabeth's, Breslau, by Professor Scheibel, having as one of the sponsors Professor Braniss, of the University of Breslau, his brother-in-law.

== Later life ==
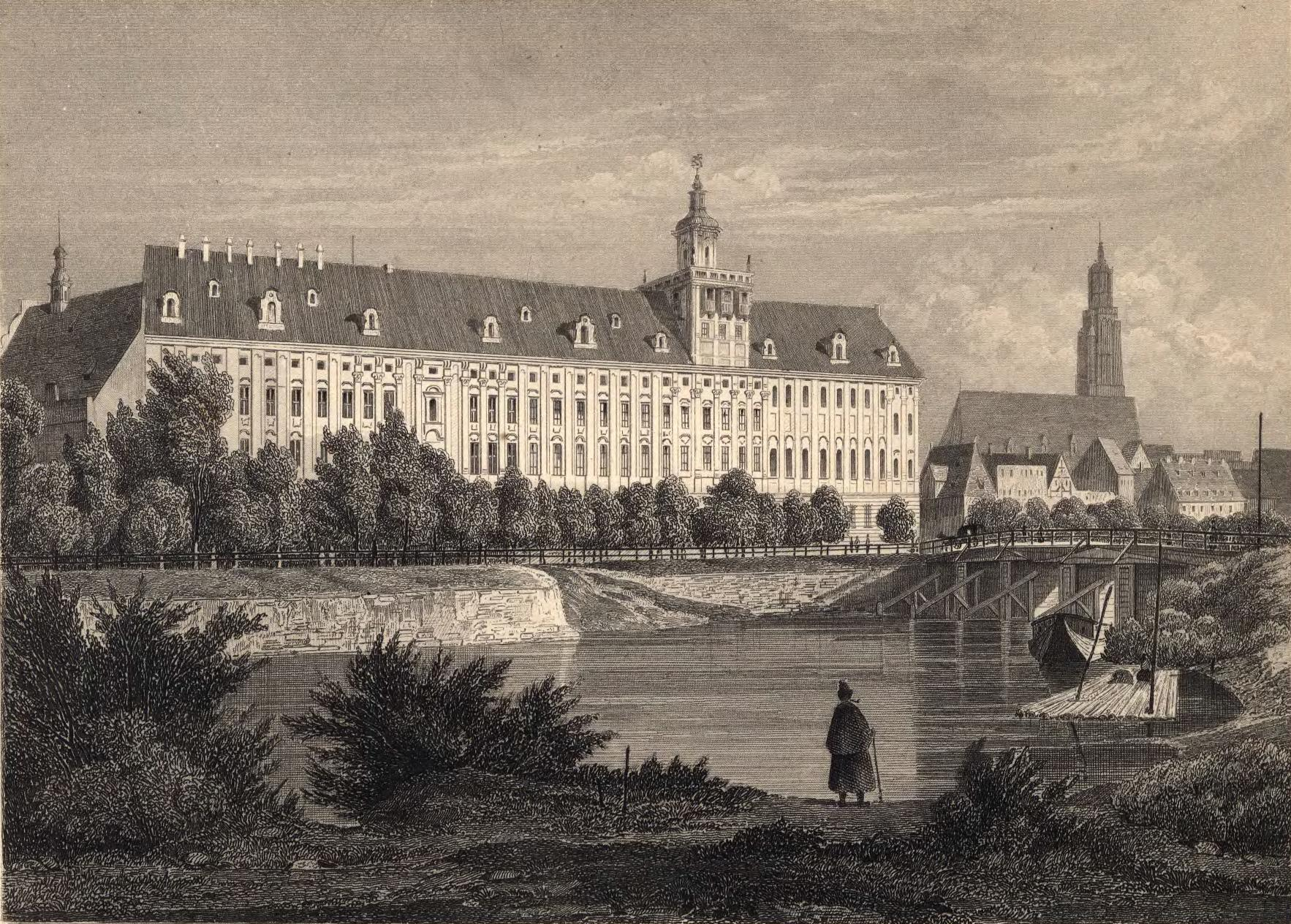
View of the University of Breslau from across the Oder

Neumann was afterwards engaged as a teacher of Hebrew in the University of Breslau, in which, besides Professor Braniss, Professor Fischer, Professor of Chemistry—another brother-in-law of his—were distinguishing themselves. Neumann died suddenly, on 3 March 1865. His second son became Professor of Medicine in the University of Breslau.

== Works ==
Neumann wrote, besides his Commentary on Amos, Nahum, Haggai, Zechariah, and Malachi, which was published at Dessau in 1805, under the title, ת"א ובאור קצת תרי עסר עם, a Hebrew Chrestomathy in 2 volumes (Breslau, 1821).

== See also ==
- History of the Jews in Brody
- History of Jewish conversion to Christianity
