= Hakan Taştan and Turan Topal =

Turkish converts from Islam to Christianity

Hakan Taştan and Turan Topal are two Turkish converts from Islam to Christianity who went on trial on November 23, 2006, several days before a visit to Turkey by Pope Benedict XVI on accused of insulting 'Turkishness' under Article 301 of the Turkish penal code and inciting religious hatred against Islam.

Turan Topal converted to Christianity in 1989 whereas Hakan Taştan converted in 1994.

== Charges ==
They were accused of insulting Turkish heritage and inciting hate against Muslims while allegedly trying to convert other Turks to Christianity. They were charged under Turkey's Article 301, which has been used to bring charges against dozens of Turkish intellectuals. According to the written charges, the three plaintiffs, identified as Fatih Kose, 23, Alper, 16, and Oguz, 17, claimed the two Christians had called Islam a "primitive and fabricated religion" and had described Turks as a "cursed people."

They also accused the defendants of opposing the Turkish military, encouraging sexual misconduct, procuring funds from abroad to entice young people in Silivri to become Christians and secretly compiling data on private citizens for a local Bible correspondence course.

The newspaper Zaman even claimed that the two Christians were connected to Hakan Ekinci, the man who on October 3 hijacked a Turkish Airlines plane to Italy where he claimed to be Christian and a conscientious objector, and had appealed to Pope Benedict XVI for asylum.

The spokesman for the Alliance of Protestant Churches in Turkey, İsa Karataş, says that there is no evidence against them. He claims that charges filed against them are based only on verbal allegations without any proof.

They have had several hearings since November, 2006, the most recent being April 18, 2007. Another hearing is scheduled for July 18, 2007 reportedly because one of the accusers did not show up. The next hearing was held in Silivri, Turkey, in September 2007, where the judge excused himself from the trial. He then referred the case to a judge in a higher court district in Istanbul. In July 2007 they were summoned by the police and ordered to pay a fine for collecting money without a permission. This first hearing was scheduled for December 29, 2007. The trials did not actually occur until 2010.

== Verdict ==
In March 2009 Tastan and Topal were found guilty of 'illegal collection of funds' and were fined 600 Turkish lira; this was regarding their receiving church offerings without government permission.

In October 2010, the pair were found not guilty of ‘offending Turkishness’.
