= Haik Hovsepian Mehr =

Iranian bishop (1945–1994)

- Born: January 6, 1945; Tehran, Iran
- Died: 19 January 1994 (aged 49)

Haik Hovsepian Mehr (Armenian: Հայկ Հովսեփյան Մեհր; January 6, 1945, Tehran – January 19, 1994) was an Iranian Armenian Protestant minister and bishop of the Jama'at-e Rabbani church (part of the Assemblies of God church movement). After the Islamic Revolution of 1979, he was one of the few Christian leaders to continue to evangelize. In 1994, he disappeared after protesting the Iranian government's treatment of converts to Christianity and is generally assumed to have been murdered by the state.

== Early life ==
Hovsepian was born in 1945 in Tehran, Iran into an Armenian Apostolic middle-class family. He had three younger brothers: Edward, Roubik and George. When he was 15, he joined the Pentecostal Protestant group the Assemblies of God, derived from the Assemblies of God USA. In 1966, upon completion of his mandatory military service, Haik married Takoosh Ginagosian. In 1967, he pastored his first church in Majidieh, a suburb of the capital Tehran. Not long afterwards, he served in the military and was stationed in Gorgan, a city in Mazanderan, a northern province of Iran near the Caspian Sea, where he established a house church.

In 1969 Hovsepian, his wife and their six-month-old child were driving from Tehran to Gorgan with an American missionary family, when their car struck an unlit tractor-trailer. The four children aboard were killed. The adult passengers survived, but Hovsepian and Takoosh suffered broken legs, from which they recovered.

== Pentecostal ministry ==
They returned to Gorgan, where they served in church pastoral work despite hardship and persecution. Hovsepian had a strong motivation to evangelise Iranian Muslims into his Evangelical Protestant group. He was an outspoken Pentecostal apologist, evangelist and a musician.

He was responsible for initiating increased collaboration between evangelical churches within Iran after the Iranian Revolution. He became the Chairman of the Council of Protestant Ministers of Iran.

Hovsepian claimed to speak up for the rights of Christians in Iran. In 1993 he was one of only two church leaders to refuse to sign a declaration stating that they would not allow Muslims or Muslim converts into their churches. He also refused to sign a statement that Christians enjoyed full rights in Iran. He compiled a detailed report on violations of religious freedom and invited Professor Reynaldo Galindo Pohl, the United Nations Special Representative to Iran, to visit the country and meet Protestant ministers and government officials to discuss these violations. He also met the Ministry for Islamic Guidance for Minorities to call for the government to respect the rights of religious minorities set out in the 1979 Constitution. Bishop Hovsepian and the denomination he represented, the Assemblies of God, were ordered to comply with the following directives:

1. Church services could not be held in Persian, the official language of Iran;
2. Church members must be issued membership cards and produce them upon attendance;
3. Membership lists, complete with addresses, must be handed over to governmental authorities;
4. Meetings must be confined to Sunday, not Friday the officially recognized day of Muslim worship;
5. Only members could attend Sunday meetings; and
6. New members could only be added to the membership and admitted to meetings once the Ministry of Information and Islamic Guidance had been notified.

Haik deliberately disobeyed and defiantly declared that "Never would [he or his ministers] bow down and comply with such inhumane and unjust demands" and that "our churches are open to all who want to come in."

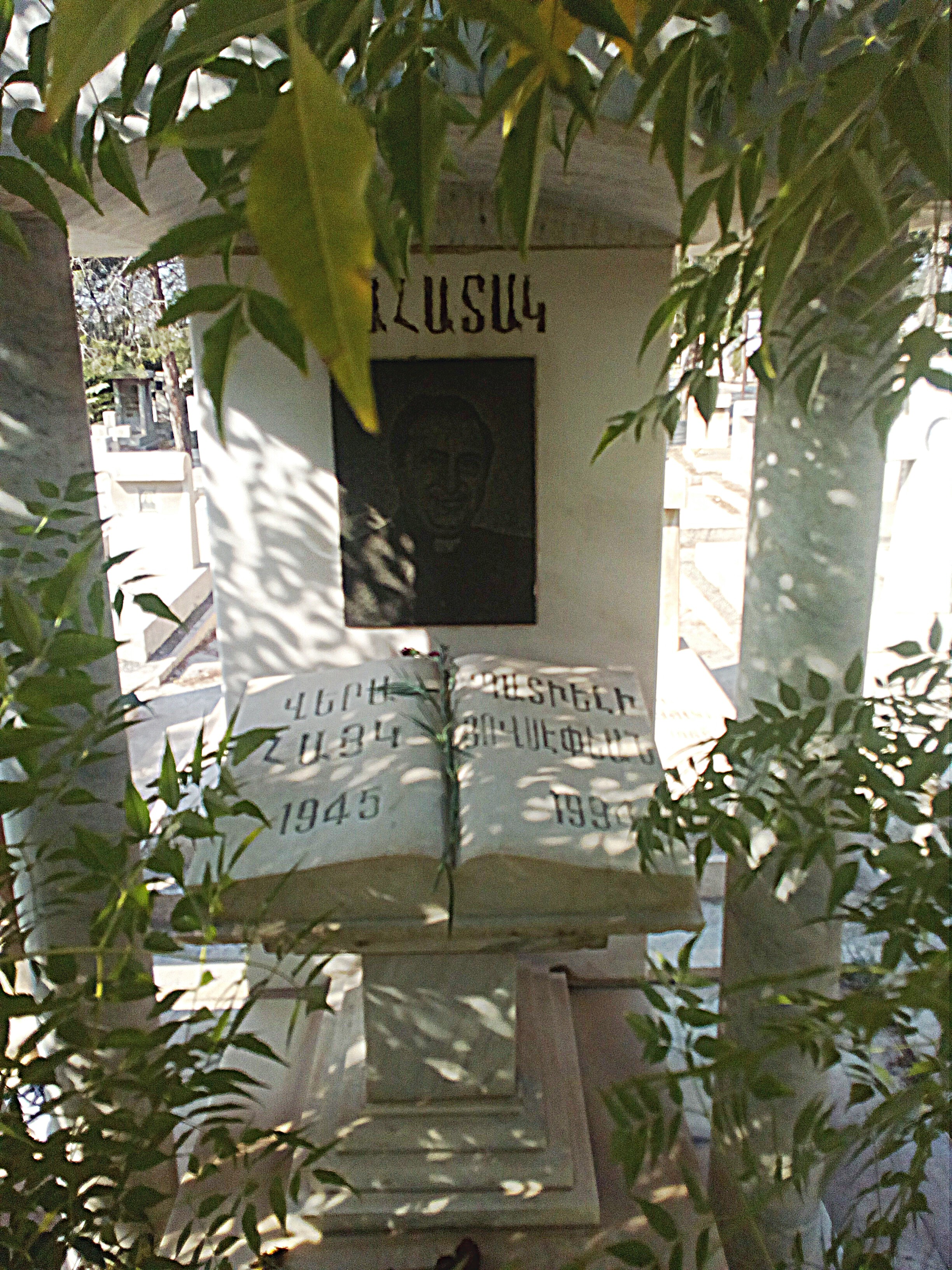
Haik Hovsepian tomb in 2017

He was killed after protesting about the treatment of his friend and colleague Mehdi Dibaj at the hands of the Iranian government. Hovsepian mounted a campaign for Dibaj, and on January 16, 1994, Dibaj was released. Three days later Hovsepian vanished from Tehran. His death was reported to his family on January 30, 1994. While the government initially denied all involvement, Iranian Protestants and independent observers claimed that he was murdered for his beliefs.

There is, of course, widespread suspicion that the Iranian authorities were responsible for the death of Bishop Haik.

Reverting to the murder, I have seen in the media no evidence of a wholehearted investigation into its cause or to find out who actually committed it.

Lord Ennals and Viscount Brentford, House of Lords, 3rd March 1994

== Arresting two suspects ==
On July 5, 1994, two women were arrested by the state. While the Iranian state blamed the People's Mujahedin of Iran for Mehr's murder, United Nations Special Rapporteur on the question of religious intolerance Abdelfattah Amor made a visit to Iran in 1995 where he was able to speak freely in Evin prison with the women charged. Amor concluded in his UN report that the Iranian Government had apparently decided to execute Bishop Hovsepian Mehr and two other Evangelical Protestant leaders in order not only to discredit the Mujahedin organization by declaring it responsible for those crimes, but also, to decapitate the Protestant community.

== Legacy ==
Takoosh and her four children (Rebekkah, Joseph, Gilbert, and Andre) eventually migrated to California, surrounded by a large diaspora of Armenians and Iranians, including family members and friends from Tehran. Takoosh and her children are frequently asked to speak at conferences, and their children are in different Christian ministries. Haik's brothers, who work as pastors, are also ministering outside Iran.
