= Taysir Abu Saada =

Palestinian-American Christian missionary (born 1951)

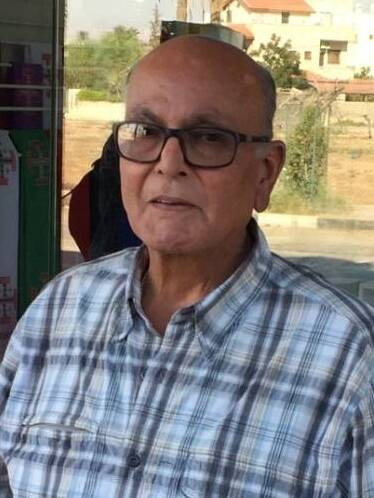

Personal details
- Born: تيسير أبو سعدة; 3 February 1951 Gaza Strip
- Died: 1 April 2026 (aged 75) Amman
- Occupation: Founder of the Christian ministry Hope for Ishmael
- Known for: Former personal driver of Yasir Arafat, his conversion to Christianity, for leaving the PLO, and for his move to America. Palestine Liberation Organization (former member)

Taysir Abu Saada (Arabic: تيسير أبو سعدة; 3 February 1951 – 1 April 2026), also known as Tass Saada, was an author born 1951 in the Gaza Strip and then grew up in Saudi Arabia and Qatar. He was a former member of the PLO, who converted to Christianity and became the founder of the humanitarian organizations Hope for Ishmael and Seeds of Hope. Before Saada's conversion, he was Yasir Arafat's personal driver.

== Bibliography ==
- Once an Arafat man (2008)
- The mind of terror (2016)

== See also ==
- Mosab Hassan Yousef
- Gabriel Naddaf
- Walid Shoebat
