= Breitenbach am Herzberg =

- Municipality
- Coat of arms

- Location of Breitenbach am Herzberg within Hersfeld-Rotenburg district
- Interactive map of Breitenbach am Herzberg
- Location within Germany Location within Hesse
- Coordinates: 50°46′N 09°31′E
- Country: Germany
- State: Hesse
- Admin. region: Kassel
- District: Hersfeld-Rotenburg
- Subdivisions: 5 districts

Government
  - Mayor (2020–26): Volker Jaritz

Area
  - Total: 42.14 km^{2} (16.27 sq mi)
- Elevation: 257 m (843 ft)

Population (2025-12-31)
  - Total: 1,651
  - Density: 39.18/km^{2} (101.5/sq mi)
- Time zone: UTC+01:00 (CET)
  - Summer (DST): UTC+02:00 (CEST)
- Postal codes: 36287
- Dialling codes: 06675
- Vehicle registration: HEF
- Website: www.breitenbach-am-herzberg.de

Breitenbach am Herzberg (officially Breitenbach a. Herzberg) is a municipality in southwesternmost Hersfeld-Rotenburg district in eastern Hesse, Germany.

== Geography ==
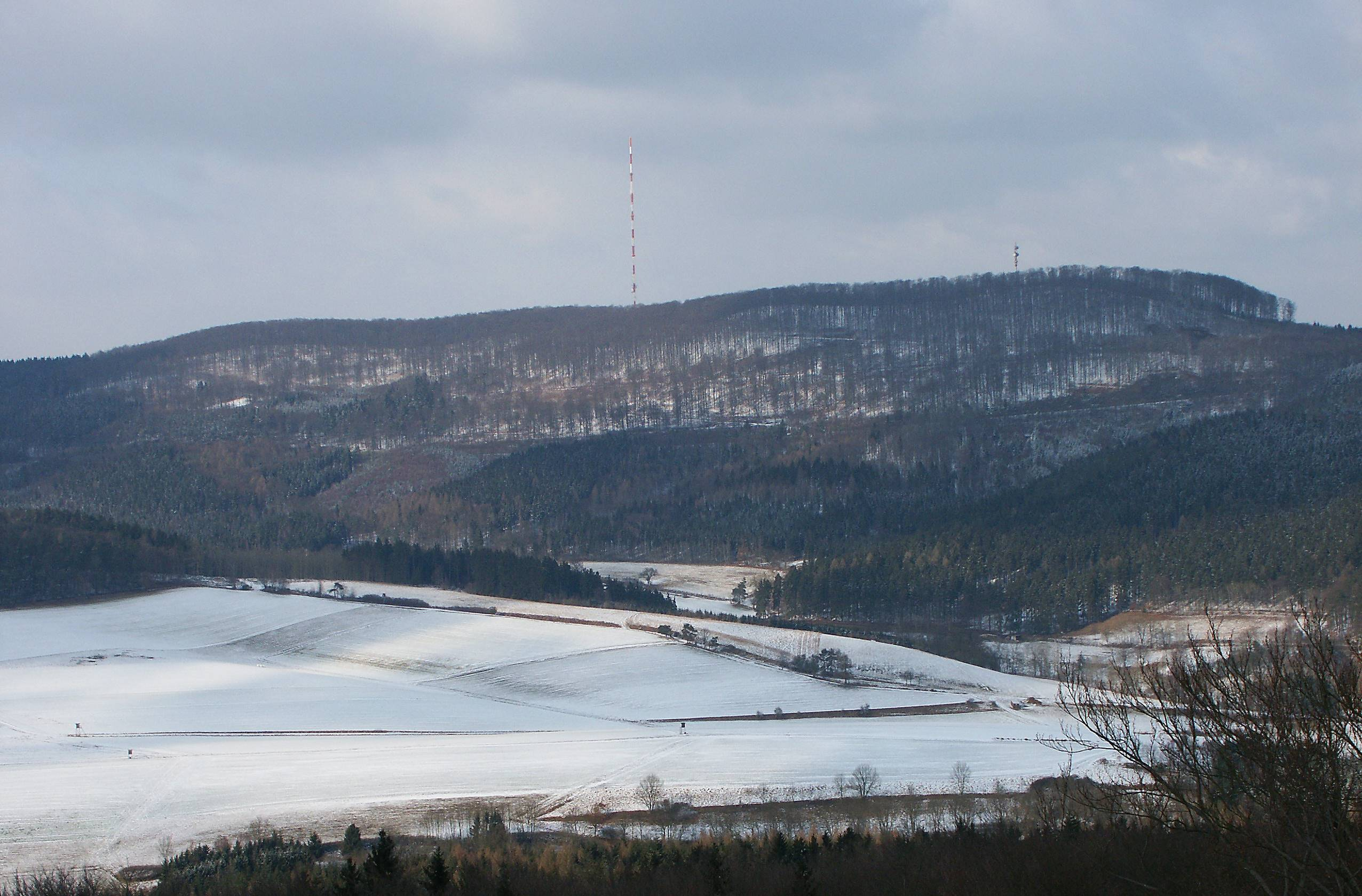
Rimberg seen from the castle

=== Location ===
The community lies at the foot of the Hirschberg (often also known as the Herzberg) and the Rimberg in the southern Knüllgebirge (range). The constituent communities are scattered through the Jossa valley and its side valleys.

The municipal area’s lowest point is to be found on the Jossa in the constituent community of Oberjossa and lies 234 m above sea level. Its highest point lies 529 m above sea level on the slopes of the Rimberg.

The community lies between Alsfeld (some 18 km to the west) and Bad Hersfeld (some 20 km to the northeast).

=== Neighbouring communities ===
Breitenbach borders in the north on the communities of Ottrau and Oberaula (both in the Schwalm-Eder-Kreis), in the east on the communities of Kirchheim and Niederaula (both in Hersfeld-Rotenburg), in the south on the towns of Schlitz and Grebenau and in the west on the town of Alsfeld (all three in the Vogelsbergkreis).

=== Constituent communities ===
Breitenbach’s Ortsteile are Breitenbach, Hatterode, Oberjossa, Gehau and Machtlos.

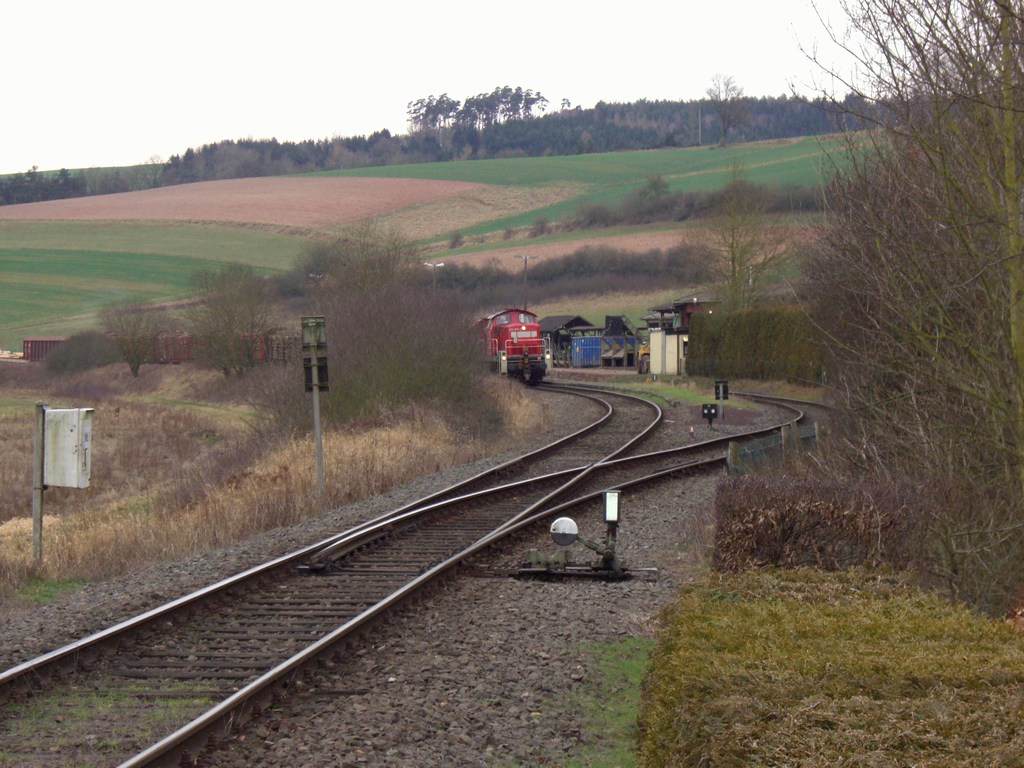
Goods train at the end of the Gründchenbahn

== History ==
In 1290, Breydenbach apud stratam bi dem Herzisberg had its first documentary mention. The document itself deals, however, with other, older documents, leading to the supposition that the villages arose as early as some time between 400 and 800.

From 1290 to 1298, Herzberg Castle was built on the trade road Kurze Hessen by Heinrich von Romrod. Heinrich acquired the area around the village as a fief from the Landgraves of Hesse.

In 1372 and 1373, the castle was a main stronghold under Friedrich von Herzberg of the Sternerbund, a knightly order that in the last fourth of the 14th century was fighting against the growing power of the Landgraves of Hesse. Over several hundred years thereafter, the castle and later state fort of Herzberg was held by the Barons of Dörnberg.

=== Amalgamations ===
With effect from 31 December 1971, the communities of Breitenbach, Hatterode and Oberjossa willingly merged, founding the new greater community of Breitenbach am Herzberg. The centres of Gehau and Machtlos joined them in the course of municipal reform on 1 July 1972.

== Politics ==
=== Community council ===
The municipal election held on 14 March 2021 yielded the following results:

Parties and voter communities		% 2021	Seats; 2021	% 2016	Seats; 2016
SPD	Social Democratic Party of Germany	47.6	6	48.7	6
BFH	Bundesfinanzhof	52.4	7	51.3	7
Total		100.0	13	100.0	13
Voter turnout in %		58.5		53.8	

The community’s executive (Gemeindevorstand) is made up of five members, with three seats allotted to the SPD and 1 to the FWG.

=== Mayors ===
Volker Jaritz was elected mayor in a runoff election on 10 February 2008 with 65.5% of the vote. He succeeded Siegfried Steube (FWG), who had been elected on 27 January 2002 with 71.7% of the vote. Before him came Paul Orth (SPD), who was elected on 3 March 1996 with 70.8% of the vote.

=== Coat of arms ===
The community’s arms might be described thus: Bendy wavy sinister argent and azure a crenellated tower party per bend gules and Or royally crowned, thereover a mullet of six counterchanged.

The tower stands for Herzberg Castle. The mullet of six (six-pointed star) recalls the knightly order of the Sternerbund (Stern is German for “star”), who had an important stronghold in the castle. The tinctures gold and red come from the arms borne by the Barons of Dörnberg, who held the castle beginning in 1477.

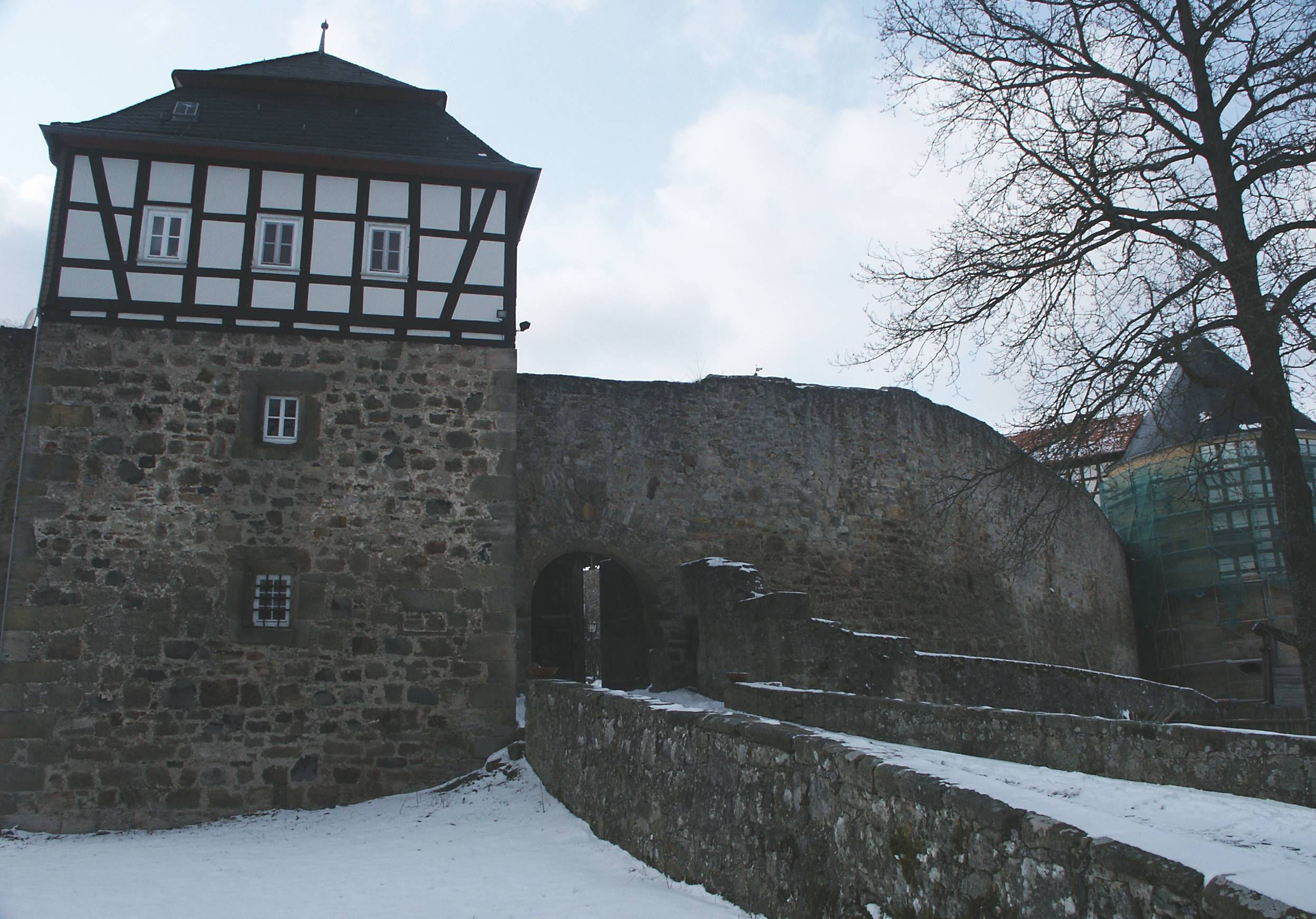
Burg Herzberg

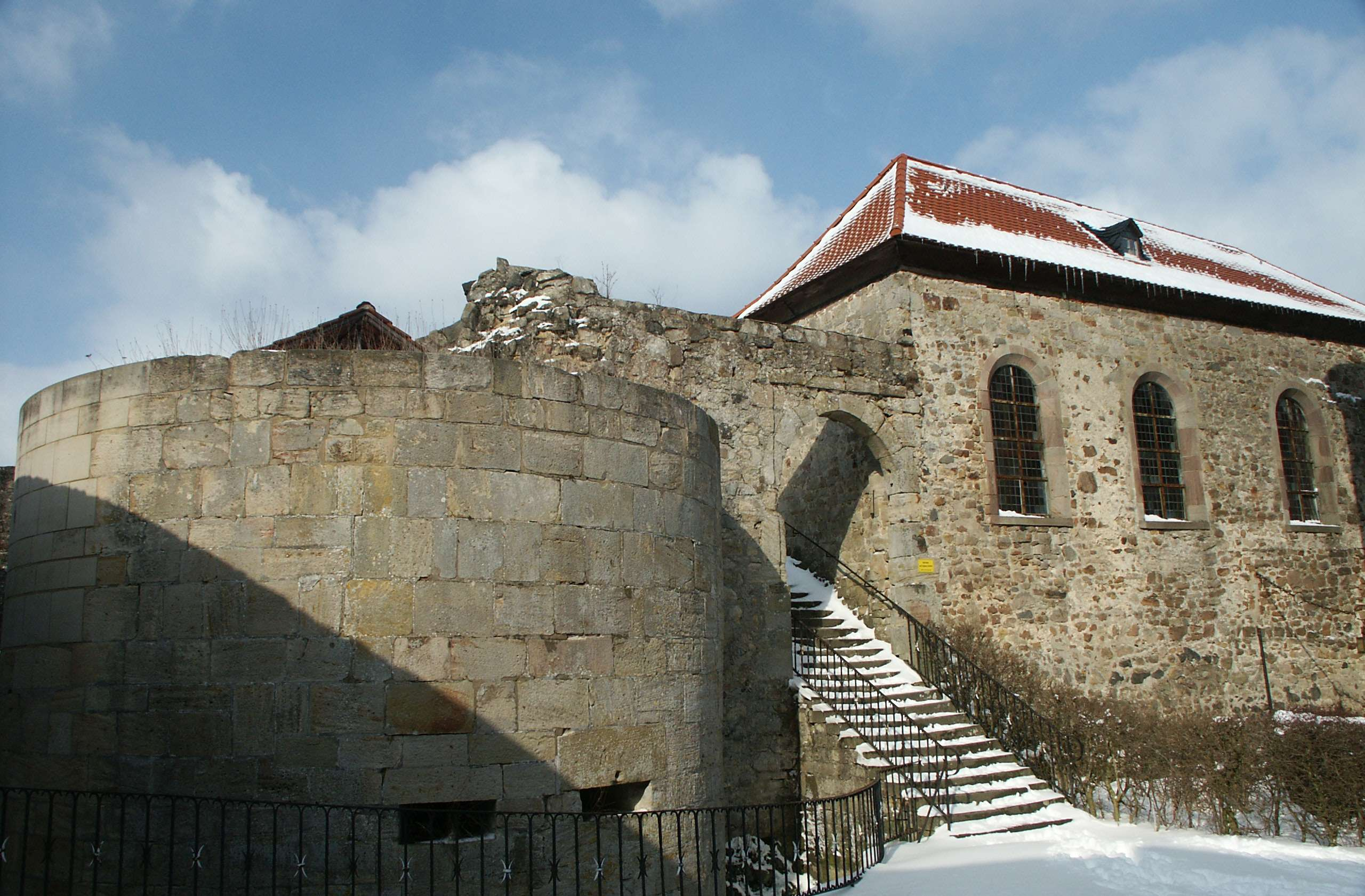
Castle chapel and keep ruins, both built about 1290

== Culture and sightseeing ==
=== Buildings ===
- Burg Herzberg (Herzberg Castle), Hesse’s biggest hilltop castle, on the Hirschberg (formerly Herzisberg)

=== Regular events ===
- Burg-Herzberg-Festival, open-air festival, every summer
- Kobold-Kirmes (church consecration festival)
- Knightly tournament with the Castle Market (Burgmarkt)
