= Iranian Assemblies of God Church =

Iranian Christian church

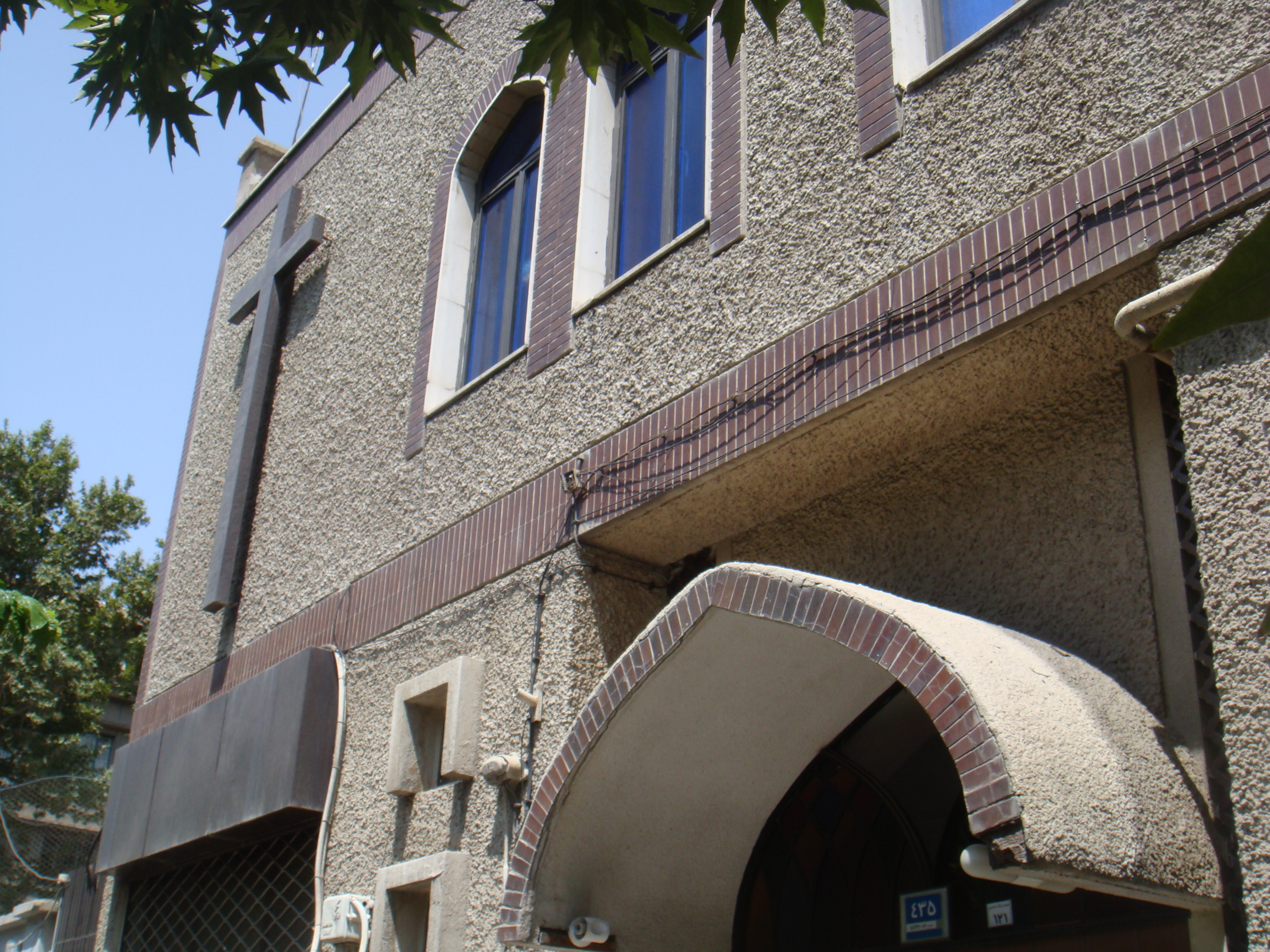
Central Assemblies of God Church of Tehran

Iranian Assemblies of God Church (Persian: جماعت ربانی) is the Iranian branch of the Assemblies of God, one of the largest evangelical Pentecostal Christian churches. It has its centre in Tehran, Iran.

Many (about 80%) of its adherents are converts from Islam, the remainder are converts from Iranian Christian ethnic minorities. The services are conducted in Persian and Armenian.

== Controversy ==
In the mid-1990s, Bishop Haik Hovsepian Mehr, head of the Iranian Assemblies of God, was ordered to comply with the following directives:

- No church service must be conducted in Persian language (the language of the people)
- All members must be issued with membership cards and their admittance to the services would be on production of the appropriate card.
- Photocopies of these cards and appropriate membership lists with their addresses to be given to the competent authorities.
- Sunday meetings were to be for members only. No meetings to be held on any other day, in particular Friday.
- No new members may be admitted without informing the appropriate department of the Ministry of Information and Islamic Guidance.

=== Reaction ===
The late bishop stated that "Never would he or his ministers bow down and comply with such inhumane and unjust demands" and that "our churches are open to all who want to come in."

Several churches have been forced to close by the Iranian regime. These include a building in Kerman and another in Ahwaz, both used by the Anglican and Presbyterian congregations in those cities; and the Assemblies of God Church in Gorgan. (This was the only evangelical church in the whole of Mazanderan province, and with its closure, there is nowhere for evangelical Christians to worship.) Various church house-groups have also been closed down in Sari and Mashad and Ahwaz and the Christians there are strictly forbidden to meet.

Despite guarantees of religious freedom for Christians in Article 13 of the Iranian constitution, it remains an offence to sell a copy of the Bible in Iran, which is practically impossible anyway, since the offices of the Iranian Bible Society were closed in 1980 and all its stocks confiscated by the State authorities. Despite all denials at the official level the Law on Apostasy is practised and remains in force. It is under this law that converts from Islam to other religions are subject to capital punishment.

In 1989, the Rev. Hossein Soodmand was executed for apostasy. Although born a Muslim, by 1989 Hossein had been a Christian for 25 years. He was an evangelist and the pastor of the Assemblies of God (AOG) Church in Mashad. Despite pleas for clemency by fellow pastors to the Dayro-E-Tasalamat (an Ombudsman and Muslim cleric-literally, "he who hears the cries of the oppressed"), Hossein was hanged on 3 December 1989 at the insistence of the Ombudsman. He left a blind wife and four children.

Mehdi Dibaj, a Muslim convert to Christianity, was imprisoned for nearly 9 years. During that time, he endured 2 years in solitary confinement and was subjected to mock executions. He was imprisoned by the Sharia court in Sari on three charges: that he had "insulted Islam, the prophet Muhammad and Ayatollah Khomeini" in a letter; that he was acting as a spy for the West; and that he was an apostate.

Iran's Supreme Court on two occasions dismissed the first charge on grounds that the letter was not proved to be in Hossein's handwriting and the second charge as unfounded. He continued to remain in prison solely on grounds of apostasy. In 1994, he was sentenced to death for apostasy and only after an international campaign for his release was he allowed out of prison on January 16 of that year.

Dibaj was abducted on Friday, June 24, 1994. His body was found in a west Tehran park on Tuesday, July 5, 1994.
