= Mehdi Dibaj =

Iranian Pentecostal pastor (1935-1994)

- Mehdi Dibaj
- Born: 1935; Iran
- Died: 5 July 1994 (aged 58–59)

Mehdi Dibaj (1935 – June/July 1994) was an Iranian Pentecostal Protestant convert from Shia Islam and pastor. He belonged to the Iranian Assemblies of God Church, a branch of the Assemblies of God, derived from the Assemblies of God USA. After the Iranian Revolution, he was imprisoned without trial and was subsequently setenced to death for apostasy from Islam. His case gained international media attention and he was subsequently released by the Iranian government. However, he was subsequently abducted and killed in Tehran. He is considered a martyr by the Assemblies of God.

== Background ==
Dibaj became a Protestant as a young man and joined the Presbyterian church, but years later, he joined the church of Assembly of God, the Iranian Assemblies of God Church, a branch of the Assemblies of God, derived from the Assemblies of God USA. After the 1979 Iranian revolution he encountered difficulties. In 1983 he was arrested and imprisoned without trial in Sari and systematically tortured. During his imprisonment he was held in solitary confinement in a dark cell a metre in height, width and depth for two years. He was finally tried by an Islamic court in Sari on 3 December 1993 and sentenced to death on charges of apostasy.

On 18 January 1994, Bernard Levin, a prominent veteran British Jewish journalist, reprinted Dibaj's courtroom speech in place of his usual column in the London-based newspaper The Times as a mark of respect.

Following a worldwide outcry initiated by his friend and colleague Bishop Haik Hovsepian Mehr, Dibaj was finally freed in January 1994, although the death sentence was not lifted. Just three days later Haik Hovsepian Mehr was murdered. The Times article and the murder of Hovsepian Mehr was alluded to in a debate in the British House of Lords on Iran, and Viscount Brentford cited Levin's comment, 'how insubstantial must the grasp on a religion be, if it has to be propped up by hangings and woundings and beatings and murderings?'

Dibaj was abducted on Friday, 24 June 1994. His body was found in a west Tehran park on Tuesday, 5 July 1994.

== See also ==
- List of kidnappings
- Lists of solved missing person cases
- List of unsolved murders (1980–1999)
