= Adolf =

Name list

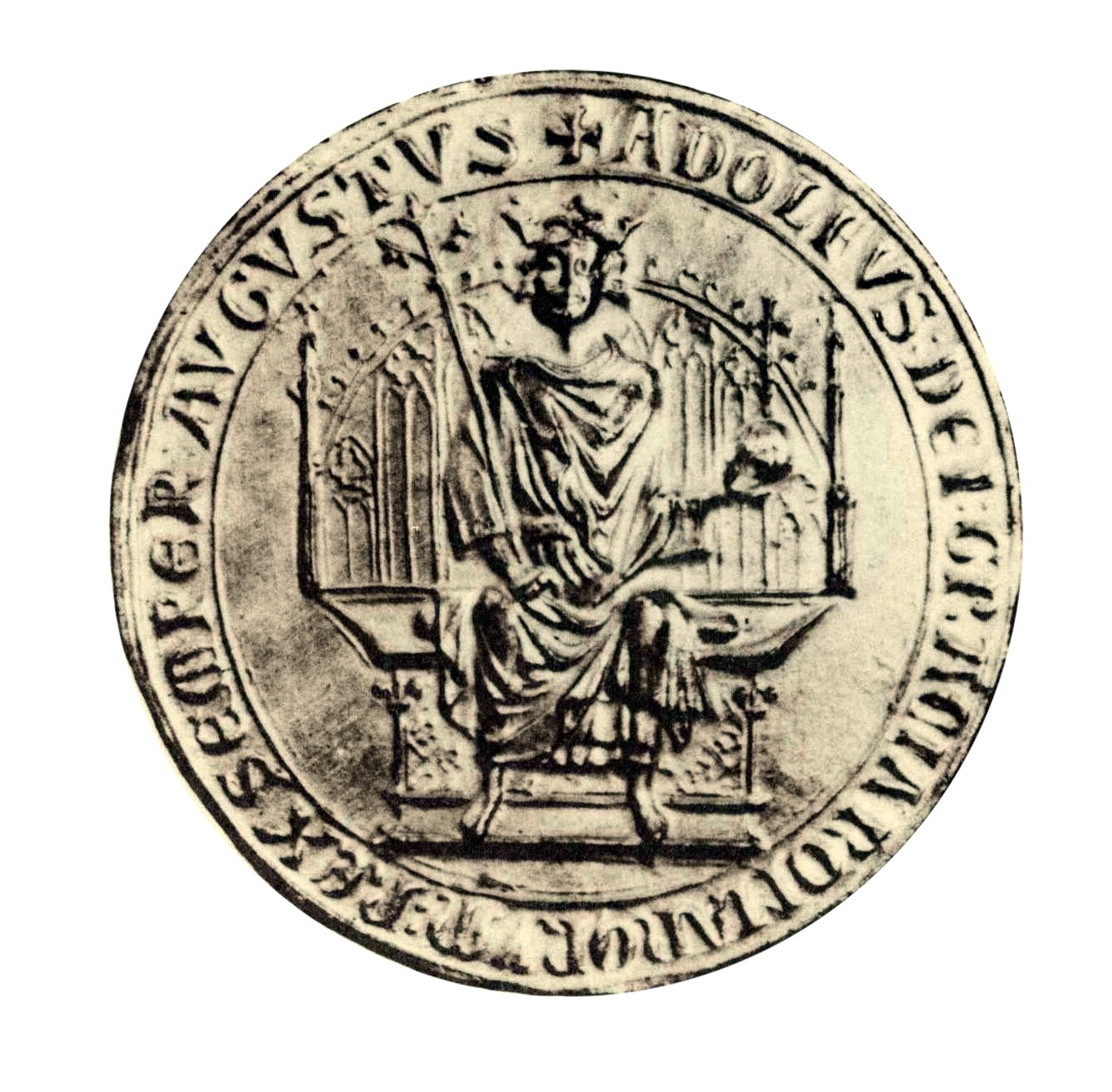
- King Adolf of Germany
- Pronunciation: German pronunciation: [ˈaːdɔlf]
- Gender: Male
- Language: German, Swedish, Norwegian, Danish, French, Italian, Spanish, Welsh, Portuguese

Origin
- Meaning: Noble wolf, Wolf power or Bright wolf

Other names
- Variant forms: Adi (nickname), Addie (nickname), Ady (nickname), Addy (nickname), Alf (short), Alfie (nickname), Adolff, Adolph, Adolphe, Ādolfs, Adolphus, Adolfo, Aatu, Dolfy (nickname), Dolphy (nickname), Adalwolf, Waldwolf

Adolf (also spelt Adolph or Adolphe, Adolfo, and when Latinised Adolphus) is a given name with German origins.

The name is a compound derived from the Old High German Athalwolf (or Hadulf), a composition of athal, or adal, meaning "noble" (or had(u)-, meaning "battle, combat"), and wolf. The name is cognate to the Anglo-Saxon name Æthelwulf (also Eadulf or Eadwulf). The name can also be derived from the ancient Germanic elements "Wald" meaning "power", "brightness" and wolf (Waldwulf).

Due to its extremely negative associations with the Nazi leader Adolf Hitler, the name has greatly declined in popularity since the end of World War II.

Similar names include Lithuanian Adolfas and Latvian Ādolfs. The female forms Adolphine and Adolpha are far more rare than the male names.

== Popularity and usage ==
Before the 20th-century, Adolf was a relatively common name for baby boys in German-speaking countries and to a lesser extent also in French-speaking regions of Europe (spelled as Adolphe in France). After Adolf Hitler came to power in Nazi Germany, the name became more fashionable in German-speaking Europe until the early 1940s. However, after the defeat of Germany, and the revelations about the atrocities of the Nazi regime, the negative associations with Hitler meant that the name has declined in use as a given name for males to the extent of statistical irrelevance, though some Germans continue using the name due to family tradition. Adolf Dassler (1900-1978), the founder of Adidas, preferred to use his nickname, 'Adi', in his professional life and for the name of his company.

Similarly, the French version, Adolphe, previously a fairly common name in France and the name of a classic novel by Benjamin Constant, has virtually disappeared, as has the Italian version Adolfo. In Matthieu Delaporte and Alexandre de La Patellière’s 2010 play What's in a Name?, and its 2012 film adaptation, a couple pranks their dinner guests by announcing that they will name their unborn child Adolphe, in homage to Constant’s novel, which backfires and starts a series of arguments. However, the Spanish and Portuguese version, Adolfo, has not become stigmatised in the same way and is still in common use.

== Monarchs and nobles ==
- Ealdwulf of East Anglia (c. 634 – 713), King of East Anglia
- Adulf mcEtulfe (died 934), King of Bamburgh
- Eadwulf Evil-child (fl. 968–970), ruler of Bamburgh
- Adolf Frederick, King of Sweden (1710–1771)
- Adolf I, Prince of Schaumburg-Lippe (1817–1893)
- Adolf II, Prince of Schaumburg-Lippe (1883–1936)
- Adolf of Altena (1157–1220), Archbishop of Cologne
- Adolf of Nassau (1540–1568), Count of Nassau, brother of William the Silent
- Adolf, Count Palatine of the Rhine (1300–1327)
- Adolf, Duke of Bavaria (1434–1441)
- Adolf, Duke of Holstein-Gottorp (1526–1586)
- Adolf, Duke of Jülich-Berg (1370–1437)
- Adolf, King of the Romans (1255–1298), King of Germany
- Adolph I, Prince of Anhalt-Köthen (d. 1473)
- Adolph II, Prince of Anhalt-Köthen (1458–1526)
- Adolphe, Grand Duke of Luxembourg (1817–1905)
- Adolphus Cambridge, 1st Marquess of Cambridge (1868–1927)
- Adolphus Frederick II, Duke of Mecklenburg-Strelitz (1658–1708)
- Adolphus VIII, Count of Holstein (1401–1459), Duke of southern Jutland
- Adulf Evil-child (fl. AD 973), more commonly known as Eadwulf Evil-child, Earl of Bamburgh
- Audulf (fl. c. 600), a Frisian lord or moneyer known for his golden tremisses
- Ernest Augustus William Adolphus George Frederick, Crown Prince of Hanover (1845–1923)
- Gustaf IV Adolf (1778–1837), King of Sweden
- Gustaf VI Adolf (1882–1973), King of Sweden
- Gustavus Adolphus of Sweden (1594–1632), King of Sweden
- Prince Adolf of Schaumburg-Lippe (1859–1917), regent of Lippe
- Prince Adolphus, Duke of Cambridge (1774–1850), son of George III of the United Kingdom
- Prince Gustaf Adolf, Duke of Västerbotten (1906–1947), Prince of Sweden

== Saints ==
- Saint Adulf, early medieval Anglo-Saxon saint
- St. Adolphus, 9th-century Spanish martyr
- St. Adolf of Osnabrück, 13th-century German martyr
- St. Adolphus Ludigo-Mkasa, 19th-century Ugandan martyr

== People with the given name in any variant ==
=== Adolf ===
==== A–G ====
- Adolf Albin (1848–1920), Romanian chess player
- Adolf Althoff (1913–1998), German circus owner
- Adolf Anderssen (1818–1879), German chess player
- Adolf Appellöf (1857–1921), Swedish zoologist
- Gustav Badin né Adolf Ludvig Gustav Fredrik Albert Couchi (1747/1750 – 1822), Swedish court servant
- Adolf von Baeyer (1835–1917), German chemist who synthesised indigo and developed a nomenclature for cyclic compounds
- Adolf Bastian (1826–1905), German anthropologist
- Adolf Bauer (1940–2026), German politician
- Adolf Beck (1863–1942), Polish physician and pioneer of electroencephalography
- Adolf Beck case (1841–1909), Norwegian whose mistaken identity led to court of criminal appeal
- Adolf van den Berg (1978–2023), South African cricketer
- Adolf A. Berle (1895–1971), American lawyer, educator, author, and diplomat
- Ādolfs Bļodnieks (1889–1962), 9th Prime Minister of Latvia
- Adolf Bniński (1884–1942), Polish agricultural, conservative, and royalist activist
- Adolf Born (1930–2016), Czech artist and filmmaker
- Adolf Brand (1874–1945), German journalist
- Adolf Brudes (1899–1986), German racing driver
- Adolf Busch (1891–1952), German violinist and composer
- Adolf Butenandt (1903–1995), German biochemist
- Adolf Čech (1841–1903), Czech conductor
- Adolf Charlemagne or Sharleman, Russian painter (1826–1901)
- Adolf Cluss (1825–1905), German-American architect
- Adolf Daens (1839–1907), Belgian theologian
- Adolf "Adi" Dassler (1900–1978), German entrepreneur and founder of Adidas
- Adolf Dehn (1895–1968), American lithographer
- Adolf Deucher (1831–1912), Swiss politician
- Adolph Diesterweg (1790–1866), German educator
- Adolph Dubs (1920–1979), Assassinated American ambassador
- Adolf Dymsza (1900–1975), Polish comic actor
- Adolf Ehrnrooth (1905–2004), Finnish general
- Adolf Eichler (1869–1911), German civil architect
- Adolf Eichmann (1906–1962), German/Austrian Nazi SS officer
- Adolf Ellissen (1815–1872), German politician
- Adolf Etolin (1799–1876), Finnish explorer
- Adolf Eugen Fick (1829–1901), German inventor
- Adolf Fischer (officer) (1893–1947), German Nazi general
- Adolf Froelich (1887–1943), Polish inventor
- Adolf Furrer (1873–1958), Swiss inventor
- Adolf Galland (1912–1996), German fighter pilot
- Adolf Glassbrenner (1810–1876), German humourist
- Eddy Goldfarb (born 1921), birth name Adolf, American inventor of Yakity Yak Talking Teeth
- Adolf Grünbaum (1923–2018), German-American philosopher of science
- Adolf Guttmacher (1861–1915), German-American rabbi
- Adolf Guyer-Zeller (1839–1899), Swiss entrepreneur

==== H–M ====
- Adolf Abraham Halevi Fraenkel (1891–1965), German-Israeli mathematician
- Adolf Hamann (1885–1945), German Nazi general
- Adolf Hammerstein (1888–1941), German mathematician
- Adolf von Harnack (1851–1930), German theologian
- Johann Adolph Hasse (1699–1783), German composer
- Adolf Hedin (1834–1905), Swedish newspaper publisher and politician
- Adolf Hempt (1874–1943), Serbian biologist, founder of the Pasteur Institute in Novi Sad
- Adolf von Henselt (1814–1889), German composer
- Adolf Eduard Herstein (1869–1932), Polish-born painter and engraver
- Adolf Heusinger (1897–1982), German military officer
- Adolf von Hildebrand (1847–1921), German sculptor
- Adolf Bernhard Christoph Hilgenfeld (1823–1907), German theologian
- Adolf Hirémy-Hirschl (1860–1933), Hungarian Jewish artist
- Adolf Hirner (born 1965), Austrian ski jumper
- Adolf Hitler (1889–1945), German dictator and leader of the Nazi Party
- Adolf Hurwitz (1859–1919), German mathematician
- Adolf Holtzmann (1810–1870), German philologist
- Adolf Hütter (born 1970), Austrian footballer
- Adolf Jahr (1893–1946), Swedish actor and operetta singer
- Adolf Jensen (1837–1879), German pianist, composer, and teacher
- Adolf von Jordans (1892–1974), German ornithologist
- Adolf Just (1859–1936), German naturalist and founder of Luvos
- Adolf Kaufmann (1848–1916), Austrian landscape painter
- Adolf Kertész (1892–1920), Hungarian footballer
- Adolf Kneser (1862–1930), German mathematician
- Adolph Freiherr Knigge (1752–1796), German writer, Freemason
- Adolf Köster (1883–1930), German politician
- Adolf Kussmaul (1822–1902), German physician and the first to describe dyslexia
- Adolf Lande (1905 – c. 1970), German drug-control official
- Adolf Lindenbaum (1904–1941), Polish mathematician
- Adolf Loos (1870–1933), Austrian architect
- Adolf Lorenz (1854–1946), Austrian orthopedic surgeon
- Adolf Lundin (1932–2006), Swedish oil magnate
- Adolf Malan (born 1961), South African rugby union footballer
- Adolf Lu Hitler Marak (born c. 1958), Indian politician
- Adolf Mayer (1843–1942), German agricultural chemist who worked on tobacco mosaic disease
- Adolph Menzel (1815–1905), German painter
- Adolf Merckle (1934–2009), German entrepreneur and billionaire
- Adolf Meyer (architect) (1881–1929), German architect
- Adolf Meyer (psychiatrist) (1866–1950), Swiss-American psychiatrist

==== N–Z ====
- Adolf van Nieuwenaar (c. 1545 – 1589), Dutch statesman and soldier, stadtholder of Overijssel, Guelders and Utrecht
- Adolf Erik Nordenskiöld (1832–1901), Finnish-Swedish explorer
- Adolf Noreen (1854–1925), Swedish linguist
- Adolf Oberländer (1845–1923), German caricaturist
- Adolf Ogi (born 1942), Swiss politician
- Adolf Opálka (1915–1942), Czech anti-Nazi fighter
- Adolf Overweg (1822–1852), German scientist
- Adolf Petrovsky (1887–1937), Soviet diplomat
- Adolf Pilar von Pilchau (1851–1925), Baltic German politician
- Adolf Pilch (1914–2000), Polish resistance fighter
- Adolf Pinner (1842–1909), German chemist
- Adolf Real (1858–1916), mayor of Vaduz
- Adolf Reichwein (1898–1944), German educator and economist who resisted the policies of Nazi Germany
- Adolf Reinach (1883–1917), German phenomenologist
- Adolf Rosenberger (1900–1967), German-Jewish businessman, founder of the Porsche company
- Adolf Rudnicki (1912–1990), Polish-Jewish author
- Adolf Rzepko (1825–1892), Polish composer
- Adolf Friedrich von Schack (1815–1894), German poet
- Adolph Salomonsohn (1831–1919), German banker influenced the establishment of the German stock market
- Adolf Schallamach (1905–1997), German-born British scientist that worked on rubber friction
- Adolf Schaller (1956–2024), American visual artist
- Adolf Schärf (1890–1965), President of Austria
- Adolf Scherer (1938–2023), Slovak footballer of German descent
- Adolf Schlagintweit (1829–1857), German explorer
- Adolf Schmal (1872–1919), Austrian fencer
- Adolf Schreyer (1828–1899), German painter
- Adolf Schwarz (1836–1910), Austro-Hungarian chess master
- Adolf Seefeldt (1870–1936), known as The Sandman, German serial killer
- Adolf Shayevich (born 1937), Rabbi of the Moscow Choral Synagogue and one of two Chief Rabbis of Russia
- Adolf Smekal (1895–1959), Austrian physicist
- Adolf Stelzer (1908–1977), Swiss footballer
- Adolf Stieler (1775–1836), German cartographer
- Adolf Stoecker (1835–1909), German theologian
- Adolf Strauss (composer) (1902–1944), Czech pianist, violinist, composer, and kapellmeister
- Adolf Strauss (general) (1879–1973), general in the Wehrmacht of Nazi Germany
- Adolf Theuer (1920–1947), German SS officer at Auschwitz concentration camp
- Adolf Tolkachev (1927–1986), Soviet engineer and CIA spy
- Adolf von Sonnenthal (1834–1909), Austrian actor
- Adolf "Dado" Topić (born 1949), Croatian singer
- Adolf Tortilowicz von Batocki-Friebe (1868–1944), Lithuanian nobleman, lawyer and politician
- Adolf Uunona (born 1965), a Namibian politician
- Adolf Walbrook (1896–1967), Austrian actor
- Adolf Wahrmund (1827–1913), Austrian-German orientalist
- Adolf Ferdinand Weinhold (1841–1917), German chemist, physician and inventor
- Adolf Wilbrandt (1837–1911), German novelist
- Adolf Windaus (1876–1959), German chemist
- Adolf Wölfli (1864–1930), Swiss artist
- Adolf Zábranský (1909–1981), Czech illustrator and painter
- Adolf Zeising (1810–1876), German psychologist
- Adolf Ziegler (1892–1959), German painter and politician
- Adolf Zutter (1889–1947), German SS concentration camp officer
- Adolf Zytogorski (c. 1811/1812 – 1882), Polish-British chess master and translator

=== Adolfas ===
- Adolfas Ramanauskas (1918–1957), American born Lithuanian partisan
- Adolfas Valeška (1905–1994), Lithuanian-American artist

=== Adolfo ===
- Adolfo Aldana (born 1966), Spanish footballer
- Adolfo Aristarain (1943–2026), Argentine film director and screenwriter
- Adolfo Baines (born 1972), Spanish footballer
- Adolfo Battaglia (born 1930), Italian journalist and politician
- Adolfo Bautista (born 1979), Mexican footballer
- Adolfo Bruno (1945–2003), a.k.a. "Big Al", Italian-American mobster
- Adolfo Camarillo (1864–1958), American businessman, ranchero, philanthropist, co-founder of the city of Camarillo, California
- Adolfo Carrión Jr. (born 1961), served for seven years as borough president of the Bronx
- Adolfo Celi (1922–1986), Italian actor and director
- Adolfo Constanzo (1962–1989), American serial killer, drug trafficker, and cult leader
- Adolfo Correia da Rocha (1907–1995), Portuguese writer and otolaryngologist
- Adolfo Schwelm Cruz (1923–2012), Argentine racing driver
- Adolfo de la Huerta (1881–1955), President of Mexico in 1920
- Adolfo Domínguez (born 1950), Spanish fashion designer
- Adolfo Domínguez Gerardo (born 1991), Mexican footballer
- Adolfo Gaich (born 1999), Argentine footballer
- Adolfo Gregorio (born 1982), American footballer
- Adolfo Guzman (soccer) (born 1995), American footballer
- Adolfo Guzmán (1920–1976), Cuban pianist
- Adolfo Hernández (born 1997), Mexican footballer
- Adolfo Hirsch (born 1986), Argentine footballer
- Adolfo Kaminsky (1925–2023), Argentinian member of the French Resistance, document forger
- Adolfo Lima (born 1990), Uruguayan footballer
- Adolfo López Mateos (1909–1969), President of Mexico from 1958 to 1964
- Adolfo Luxúria Canibal (born 1959), Portuguese musician and lawyer
- Adolfo Machado (born 1985), Panamanian footballer
- Adolfo Miranda (born 1989), Spanish footballer
- Adolfo Muñoz (born 1997), Ecuadorian footballer
- Adolfo Olivares (1940–2025), Chilean footballer
- Adolfo Ovalle (born 1970), Chilean footballer
- Adolfo Ovalle (born 1997), Chilean footballer
- Adolfo Pérez Esquivel (born 1931), Argentine activist and Nobel Peace Prize winner
- Adolfo Ríos (born 1966), Mexican footballer
- Adolfo Ruiz Cortines (1889–1973), President of Mexico from 1952 to 1958
- Adolfo Sardiña (1933–2021), Cuban-American fashion designer, known by his first name alone
- Adolfo Sarti (1928–1992), Italian politician
- Adolfo Scilingo (born 1946), Argentinian Navy officer, criminal
- Adolfo Suárez (1932–2014), Spanish politician, the first democratically elected Prime Minister of Spain during the Spanish transition to democracy
- Adolfo Valencia (born 1968), Colombian footballer
- Adolfo Veber Tkalčević (1825–1889), Croatian philologist, writer, and politician
- Adolfo Vigorelli (1921–1944), Italian resistance fighter during World War II
- Adolfo Zumelzú (1902–1973), Argentine footballer

=== Adolph ===
- Adolph Achille Gereau (1893–1994), Virgin Islands civil servant and founder of V.I. Republicans
- Adolph Baller (1909–1994), Austrian-American pianist
- Adolph Bieberstein (1902–1981), American football player
- Adolph Caesar (1933–1986), American actor, voice-over artist, theatre director, dancer, and choreographer
- Adolph von Carlowitz (1858–1928), German general
- Adolph Coors (1847–1929), American businessman and founder of Coors Brewery
- Adolph "A.J." DeLaGarza (born 1987), American footballer
- Adolph Deutsch (1897–1980), British-American composer, conductor, and arranger
- Adolf Douai (1819–1888), German-Texan pioneer of the Kindergarten movement in America
- Adolph Monroe Edwards Jr. (1905–1987), American lawyer and statesman who served as Secretary of Guam from 1960 to 1961
- Adolph Fischer (1858–1887), German labor union activist
- Adolph Frank (1834–1916), German chemist
- Adolph Goldschmidt (1863–1944), German-Jewish art historian
- Adolph Gottlieb (1903–1974), American abstract expressionist painter, sculptor and printmaker
- Adolph Green (1914–2002), American lyricist and playwright
- Adolph Hallis (1896–1987), South African pianist, composer, and teacher
- Adolph Herseth (1921–2013), American orchestral trumpet player
- Adolph Sutro (1830–1898), mayor of San Francisco
- Adolph Jacobs (1939–2014), American guitar player
- Adolph Joffe (1883–1927), Russian-Jewish diplomat
- Adolph Johannes Brand (born 1934), South African pianist and composer known as Abdullah Ibrahim
- Adolph Kissell (1920–1983), American football player
- Adolph Kliebhan (1897–1963), American football player
- Adolph Koldofsky (1905–1951), Canadian violinist
- Adolph Kolping (1813–1865), German priest
- Adolph Kukulowicz (1933–2008), Canadian ice hockey player
- Adolph Malan (1910–1963), South African flying ace in World War II
- Adolph Marx, birth name of American comic actor Harpo Marx (1888–1961)
- Adolph Marix (1848–1919), American military officer and general
- Adolph Mongo (born 1954), American political strategist and commentator
- Adolph S. Moses (1840–1902), German-American rabbi
- Adolph Ochs (1858–1935), American newspaper publisher
- Adolph L. Reed Jr. (born 1947), American professor of political science and writer
- Adolph Rickenbacker (1887–1976), Swiss-American co-created the first electric string instrument, and co-founded the Rickenbacker
- Adolph G. Rosengarten (1870–1946), American chemist from Pennsylvania
- Adolph Rupp (1901–1977), American college basketball coach
- Adolph Sabath (1866–1952), American politician
- Adolph "Dolph" Schayes (1928–2015), American basketball player
- Adolph G. Schwenk (1922–2004), American Marine general
- Adolph "Young Dolph" Thornton (1985–2021), American independent rap artist
- Adolph Tidemand (1814–1876), Norwegian classical romantic painter
- Adolph Treidler (1886–1981), American artist known for his illustrations, posters, commercial art, and wartime propaganda posters
- Adolph von Carlowitz (1858–1928), German army commander during the First World War
- Adolph P. Yushkevich (1906–1993), Russian mathematician
- Adolph Zukor (1873–1976), Hungarian-Jewish American film mogul and founder of Paramount Pictures
- Hubert Blaine Wolfeschlegelsteinhausenbergerdorff Sr. (1914–1997), American typesetter whose actual name starts with "Adolph"

=== Adolphe ===
- Adolphe Adam (1803–1856), French composer and music critic
- Adolphe Alexandre Chaillet (1867–1914), French inventor of the Centennial Light
- Adolphe Crémieux (1796–1880), French-Jewish lawyer and statesman
- Adolphe Goldschmidt (1838–1918), German-Jewish co-inheritor of the Goldschmidt family bank
- Adolphe Guillaumat (1863–1940), French general during World War I
- Adolphe Hug (1923–2006), Swiss footballer
- Adolphe Marbot (1781–1844), French general
- Adolphe Max (1869–1939), Belgian politician and mayor of Brussels
- Adolphe Menjou (1890–1963), American actor and anti-Communist activist
- Adolphe Monod (1802–1856), French Protestant churchman
- Adolphe Monticelli (1824–1886), French painter preceding the Impressionists
- Adolphe Muzito (born 1957), Congolese politician who was Prime Minister of the Democratic Republic
- Adolphe Nourrit (1802–1839), French opera singer
- Adolphe Quetelet (1796–1874), Belgian astronomer, polymath
- Adolphe Pinard (1844–1934), French obstetrician and member of parliament
- Adolphe Sax (1814–1894), Belgian musician and inventor of the saxophone
- Adolphe Teikeu (born 1990), Cameroonian footballer
- Adolphe Thiers (1797–1877), French Prime Minister, President, and historian
- Adolphe Tohoua (born 1983), Ivorian footballer
- Adolphe Vorderman (1844–1902), Dutch scientist who helped toward the discovery of vitamins
- Adolphe Willette (1857–1926), French painter and architect of the Moulin Rouge

=== Adolphus ===
- Adolphus Anthony "Doc" Cheatham (1905–1997), American jazz trumpeter, singer, and bandleader
- Adolphus Busch (1839–1913), American businessman and co-founder of Anheuser-Busch
- Adolphus Ealey (1941–1992), American curator and educator
- Adolphus L. Fitzgerald (1840–1921), Justice of the Supreme Court of Nevada
- Adolphus W. Green (1844–1917), American businessman and founder of Nabisco
- Adolphus Washington Greely (1844–1935), American polar explorer
- Adolphus Grimes (1913–1998), American baseball player
- Adolphus F. Hitchcock (1803–1888), American farmer and politician
- Adolphus Jones (born 1984), Kittian and Nevisian track and field athlete and footballer
- Adolphus Warburton Moore (1841–1887), British civil servant and mountaineer
- Adolphus Ofodile (born 1979), Nigerian footballer
- Adolphus Busch Orthwein (1917–2013), American heir and business executive and formerly missing person
- Adolphus Jean Sweet (1920–1985), American actor
- Adolphus Washington (born 1994), American football player

== People with the surname in any variant ==
=== Adolf ===
- Balázs Adolf (born 1999), Hungarian canoeist
- Helen Adolf (1895–1998), Austrian–American linguist and literature scholar
- Josef Adolf (1898–1951), Czechoslovak Nordic combined skier
- Karel Josef Adolf (1715–1771), Czech painter
- Nina Avgustinovna Adolf (1903–1951), Russian botanist
- Rudy Adolf, Austrian-American businessman

=== Adolph ===
- Bill Adolph (born 1949), American accountant and politician
- Dave Adolph (1937–2017), American football coach
- José Adolph (1933–2008), Peruvian author
- Karen Adolph, American Psychologist
- Renate Adolph (born 1954), German politician
- Victoria Codona Adolph (1891–1983), Mexican circus performer
- Walter Adolph (1913–1941), German World War II fighter pilot

=== Adolphe ===
- Bruce Adolphe (born 1955), American classical composer
- Curron J. Adolphe (fl. 1868–1872), American politician
- Ethel Sawyer Adolphe (born 1961), African-American civil rights activist and sociology professor
- Julia Adolphe (born 1988), American classical composer
- Monique Adolphe (1932–2022), French cell biologist
- Timothée Adolphe (born 1989), French Paralympic sprinter

=== Adolphus ===
- John Adolphus (1768–1845), English historian
- John Leycester Adolphus (1795–1862), English lawyer, jurist and author
- Milton Adolphus (1913–1988), American pianist and composer

== Fictional characters ==
- Adolphus, a character in The Adventures of Baron Munchausen
- Adolphus, a character in The Adventures of Huck Finn
- Adolphus Cusins, a character in Major Barbara by George Bernard Shaw
- Adolphus Tips, the eponymous cat of The Amazing Story of Adolphus Tips by Michael Morpurgo
- Adolf Kamil and Adolf Kaufmann, title characters of the manga Adolf by Osamu Tezuka
- Adolf Verloc, a character in Joseph Conrad's The Secret Agent
- Adolphe Pescarolo, principal of Shuchiin Academy in Kaguya-sama: Love Is War
- Adolfo Pirelli, a minor antagonist in Sweeney Todd: The Demon Barber of Fleet Street
- Adolf Stroud, a character in The Ancient Magus' Bride

== See also ==
- Æthelwulf (disambiguation)
- Athaulf
- Adolff
- Adolphine, the female equivalent of the name Adolf
- Dolf (disambiguation)
- Dolph (disambiguation)
- Ludolph
- Rudolph
- Adolfas
- Ādolfs
- Udolphus
