= Nassau =

Nassau may refer to:

== Places ==
=== Austria ===
- Nassau (Groß Sankt Florian), incorporated village of Groß Sankt Florian

=== Bahamas ===
- Nassau, The Bahamas, capital city of the Bahamas

=== Canada ===
- Nassau District, renamed Home District, regional division in Upper Canada from 1788 to 1792
- Nassau Street (Winnipeg), Manitoba
- Nassau Street, Toronto

=== Cook Islands ===
- Nassau (Cook Islands), one of the Northern Cook Islands

=== Germany ===
==== Connected with Nassau, Rhineland-Palatinate ====
- Nassau (region), the broader geographical and historical region comprising the historical Nassau realms
- Nassau, Rhineland-Palatinate, a town
- Bad Ems-Nassau, a collective municipality
- Nassau Castle, the ancestral seat of the House of Nassau
- Nassau Nature Park, a major nature park in Germany located within the historical state of Nassau
- County of Nassau, a German state within the Holy Roman Empire existing from 1159 until 1806.
- Duchy of Nassau, a German state existing from 1806 until 1866 and created after the promotion from county to ducal status
- Hesse-Nassau, a Prussian province formed following their annexation of the Duchy of Nassau (along with other territories)
- Province of Nassau, a province of Nazi Germany (1944–1945)

==== Saxony ====
- Nassau, Saxony, an incorporated village of Frauenstein, Saxony

=== Indonesia ===
- Nassau, a subdistrict in Toba Regency, North Sumatra
- Nassau Range, alternate name of the Sudirman Range in Indonesia

=== Ireland ===
- Nassau Street, Dublin

=== Jamaica ===
- Nassau Valley

=== Netherlands ===
- Baarle-Nassau, a town in the southern Netherlands

=== Poland ===
- Mokra, Opole Voivodeship (German: Mokrau, named Nassau O.S. 1936–1945)

=== Slovenia ===
- Nasova (formerly German: Nassau in der Steiermark)

=== Taiwan ===
- historic name for Taitung City

=== United States ===
- Nassau, Delaware
- Nassau County, Florida
- Nassau Village-Ratliff, Florida
- Nassau, Minnesota
- Nassau, New York (disambiguation)
- East Nassau, New York
- Nassau (town), New York, in Rensselaer County
- Nassau (village), New York
- Nassau County, New York, on Long Island
- Nassau Island, former name of Long Island
- Nassau Lake in Rensselaer County
- Nassau Lake, New York, corresponding census-designated place
- Nassau Street (Manhattan), New York City
- Nassau Street (Princeton, New Jersey)
- Nassau Bay, Texas

== People ==
=== Nobles ===
- House of Nassau, a European aristocratic dynasty
- House of Orange-Nassau, a noble dynasty from the Netherlands
- Louis of Nassau (1538–1574), Dutch general
- Maurice of Nassau, Prince of Orange (1567–1625), Dutch stadtholder
- Sophia of Nassau (1836–1913), Queen consort of Sweden and Norway
- William Nassau de Zuylestein, 4th Earl of Rochford (1717–1781), British courtier, diplomat, and statesman
- House of Nassau-Siegen
- John Maurice of Nassau (1604–1679), Dutch colonial governor
- House of Nassau-Weilburg, a noble dynasty from Germany, monarchs of Luxembourg
- Adolf of Nassau (disambiguation)
- Adolph of Nassau-Weilburg (disambiguation)
- Maria of Nassau (disambiguation)
- William of Nassau (disambiguation)

=== Surname ===
- Charles William Nassau (1804–1878), Presbyterian minister, president of Lafayette College

=== Given name ===
- Nassau William Senior (1790–1864), English lawyer and economist

== Ships ==
- HMS Nassau, a UK Royal Navy name for many ships
- HNLMS Johan Maurits van Nassau, ships of the Netherlands navy
- MV Queen of Nassau, name of HMCS Canada after leaving government service
- Nassau-class battleship, an Imperial German battleship class
- SMS Nassau, a 1908 German battleship
- SS Nassau, a steam turbine-driven twin-screw passenger-and-cargo ocean liner, launched in 1928
- USS Nassau, a U.S. Navy ship name for several ships

== Other uses ==
- Nassau (album), a 1995 album by The Sea and Cake
- Nassau (bet), a type of bet between golfers
- Nassau (crater), a lunar impact crater on the far side of the Moon
- Nassau (Staten Island Railway station), United States
- Nassau Club, a private club in Princeton, New Jersey, founded by Woodrow Wilson
- Nassau Coliseum, an arena in Uniondale, New York, United States
- Nassau Fjord, in Prince William Sound, Alaska
- Nassau grouper, an endangered species of fish
- Nassau Hall, Princeton University, New Jersey, United States
- Nassau Light Railway, a German railway company
- "Nassau", a song by Shakira from Las Mujeres Ya No Lloran, 2024

== See also ==
- Battle of Nassau (disambiguation)
- Fort Nassau (disambiguation)
- Nassau County (disambiguation)
- Nassau Street (disambiguation)
- Nassau Village (disambiguation)
- Orange-Nassau (disambiguation)
