= Adolf (disambiguation) =

Adolf is a male given name.

Adolf may also refer to:

- Adolf Hitler, leader of Nazi Germany
- Adolf (manga), a manga by Osamu Tezuka
- Adolph (drama), a play by Pip Utton
- Adolf Gun, a World War II artillery piece
- Adolf Fredriks kyrka, a church in Stockholm, Sweden
- Adolfo Suárez Madrid–Barajas Airport in Spain

== See also ==
- Adolff
- Adolfo (disambiguation)
- Adolphe (disambiguation)
