= Adolphe (disambiguation) =

Adolphe is a French novel by Benjamin Constant, published in 1816.

Adolphe may also refer to:

- Adolphe (given name), an alternative spelling of the given name Adolf
- Adolphe, Grand Duke of Luxembourg (1817–1905), monarch of Luxembourg
- Adolphe (film), a 2002 film based on the novel
- Adolphe (ship), a ship wrecked near the mouth of the Hunter River in New South Wales, Australia in 1904
- Operation Adolphe, a French military operation of the First Indochina War

== People with the surname ==
- Bruce Adolphe (born 1955), American composer and music scholar
- Curron J. Adolphe, American politician
- Monique Adolphe (born 1932), French scientist

== See also ==
- St. Adolphe, Manitoba, a community in Manitoba, Canada
