= Aatu =

Aatu is a Finnish masculine given name and a variant of the Germanic name Adolf. It gained popularity in the 19th century during the Finnicization of given names. Other Finnish variants of Adolf include Atte and Aadolf. In the Finnish Almanac, the name day for Aatu, Aatto and Aadolf is July 23.

== People with the given name ==
- Aatu Hakala (born 2000), Finnish footballer
- Aatu Halme (1873–1933), Finnish construction worker, trade union functionary and politician
- Aatu Hämäläinen (born 1987), Finnish ice hockey player
- Aatu Kivimäki (born 1997), Finnish basketball player
- Aatu Kujanpää (born 1998), Finnish footballer
- Aatu Laatikainen (born 1997), Finnish footballer
- Aatu Manninen (born 1996), Finnish footballer
- Aatu Räty (born 2002), Finnish ice hockey player
