= Ādolfs =

Latvian masculine given name

- Gender: Male
- Language: Latvian
- Name day: 27 September (Latvia)

Origin
- Region of origin: Latvia

Ādolfs is a Latvian masculine given name, a variant of Adolf, and may refer to:

- Ādolfs Alunāns (1848–1912), Latvian playwright, director and actor
- Ādolfs Bļodnieks (1889–1962), Latvian politician, former Prime Minister of Latvia
- Ādolfs Greble (1902–1943), Latvian footballer
- Ādolfs Petrovskis (1912–1972), Latvian ice hockey player
- Ādolfs Sīmanis (1909–1979), Latvian footballer
- Ādolfs Skulte (1909–2000), Latvian composer and pedagogue
