= Nassau Street =

Nassau Street may refer to:

- Nassau Street, Dublin, Ireland
- Nassau Street (Manhattan), New York City, US
- Nassau Street (Princeton, New Jersey), US
- Nassau Street (Winnipeg), Manitoba, Canada

== See also ==
- Nassau Avenue (IND Crosstown Line), New York subway station
- Nassau (disambiguation)
