= Nassau Village =

Nassau Village may refer to:

- Nassau Village (Bahamas Parliament constituency)
- Nassau (village), New York
- Nassau Village-Ratliff, Florida

== See also ==
- Nassau
