= Adolph of Nassau-Weilburg =

Adolph or Adolph of Nassau-Weilburg may refer to:

- Adolf, King of Germany (c. 1255–1298), King of the Romans
- Adolphe, Grand Duke of Luxembourg (1817–1905), last sovereign Duke of Nassau

== See also ==
- Adolf of Nassau (disambiguation)
- Adolf (disambiguation)
- Nassau (disambiguation)
