= Atte =

Atte may refer to the following people:

== Finnish given name ==
- Atte Engren (born 1988), Finnish ice hockey goaltender
- Atte Hoivala (born 1992), Finnish football player
- Atte Mäkinen (born 1995), Finnish ice hockey defenceman
- Atte Muhonen (1888–1954), Finnish farmer and politician
- Atte Mustonen (born 1988), Finnish motor racing driver
- Atte Ohtamaa (born 1987), Finnish ice hockey defenceman
- Atte Pentikäinen (born 1982), Finnish ice hockey defenseman
- Atte Toikka (1997–2019), Finnish musician
- Atte Perttu (born 1990), Finnish basketball player

== African surname ==
- Ismaila Atte-Oudeyi (born 1985), Togolese football player
- Zanzan Atte-Oudeyi (born 1980), Togolese football player
