= Adolf of Nassau =

Adolf of Nassau may refer to:

- Adolf, King of Germany (c. 1255–1298), King of the Romans
- Adolph I, Count of Nassau-Wiesbaden-Idstein (1307–1370)
- Adolf I (archbishop of Mainz) (c. 1353–1390), of the House of Nassau-Wiesbaden-Idstein
- Adolf I, Count of Nassau-Siegen (1362–1420)
- Adolph II, Count of Nassau-Wiesbaden-Idstein (1386–1426)
- Adolf II (archbishop of Mainz) (1423–1475), of the House of Nassau-Wiesbaden-Idstein
- Adolph III, Count of Nassau-Wiesbaden-Idstein (1443–1511)
- Adolph IV, Count of Nassau-Wiesbaden-Idstein (1518–1556)
- Adolph, Count of Nassau-Saarbrücken (1526–1559)
- Adolf of Nassau (1540–1568), brother of Louis of Nassau and William I of Orange, killed in the Battle of Heiligerlee
- Adolf of Nassau-Siegen (1586–1608), son of Count John VII
- Adolph, Prince of Nassau-Schaumburg (1629–1676), son of Louis Henry of Nassau-Dillenburg
- Adolph, Count of Ottweiler (1789–1812)
- Adolphe, Grand Duke of Luxembourg (1817–1905), Duke of Nassau and later Grand Duke of Luxembourg

== See also ==
- Adolph of Nassau-Weilburg (disambiguation)
- Adolf (disambiguation)
- Nassau (disambiguation)
