= Udolpho =

Udolpho may refer to:

- the fictional location in The Mysteries of Udolpho, a 1794 novel
- Udolpho Township, Mower County, Minnesota

== See also ==
- Udolphus, a given name
