= Saint Adolph =

Saint Adolph may refer to:

- Adolph, ninth-century Spanish martyr, brother of one of the Martyrs of Córdoba
- Adolf of Osnabrück (c. 1185–1222/1224), German martyr
- Adolphus Ludigo-Mkasa (c. 1861–1886), Ugandan martyr
