= Adolphine =

Adolphine may refer to:

- Adolphine (given name), a female name
- Methadone

== See also ==
- 608 Adolfine
