= Battle of the Bahamas =

The Battle of the Bahamas or the Battle of Nassau may refer to one of several military actions in and around the town of Nassau, on the island of New Providence in The Bahamas:

- Raid on Charles Town, a 1684 Spanish Raid
- Raid on Nassau, a 1703 Franco-Spanish raid during the War of the Spanish Succession
- Raid on Nassau (1720), a Spanish expedition against Nassau during the War of the Quadruple Alliance
- Raid of Nassau, a 1776 American raid during the American War of Independence
- Capture of the Bahamas (1782), the capture of islands by Spanish forces under Juan de Cagigal during the American War of Independence
- Capture of the Bahamas (1783), their recapture by American Loyalist forces during the American War of Independence

== See also ==
- Nassau (disambiguation)
