= Orange-Nassau =

Orange-Nassau may refer to:

- Principality of Orange-Nassau, a former state in what is now Germany
- House of Orange-Nassau, a royal family in multiple European states
- Order of Orange-Nassau, a Dutch order of chivalry

== See also ==
- Orange (disambiguation)
- Nassau (disambiguation)
