= Katoosa Martyrs Shrine =

Shrine in Kyenjonjo District, Uganda

Religion
- Affiliation: Roman Catholic Church
- District: Kyenjojo District
- Province: Western Uganda
- Ecclesiastical or organisational status: Pilgrimage site and Catholic shrine
- Leadership: Uganda Episcopal Conference
- Year consecrated: 1960s
- Status: Active

Location
- Location: Katoosa Parish, Kyenjojo District, Uganda
- Country: Uganda
- Interactive map of Katoosa Martyrs Shrine

Katoosa Martyrs Shrine (established in the 1960s) is a Ugandan Catholic martyrs shrine located in Katoosa parish in Kyenjonjo District. It is where St. Adolf Tibeyalirwa was abducted. It is also known as Katoosa Catholic Shrine, Katoosa shrine, Katoosa Parish shrine, Katoosa Martyrs villa, evil place full of rocks. It was established in the 1960s by Monsignor Francis Aquirinus Kibira (later appointed Bishop of the Roman Catholic Diocese of Kasese), under the instructions of the Uganda Episcopal Conference.

== Location and geography ==
Coordinates: 0.6321°N 30.6475°E

The Katoosa martyrs shrine is located in Katoosa Parish in Kyenjonjo district two kilometres off the Kyenjonjo-Kagadi road. The shrine has more than 30 rocks/stones of 15 feet tall leaning on each other they have names of the Uganda martyrs and the dates on the martyrs were killed written on them.

== History ==
The development of the Katoosa martyrs' shrine was initiated by the late Fr. Fortunate Kasangaki (its first parish priest) and the curate, Messenger Kaijanabyo. It was established in the 1960s by Monsignor Francis Kibira under the instructions of the Uganda Episcopal Conference who later passed on the work to Monsignor Hilarious Kaijanabyo due to his old age.

Messenger Hilarious Kaijanabyo purchased the land from the traditionalists who were using the land for traditional rituals such as offering of sacrifices and he asked the traditionalists to vacate the place.

The Uganda catholic church consecrated the land, and the rocks were inscribed with the names of the Uganda martyrs, how they were killed, the age they were killed at, where they were killed from, their respective spiritual duties, and also painted with the portraits of the Uganda martyrs. Other inscriptions and paintings on the rocks include; Jesus' tomb, Bethlehem, Mwanga's seat among other words.

== Site construction and development ==
In 2024, Tom Butime Ugada's Minister for Tourism Wildlife and Antiquities, mentioned that the government of Uganda was allocating USh1.5 billion in the financial year of 2024/2025 that would be used in the construction of the perimeter wall around the Katoosa Martyrs Shrine, a canteen, accommodation facilities and water tanks.

== Annual celebrations for St. Adolf Tibeyalirwa ==
On 27 January of every year, an annual celebration for St. Adolf Tibeyalirwa is held at the Katoosa Catholic Shrine, which is located in Katoosa Parish in Kyenjonjo district. Five catholic dioceses participate in the organisation of this annual celebration and these include; Mbarara diocese, Fort portal diocese, Kabale diocese, Hoima diocese and kasese diocese. In April 2023, the bishops from Mbarara province initiated annual provincial celebrations to honour St. Adolf Tibeyariwa.

On 27 November each year, Catholic pilgrims from Tanzania and Rwanda trek to the Katoosa Martyrs Shrine to pray. The annual celebration was not held in 2021 and also in 2022 due to COVID-19.

This annual celebration was attended by more than 80,000 pilgrims in 2023 from various districts in Uganda and also from Democratic Republic of the Congo. The pilgrims also trek every year to the Katoosa shrine to attend prayers to honour St, Adolf Tibeyalirwa.

In 2024, the security personnel issued a directive that stopped pilgrims from moving at night at the Katoosa Shrine due to the security threats that were caused by Allied Democratic Forces (ADF). The pilgrims were also required to move with their identification documents.

== Myths and legends ==
In the early marriage traditions in Tooro Kingdom, the brides were always moved at night to the groom's home. One night when both the groom and the bride were passing near Katoosa rocks, the bride ran and entered into the rocks and it is believed that she was swallowed by one of the rocks and she was never seen again.

== See also ==
- The Uganda Martyrs
- Namugongo
- White Father mission in Uganda
