= Nassau, New York (disambiguation) =

Nassau, New York, is a town in Rensselaer County.

Nassau is also the name of other places in the state of New York and may refer to:

- Nassau (village), New York
- Nassau County, New York
- Nassau Island, former name of Long Island

== See also ==
- Nassau (disambiguation)
