= Dolf =

Dolf is a Dutch masculine given name, often a short form (hypocorism) of Adolf, which may refer to:

- Dolf Brouwers (1912–1997), Dutch comedian, singer and television actor
- Dolf de Vries (1937–2020), Dutch actor
- Dolf Jansen (born 1963), comedian, presenter of the Radio 2 program Spijkers met Koppen
- Dolf Joekes (1884–1962), Dutch politician
- Dolf Kessler (1884–1945), Dutch football player and industrialist
- Dolf van Kol (1902–1989), Dutch footballer
- Dolf van der Linden (1915–1999), Dutch conductor of popular music
- Dolf Luque (1890–1957), Cuban Major League Baseball pitcher
- Dölf Mettler (1934–2015), Swiss yodeler, composer and painter
- Dolf van der Nagel (1889–1949), Dutch amateur footballer
- Dolf Rieser (1898–1983), South African-born British painter, printmaker and teacher
- Dolf Roks (born 1962), former amateur footballer from The Netherlands
- Dolf Sternberger (1907–1989), German philosopher and political scientist at the University of Heidelberg
- Dolf Verroen (born 1928), Dutch writer of children's literature
- Dolf van der Voort van Zijp (1892–1978), Dutch horse rider
- Dölf Wild (born 1954), Swiss historian and archaeologist
- Dolf Wyllarde (1871–1950), English writer

== See also ==
- Dolph (disambiguation)
- Piz Dolf, a mountain of the Glarus Alps, on the border between the cantons of St. Gallen and Graubünden
