= Ezio Vigorelli =

Italian politician (1892–1964)

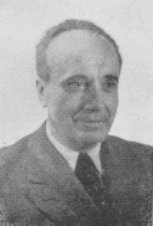

Minister of Labour and Social Welfare
- In office 1954–1959
- Prime Minister: Mario Scelba; Antonio Segni; Amintore Fanfani

Personal details
- Born: 17 August 1892 Lecco, Lombardy, Kingdom of Italy
- Died: 24 October 1964 (aged 72) Milan, Italy
- Party: PSI (1921–1947; 1959–1964); PSDI (1947–1959)
- Spouse: Diana Fugazza
- Children: 2

Ezio Vigorelli (17 August 1892 – 24 October 1964) was an Italian lawyer and politician who was a member of the Italian Socialist Party (PSI) and then of the Italian Democratic Socialist Party (PSDI). He served as the minister of labour and social welfare in three different cabinets in the period 1954–1959.

== Early life and education ==
Vigorelli was born in Lecco on 17 August 1892. He participated in the Italian army and participated in Libyan War and World War I. He was wounded in the war which made him disabled. After the war he received a law degree.

== Career ==
Vigorelli started his career as a lawyer in Milan. In 1921 he joined the PSI. From 1921 to 1926 he was the city councillor in Milan for the party. In 1943 he took refuge in Switzerland with his family due to the oppression of the Fascist rule.

In 1944 Vigorelli was part of the Ossola uprising and served as the minister of the provisional government. Next year he was named the president of the municipal assistance agency in Milan which he held until 1957. One of his first initiatives in this post was the campaign against poverty.

Vigorelli became a member of the Constituent Assembly in 1947 and joined the PSDI. Vigorelli became one of the leading figures of the party. He was also elected to the Parliament in 1948. In the 1950s Roberto Tremelloni and Vigorelli led the parliament's inquiry committee on the problems of poverty and unemployment.

Vigorelli was appointed minister of labour and social welfare in 1954 to the cabinet of Prime Minister Mario Scelba. Roberto Tremelloni and Vigorelli were the social democrat members of the cabinet. Vigorelli continued to serve in the post in the first cabinet of Antonio Segni until 1957. He was also named as the minister of labour and social welfare in the cabinet led by Prime Minister Amintore Fanfani in July 1958. Vigorelli resigned from the office on 24 January 1959. On 8 February 1959 he and other deputies left the PSDI and established a group which joined the PSI on 18 May 1959.

== Personal life and death ==
Vigorelli married Diana Fugazza, and they had two children, Bruno and Adolfo, who were born in 1920 and 1921, respectively. In June 1944 both of his sons died in the liberation war against the Fascist regime. Vigorelli died in Milan on 24 October 1964.

=== Work ===
Vigorelli published a book entitled L'italiano e socialista e non lo sa (Italian: The Italian is a Socialist and does not Know It) in 1952.

| Preceded by Giuseppe Saragat | Secretary of the Italian Democratic Socialist Party; 1952 | Succeeded by Giuseppe Romita |
