= Adolfas =

- Gender: Male

Origin
- Origin: Adolf
- Meaning: Noble wolf
- Region of origin: Lithuania

Adolfas is a masculine Lithuanian given name, derived from the German Adolf meaning "noble". Notable people with the name include:

- Adolfas Akelaitis (1910–2007), Lithuanian high jumper
- Adolfas Aleksejūnas (born 1937), Lithuanian middle-distance runner
- Adolfas Jucys (1904–1974), Lithuanian theoretical physicist and mathematician
- Adolfas Mekas (1925–2011), Lithuanian film director, and brother of Jonas Mekas
- Adolfas Ramanauskas (1918–1957), American-born Lithuanian anti-Soviet partisan
- Adolfas Šleževičius (1948–2022), former Prime Minister of Lithuania
- Adolfas Tautavičius (born 1925), Lithuanian archaeologist and Habilitated Doctor
- Adolfas Urbšas (1900–1973), Lithuanian and Soviet military officer
- Adolfas Valeška (1905–1994), Lithuanian stained glass artist, painter, stage designer, and museum director
- Adolfas Varanauskas (1934–2007), Lithuanian shot putter
- Adolfas Večerskis (born 1949), Lithuanian movie and stage actor, director and translator

== See also ==
- Adolf
