= Adolfo =

Adolfo may refer to:

- Adolfo, São Paulo, a Brazilian municipality
- Adolfo (designer), Cuban-born American fashion designer
- Adolfo (film), a 2023 comedy drama film
- Adolfo (given name), a list of people with the name
