= Nassau County =

Nassau County may refer to:

- Nassau County, Florida, part of the Jacksonville metro area
- Nassau County, New York, part of Long Island in the New York City metro area
- County of Nassau, a former county and state of the Holy Roman Empire ruled by the Counts of Nassau, in modern Germany

== See also ==
- Nassau (disambiguation)
