= Adolphine (given name) =

Adolphine is a female given name, the female equivalent of Adolf. People with the name include:

- Adolphine Fletcher Terry (1882–1976), American political and social activist
- Adolphine Kok (1879–1928), Dutch lawyer
- Adolphine Muley (born 1970), Congolese Twa politician and activist

== See also ==
- Marie-Adolphine (1866–1900), Dutch nun and Martyr Saint of China
