= Adolf Hempt =

Serbian biologist (1874–1943)

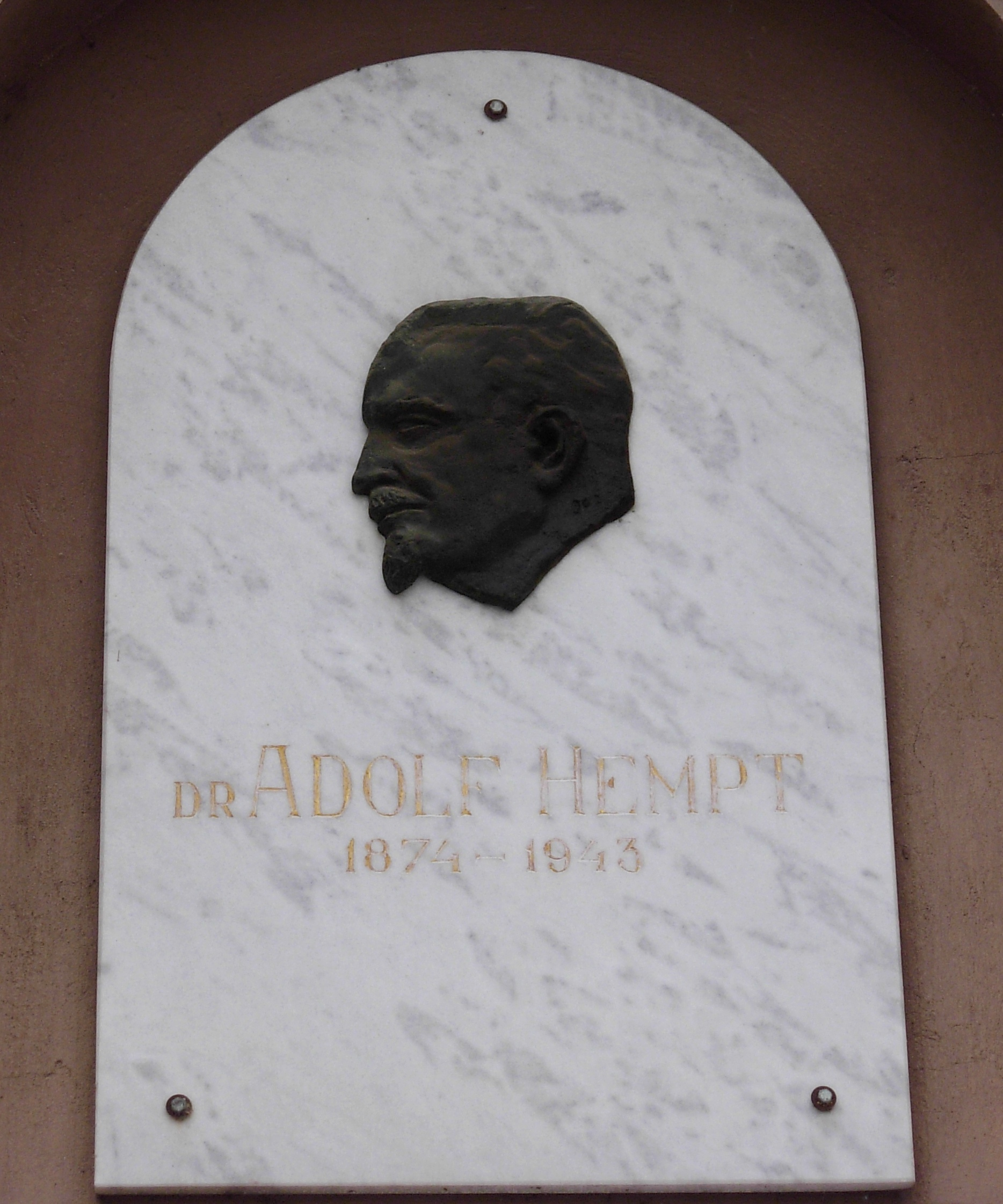
- Adolf Hempt plaque
- Born: 21 September, 1874; Novi Sad
- Died: 1943; Novi Sad
- Resting place: Old Protestant graveyard
- Scientific career
- Fields: Biology

Adolf Hempt (1874–1943) was a Serbian biologist and the founder of the Pasteur Institute in Novi Sad, Serbia. He stabilized Pasteur's vaccine against rabies so that it could be distributed to distant places. His method of producing vaccines were used in all Central European countries, and a vaccine against rabies was produced according to his technology until 1989.

== Biography ==
Hempt was born on September 21, 1874, in Novi Sad (then under the Austro-Hungarian monarchy) as son of a Belgian Protestant missionary and Katarina Tewely, originally from Budapest. The family soon moved to Sarajevo where he finished his primary studies. As the family was not wealthy enough to pay for his studies, he started studying medicine in Graz and Munich as military medic. Henry earned his medical diploma on the University of Graz in 1898. As an aspiring medic, he started working in the same year in Vienna in the First Garrison Hospital. After that, he was moved to a cavalry garrison next to Vienna. During this, he married Maria Winkler in 1903. His first son was also born here in 1904. After demobilization, they moved to Lukavac, where ha worked as a doctor. In Bosnia, he gained experience in trying to heal different diseases including rabies. In that time, Pasteur Institutes were established in Belgrade, Budapest and Niš, but most of the people were not traveling to these cities, and the existing vaccination was not transportable. During World War I, he was a commander of a hospital in Trieste. After that, he worked in Bosnia; in 1921, he returned to Novi Sad, accepting the invitation of the Serbian Minister of Health Andrija Štampar. Here, he founded a Pasteur Institute and became the first director of the same. The institute was producing Pasteur's vaccine against rabies, and provided information to the people about prevention.

Hempt published his modifications to the vaccine against rabies in 1925, which was accepted on a medical conference in Paris in 1927. After that, the vaccine was produced according to his technology all around Europe. This so-called inactive or "dead vaccines" were produced in Europe to the end of 1980s, and are still used in India and some developing countries.

He died in 1943 in Novi Sad, where he is buried in the old Protestant graveyard. A memorial tablet in his memory was erected in the Pasteur Institute in his remembrance. For his work he was rewarded with the medal of St Sava. Since 2002, the street where his family house was is named after him, Dr. Hempt Street.

== Contribution to medicine ==
Hempt's vaccine against rabies was the successor of Pasteur's. Its longer lasting ability helped in the transportation over distances, saving many lives of humans and animals. The vaccine was produced all over Europe from 1925 to the end of the 1980s, when it was replaced by modern tissue based vaccines. After creation of the new vaccine based on duck embryo, the Tropical Institute in Hamburg proved Hempt's vaccine still to be better, in regards of local and general reactions and number of antibodies. Dr. Imre Lentai on the symposium about rabies in 2001 in Novi Sad presented the fact, that no person vaccinated in Hungary with Hempt's vaccine was diagnosed with rabies. The vaccine was developed in Novi Sad in the beginning of the 1920s. He handled the invention as public knowledge from the beginning. Dr. Hempt took major part in publishing and education to prevent spreading of the disease.

After the formulation of the vaccine, he was in Paris. In 1925, he published the results in one of the most known medical journals, the Analima. According to this method the vaccination took only 6 days instead of 14–21 days of the existing methods. The other advantage was that this vaccination contained only dead viruses with sustained immunogens. Because of this, the vaccine was safe and able to be transported in glass ampules, and was also easy to use. Pasteur Institutes before that were preparing fresh vaccines, and customizing them to each patient.
