= Ādolfs Petrovskis =

Latvian ice hockey player

- Born: 7 April 1912
- Died: 14 October 1974 (aged 62) Milwaukee, Wisconsin, United States
- Position: Centre
- Played for: Rīgas US; HK ASK Rīga
- National team: Latvia
- Playing career: 1931–1938

Ādolfs Petrovskis (7 April 1912 – 14 October 1974) was a Latvian ice hockey player. He played for Rīgas US and HK ASK Rīga during his career. Petersons also played for the Latvian national team at the 1936 Winter Olympics and two World Championships.
