= William of Nassau =

William of Nassau may refer to:

- William I, Count of Nassau-Siegen (1487–1559), William the Rich
- William the Silent, count of Nassau (1533–1584); later Willem of Orange
  - Alternative title for Het Wilhelmus, the Dutch national anthem (named after the above)
- William of Nassau (1601–1627), grandson of the above
- William of Nassau (1620–1679), son of the above
- William, Count of Nassau-Siegen (1592–1642)
- William of Nassau-Weilburg (1792–1839), duke of Nassau
- William I of the Netherlands (1772–1843), Count of Nassau (1840-1843), Prince of Nassau-Orange-Fulda, Prince of Orange-Nassau
