= Ādolfs Greble =

Latvian footballer (1902–1943)

Personal information
- Date of birth: 10 October 1902
- Place of birth: Riga, Latvia
- Date of death: 30 March 1943 (aged 40)
- Place of death: Vyatlag prison camp, Russia

International career
Years	Team	Apps	(Gls)
1923–1929	Latvia	7	(0)

Ādolfs August Greble (10 October 1902 – 30 March 1943) was a Latvian footballer.

== Football career ==
He played in seven matches for the Latvia national football team from 1923 to 1929. He was also part of Latvia's squad for the football tournament at the 1924 Summer Olympics, but he did not play in any matches.

Greble played in club level for LSB in 1922–24 and 1926-29 and JKS in 1925. During the 1930s he officiated as a referee and in 1940 returned to LSB as its coach.

== Personal life and death ==
Greble was born in Riga, Latvia, son of Johann Greble and his wife Auguste (nee Zalcmane). He studied at the University of Latvia in Engineering, Mathematics and Agriculture, with an interval of compulsory military service in the Latvian Army heavy artillery in 1925–26. He became a journalist, first editor of the sports journal Sporta pasule in 1931–34. In 1934 he was briefly detained as a member of the board of the banned fascist Perkonkrusts (Thunder Cross) movement following the coup of Karlis Ulmanis.

Following the Soviet annexation of Latvia in 1940, Greble was arrested by the Soviet authorities and after being deemed "socially dangerous" was deported into Russia in October 1941 after being sentenced to imprisonment in the Gulag. He died in Vyatlag prison camp, Russia in March 1943.
