= Aatu Manninen =

Finnish footballer (born 1996)

Personal information
- Date of birth: 9 June 1996 (age 30)
- Place of birth: Jyväskylä, Finland
- Height: 1.73 m (5 ft 8 in)
- Position: Central midfielder

Team information
- Current team: JJK
- Number: 16

Youth career
- –2016: JJK

Senior career*
Years	Team	Apps	(Gls)
2016–2018	JJK II/Villiketut	18	(0)
2017–2019	JJK	50	(2)
2019–2021	MP	53	(8)
2022–	JJK	68	(6)
- * Club domestic league appearances and goals as of 20 October 2024

Aatu Manninen (born 9 June 1996) is a Finnish professional footballer who plays as a central midfielder for Ykkönen club JJK Jyväskylä.

== Club career ==
Manninen debuted in top-tier Veikkausliiga with JJK first team in the 2017 season.

On 21 August 2019, Manninen moved to Mikkeli and signed with Mikkelin Palloilijat (MP). His deal with MP was extended on 2 December 2019.

Manninen returned to his former club JJK for the 2022 season. On 11 November 2023, his contract extension was announced.
