= Atte Pentikäinen =

Finnish ice hockey player

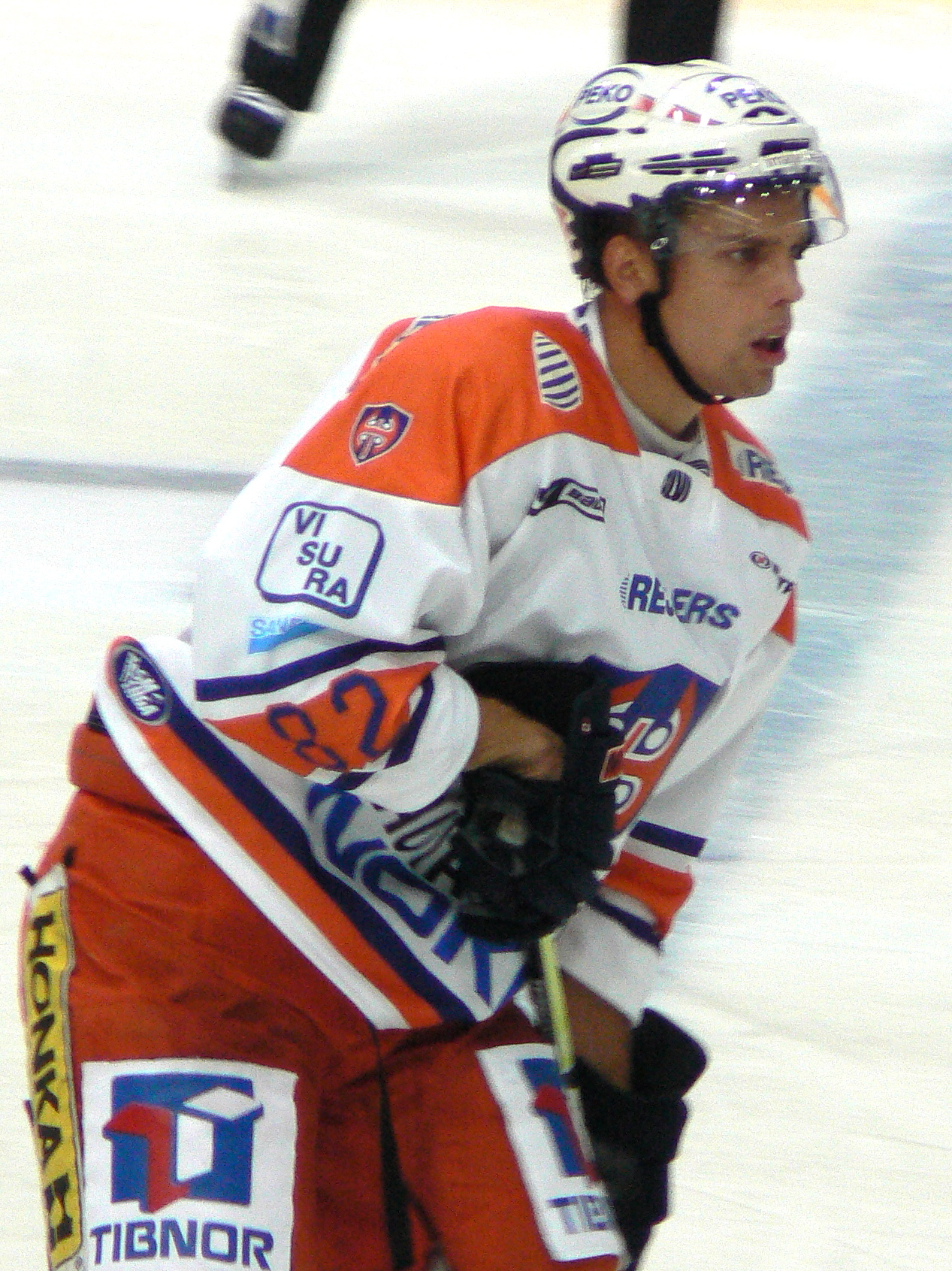
- Born: 12 December 1982 (age 42) Juupajoki, Finland
- Height: 6 ft 6 in (198 cm)
- Weight: 231 lb (105 kg; 16 st 7 lb)
- Position: Defence
- Shot: Left
- Played for: Tappara; Ässät Pori; Färjestad BK; Jokerit; HK Poprad; Ilves Tampere; Oulun Kärpät; Fischtown Pinguins
- NHL draft: Undrafted
- Playing career: 2003–2017

Atte Pentikäinen (born 12 December 1982) is a Finnish former professional ice hockey defenseman. He last played for the Fischtown Pinguins in the Deutsche Eishockey Liga (DEL).

He played with Ässät (2004–06) and Färjestads BK (2006–07). After spending the majority of his 13-year professional career in his native Finland, Pentikäinen agreed to a one-year contract with Austrian outfit, Graz 99ers of the EBEL on July 4, 2016. Just over two-months later, after enduring pre-season with the 99ers, Pentikainen used an opt-out clause to release him from his contract on September 8. He was signed the following day with German club, the Fischtown Pinguins of the neighboring DEL to begin the 2015–16 season.

== Career statistics ==
			Regular season					Playoffs
Season	Team	League	GP	G	A	Pts	PIM	GP	G	A	Pts	PIM
1998–99	Tappara U16	U16 SM-sarja	22	0	2	2	34	4	0	0	0	2
1999–00	Tappara U18	U18 SM-sarja	18	1	1	2	8	—	—	—	—	—
2000–01	Tappara U18	U18 SM-sarja	13	2	3	5	36	7	0	0	0	2
2000–01	Tappara U20	U20 SM-liiga	21	2	2	4	10	7	0	0	0	2
2001–02	Tappara U20	U20 SM-liiga	23	1	1	2	38	2	0	0	0	0
2002–03	Tappara U20	U20 SM-liiga	36	1	4	5	83	7	0	0	0	14
2003–04	Tappara	SM-liiga	1	0	0	0	0	—	—	—	—	—
2003–04	TUTO Hockey	Mestis	2	0	0	0	2	—	—	—	—	—
2003–04	KooKoo	Mestis	24	1	8	9	32	9	0	0	0	12
2004–05	Porin Ässät	SM-liiga	53	2	1	3	97	2	0	0	0	2
2005–06	Porin Ässät	SM-liiga	56	1	7	8	87	14	0	0	0	12
2006–07	Färjestad BK	Elitserien	44	1	0	1	60	3	0	0	0	0
2007–08	Jokerit	SM-liiga	8	0	1	1	41	—	—	—	—	—
2007–08	Tappara	SM-liiga	45	0	3	3	57	11	0	0	0	2
2008–09	Tappara	SM-liiga	57	1	3	4	64	—	—	—	—	—
2009–10	Tappara	SM-liiga	56	0	7	7	133	4	1	0	1	2
2010–11	LeKi	Mestis	8	1	0	1	6	—	—	—	—	—
2010–11	Tappara	SM-liiga	23	0	3	3	26	—	—	—	—	—
2011–12	LeKi	Mestis	11	1	1	2	16	—	—	—	—	—
2011–12	HK Poprad	Slovak	19	0	1	1	22	6	0	0	0	8
2012–13	HK Poprad	Slovak	19	1	4	5	20	—	—	—	—	—
2012–13	LeKi	Mestis	20	0	5	5	28	—	—	—	—	—
2012–13	Ilves	SM-liiga	7	0	0	0	16	—	—	—	—	—
2013–14	Ilves	Liiga	37	0	4	4	71	—	—	—	—	—
2013–14	LeKi	Mestis	2	0	0	0	4	—	—	—	—	—
2014–15	Ilves	Liiga	52	1	8	9	89	2	0	0	0	2
2015–16	Oulun Kärpät	Liiga	55	1	7	8	30	11	0	0	0	0
2016–17	Fischtown Pinguins	DEL	52	0	5	5	46	6	0	1	1	2
Liiga totals			450	6	44	50	711	51	1	0	1	28
