= Adolf von Jordans =

German ornithologist (1892–1974)

Adolf Petrus Margareta Maria Joseph Hubertus von Jordans (29 April 1892 – 23 May 1974) was a German ornithologist and director of the Museum Koenig in Bonn. He described nearly 50 bird taxa in collaboration with other ornithologists.

Von Jordans was born in Lüftelberg, Meckenheim, and came from a Rhenish noble family, the son of Karl Ferdinand von Jordans (1854–1897) and Paula, née Baroness Heereman von Zuydtwyck. In 1912 he came in contact with Alexander Koenig who supported his interest in natural history. He went to the University of Bonn and in 1914 Von Jordans wrote his dissertation on the birds of Mallorca dedicated to Koenig. He was a friend of Otto Kleinschmidt. From 1921, Von Jordans was involved in developing the collections of Koenig's private museum. When Koenig died, the collections were handled by von Jordans and he became the director of the museum from 1947. In 1951 he was also made professor at the University of Bonn. He retired in 1957 to his family estate in Morenhoven Castle.

Von Jordan married Maria von Savigny (1898–1947) in 1921 and they had three daughters.
