= Atte Hoivala =

Finnish footballer (born 1992)

Personal information
- Date of birth: 10 February 1992 (age 34)
- Place of birth: Kuopio, Finland
- Height: 1.76 m (5 ft 9 1/2 in)
- Position: Defender

Youth career
- KuPS

Senior career*
Years	Team	Apps	(Gls)
2009–2012	KuPS	65	(0)
2011	→ PK-37 (loan)	2	(0)
2012	→ SiPS (loan)	5	(2)
2013	VPS	19	(0)
2014	MYPA	21	(0)
2016–	KuPS	0	(0)
2018-19	Kurkimäen Kisa	-	(-)
2019-20	Järvenpään Palloseura	-	(-)

International career
	Finland youth	19	(0)
2010	Finland U19	7	(0)
2010–	Finland U21		
- * Club domestic league appearances and goals as of 23 October 2013

Atte Hoivala (born 10 February 1992) is a Finnish football player who last played for JaPS. He made his Veikkausliiga debut in the opening match of the 2009 season in a 0–3 defeat against the upcoming champions HJK. On 15 January 2010 he signed a three-year contract with KuPS. He has visited PSV Eindhoven's trial camp twice.

He has made in total of 26 appearances for Finland's youth national teams and was selected by Markku Kanerva to represent Finland U21 in friendly against Luxembourg on 17 November 2010.

He is the son of Finnish volleyball coach Timo Hoivala.
