= Adolfo Vigorelli =

Italian Resistance fighter (1921–1944)

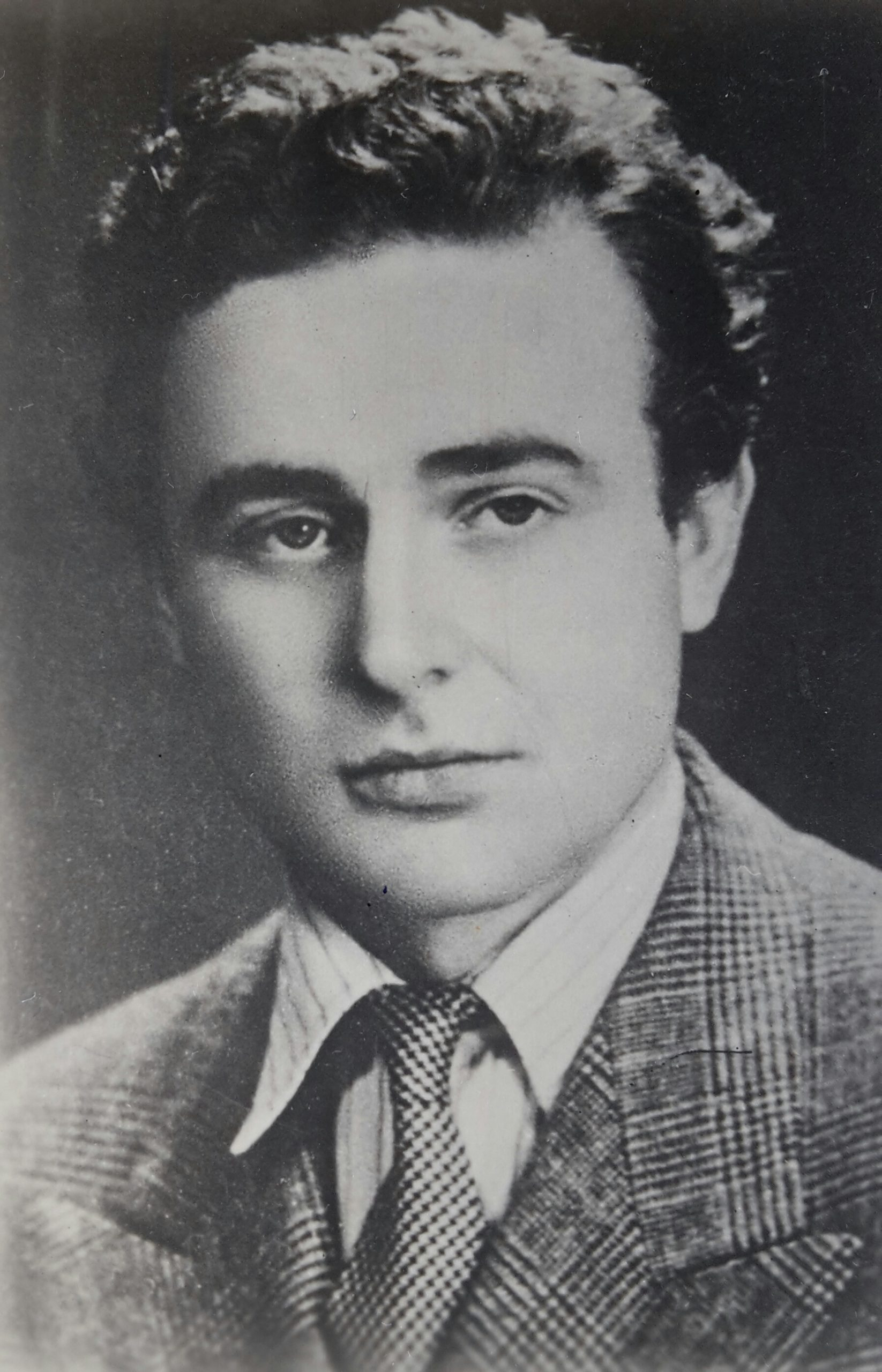
- Born: 26 October 1921; Milan, Kingdom of Italy
- Died: 22 June 1944 (aged 22); Val Grande, Italian Social Republic
- Military career
- Allegiance: Kingdom of Italy
- Branch: Royal Italian Army
- Service years: 1939-1943
- Rank: Second Lieutenant
- Conflicts: World War II; Italian Civil War
- Awards: Gold Medal of Military Valour (posthumous)

Adolfo Vigorelli (26 October 1921 – 22 June 1944) was an Italian Resistance fighter during World War II.

== Biography ==
The second son of Ezio Vigorelli, a well-known Socialist lawyer, he studied law at the Università Cattolica del Sacro Cuore in Milan, and in 1939 he enlisted as a reserve officer in the Royal Italian Army, being assigned to the Automobile Corps. During the Second World War he remained stationed in Italy, and after the Armistice of Cassibile – on 8 September 1943 he was assigned to the 3rd Automobile Regiment with the rank of second lieutenant – he evaded capture by the Germans and soon made contact with other Milanese anti-Fascists.

Hunted down by the Fascist police, he escaped to Switzerland along with his father and elder brother, Bruno, but after meeting in Lugano Dionigi Superti, commander of the "Valdossola" Partisan Division, the two brothers decided to follow him back to Italy to resume the fight against the German occupiers and the Italian Social Republic. In June 1944, during a German offensive against partisan positions in the Val Grande, Bruno died after falling into a ravine while trying to rescue a wounded partisan, and Adolfo was killed after being surrounded at Alpe Casarolo. He was posthumously awarded the Gold Medal of Military Valor.
