= Maria of Nassau =

Maria of Nassau may refer to:

- Maria of Nassau (1539–1599), daughter of William the Rich and Juliana of Stolberg
- Maria of Nassau (1553–1554), first daughter of William the Silent and Anna of Egmond
- Maria of Nassau (1556–1616), second daughter of William the Silent and Anna of Egmond
- Maria of Nassau (1568–1625), daughter of John VI, Count of Nassau-Dillenburg and Elisabeth of Leuchtenberg
- Maria of Nassau (1642–1688), daughter of Frederick Henry, Prince of Orange and Amalia of Solms-Braunfels
