= Adolphine Kok =

Dutch lawyer

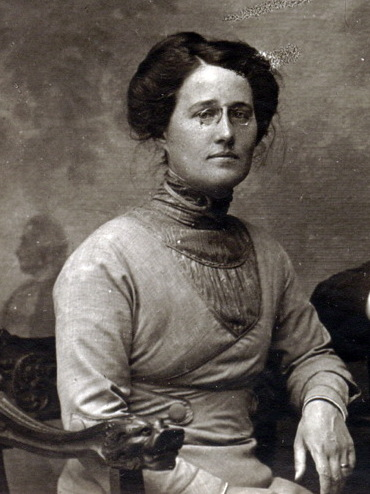
Adolphine Kok

Adolphine Eduardina Kok (August 2, 1879, in Rotterdam – August 20, 1928, in Rotterdam) was a Dutch lawyer. She became the first female lawyer in the Netherlands in 1903.

The specialty of Kok was marriage law, later she broadened her field of work, for several years having a seat in the Guardianship Council of Rotterdam, and in 1922 she wrote a preliminary recommendation on the modernization of matrimonial property law concerning marriages in the community of goods for the Brotherhood of Candidate Notaries.
