= Adolf Zeising =

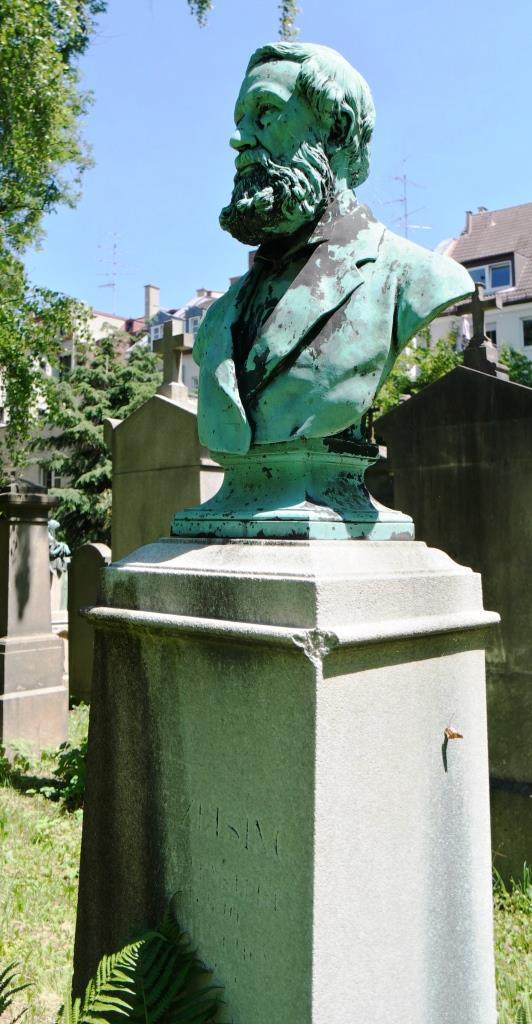
- Born: 24 September 1810; Ballenstedt, Anhalt-Bernburg, Confederation of the Rhine
- Died: 27 April 1876 (aged 65); Munich, Kingdom of Bavaria, German Empire
- Occupation: Psychologist

Adolf Zeising (24 September 1810 – 27 April 1876) was a German psychologist, whose main interests were mathematics and philosophy.

Among his theories, Zeising claimed to have found the golden ratio expressed in the arrangement of branches along the stems of plants and of veins in leaves. He extended his research to the skeletons of animals and the branchings of their veins and nerves, to the proportions of chemical compounds and the geometry of crystals, even to the use of proportion in artistic endeavors. In these phenomena he saw the golden ratio operating as a universal law,

the universal law in which is contained the ground-principle of all formative striving for beauty and completeness in the realms of both nature and art, and which permeates, as a paramount spiritual ideal, all structures, forms and proportions, whether cosmic or individual, organic or inorganic, acoustic or optical; which finds its fullest realization, however, in the human form.

Many of his studies were followed by Gustav Fechner and Le Corbusier, who elaborated his studies of human proportion to develop the Modulor.

== Works ==
- Zeitgedichte (1846)
- Neue Lehre von den Proportionen des menschlichen Körpers (1854)
- Ästhetische Forschungen (1855)
- Die Verhältnisse der Menschengestalt und der Blattstellung in ihrer Gleichheit und Verschiedenheit. (1855)
- Der menschliche Kopf im Profil (1856)
- Die Proportionen von reinen antiken Statuen (1856).
- Über die Metamorphosen in den Verhältnissen der menschlichen Gestalt von der Geburt bis zur Vollendung des Längenwachtums (1858)
- Kaiserin Eudoxia (1861)
- Hausse und Baisse (1864)
- Kunst und Gunst (1865)
- Joppe und Krinoline (1865)
- Die Verhältnisse des Kölner Doms (1869)
- Die regulären Polyeder (1869)
- Religion und Wissenschaft, Staat und Kirche (1873)
