= Dolph =

Dolph may refer to:

== People ==
=== Given name or nickname ===
- Dolph Briscoe (1923–2010), Governor of Texas from 1973 to 1979
- Dolph Camilli (1907–1997), American Major League Baseball player
- Dolph Eckstein (1902–1963), American football player
- Dolph Heinrichs (1883–1967), Australian rules footballer
- Dolph Lundgren (born 1957), Swedish actor
- Dolph Pulliam (born 1946), American former basketball player and television sportscaster
- Dolph Schayes (1928–2015), National Basketball Association Hall of Fame player and coach
- Dolph Sweet (1920–1985), American actor
- Dolph van der Scheer (1909–1966), Dutch speed skater who competed in the 1936 Winter Olympics

=== Surname ===
- Charles L. Dolph (1918–1994), American professor of mathematics
- Cyrus A. Dolph (1840–1914), American businessman
- John Henry Dolph (1835–1903), American painter
- Joseph N. Dolph (1835–1897), U.S. Senator from Oregon from 1883 to 1895

=== Stage or ring name ===
- Young Dolph (1985–2021), American rapper
- Dolph Ziggler, a ring name of American professional wrestler Nick Nemeth (born 1980)

== Fictional characters ==
- Dolph the Fascist Hippo, in a Danish cartoon strip and TV cartoon
- Dolph Starbeam, a recurring character in The Simpsons

== Places ==
- Dolph, Arkansas, an unincorporated community
- Dolph, Michigan
- Dolph, Oregon, an unincorporated community

== See also ==
- Dolf (disambiguation)
