= Adolf Kaufmann =

Austrian artist (1848–1916)

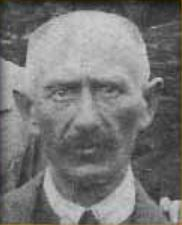
Adolf Kaufmann (date unknown)

Adolf Kaufmann (15 May 1848 – 25 November 1916) was an Austrian landscape and marine artist.

== Biography ==
Kaufmann was born in Opava in Silesia, Austrian Empire. He was initially self-taught, but completed his studies with the animal painter, Émile van Marcke, in Paris and undertook several study trips, throughout Europe and the Middle East. His residence alternated between Paris, Berlin, Düsseldorf and Munich.

In 1890, he decided to settle in Vienna and opened a studio in the Wieden district. In 1900, together with Carl von Merode and Heinrich Lefler, he opened an "Art School for Ladies". He continued to visit Paris frequently and, when he painted there, signed his works with the pseudonym "A. Guyot". Other names he signed with include "A. Papouschek", "G. Salvi", "A. Jarptmann", "R. Neiber", "J. Rollin" and "M. Bandouch". Why he did this is unclear, although his choice of signature often reflects stylistic differences.

His landscapes were influenced by the Barbizon school and the style known as "paysage intime", both of which he was exposed to in France during the 1870s.

He was a frequent exhibitor and won numerous awards; notably at the Exposition Universelle (1900). From 1890 to 1913, he was a member of the Vienna Academy of Fine Arts; representing them at exhibitions at the Glaspalast in Munich and the Große Berliner Kunstausstellung. He became a full member of the Vienna Künstlerhaus in 1909. His travels continued until they were cut short by the beginning of World War I.

Kaufmann died on 25 November 1916 in Vienna.

any of his works were acquired by members of Royal and noble families; notably Emperor Napoleon III, Princess Stéphanie of Belgium, Archduke Friedrich, Duke of Teschen, Tsar Nicholas II and Queen Isabella II of Spain. His works may be seen at the Silesian Museum (Opava), the Pera Museum in Istanbul and the Leopold Museum in Vienna.

== Selected paintings ==
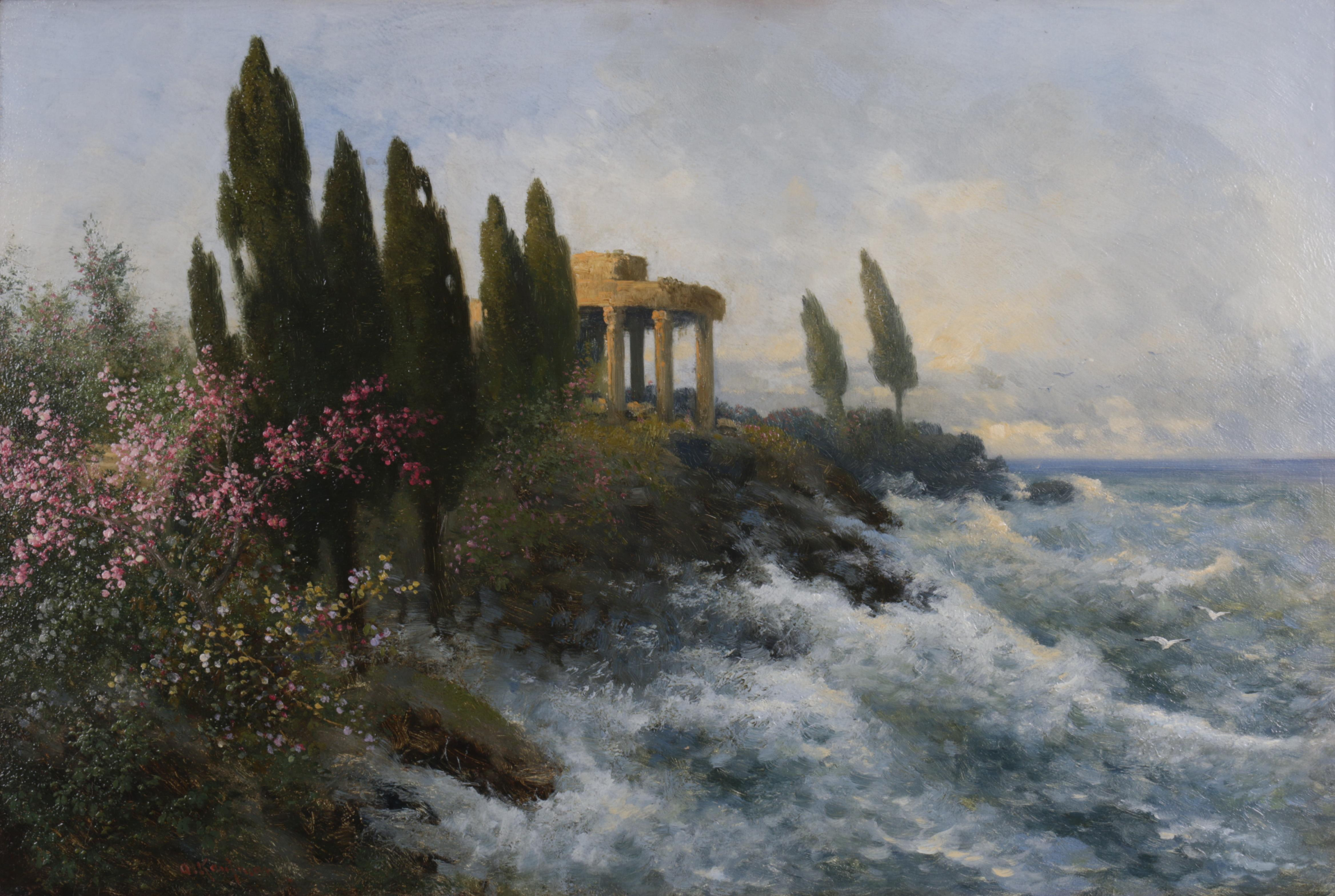
Mediterranean Landscape with Ancient Temple

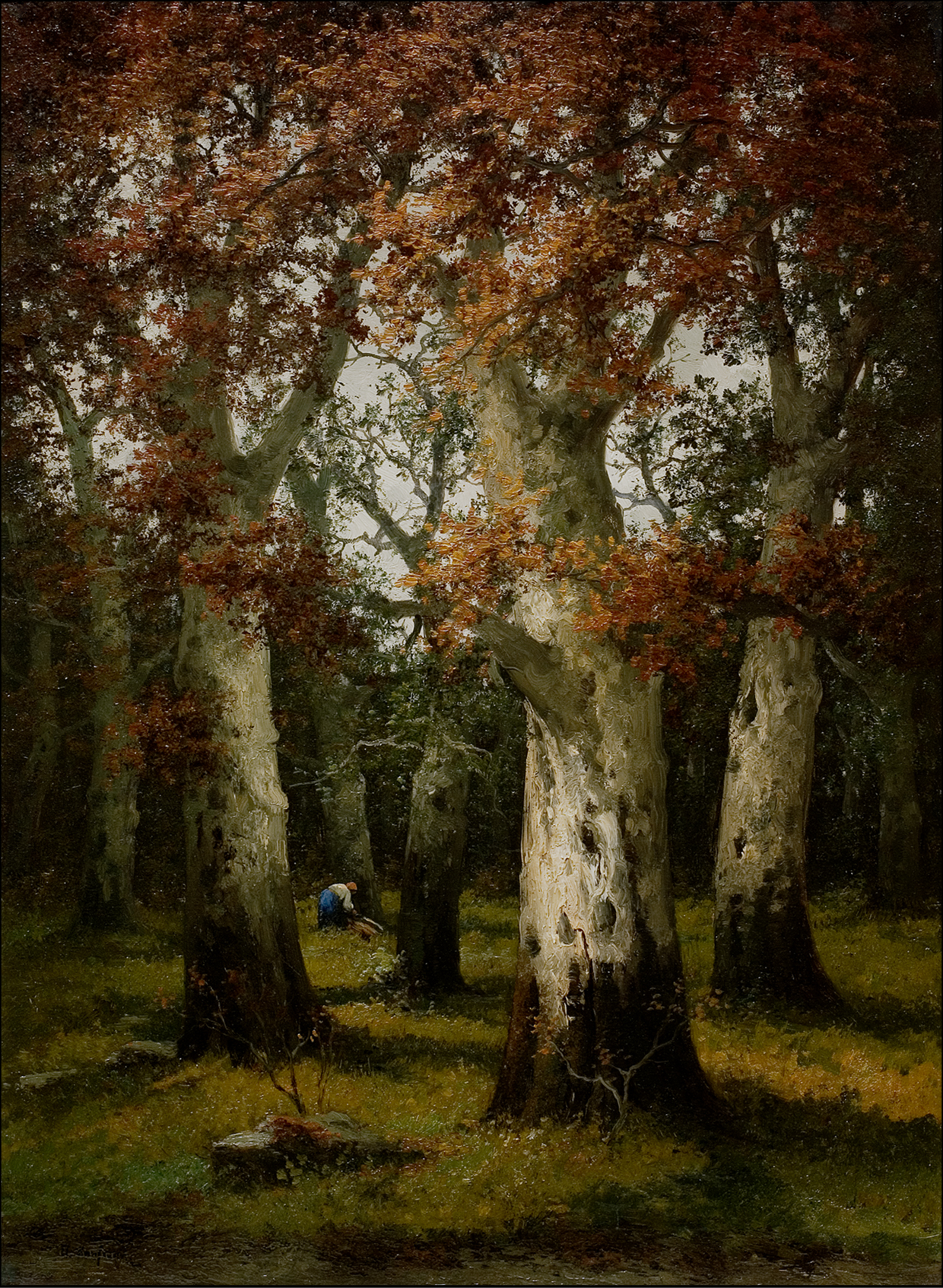
The brushwood collector

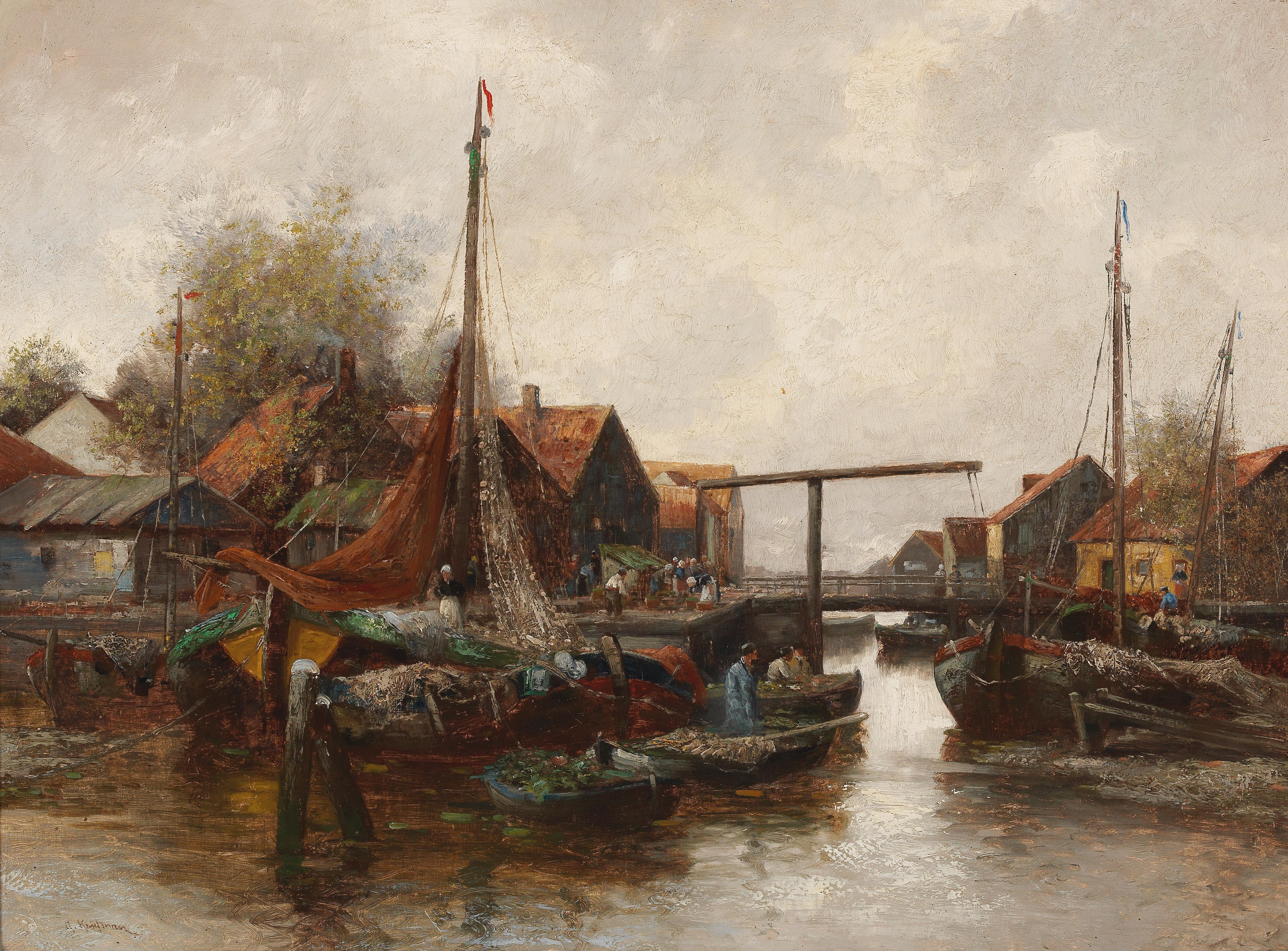
In the Harbor

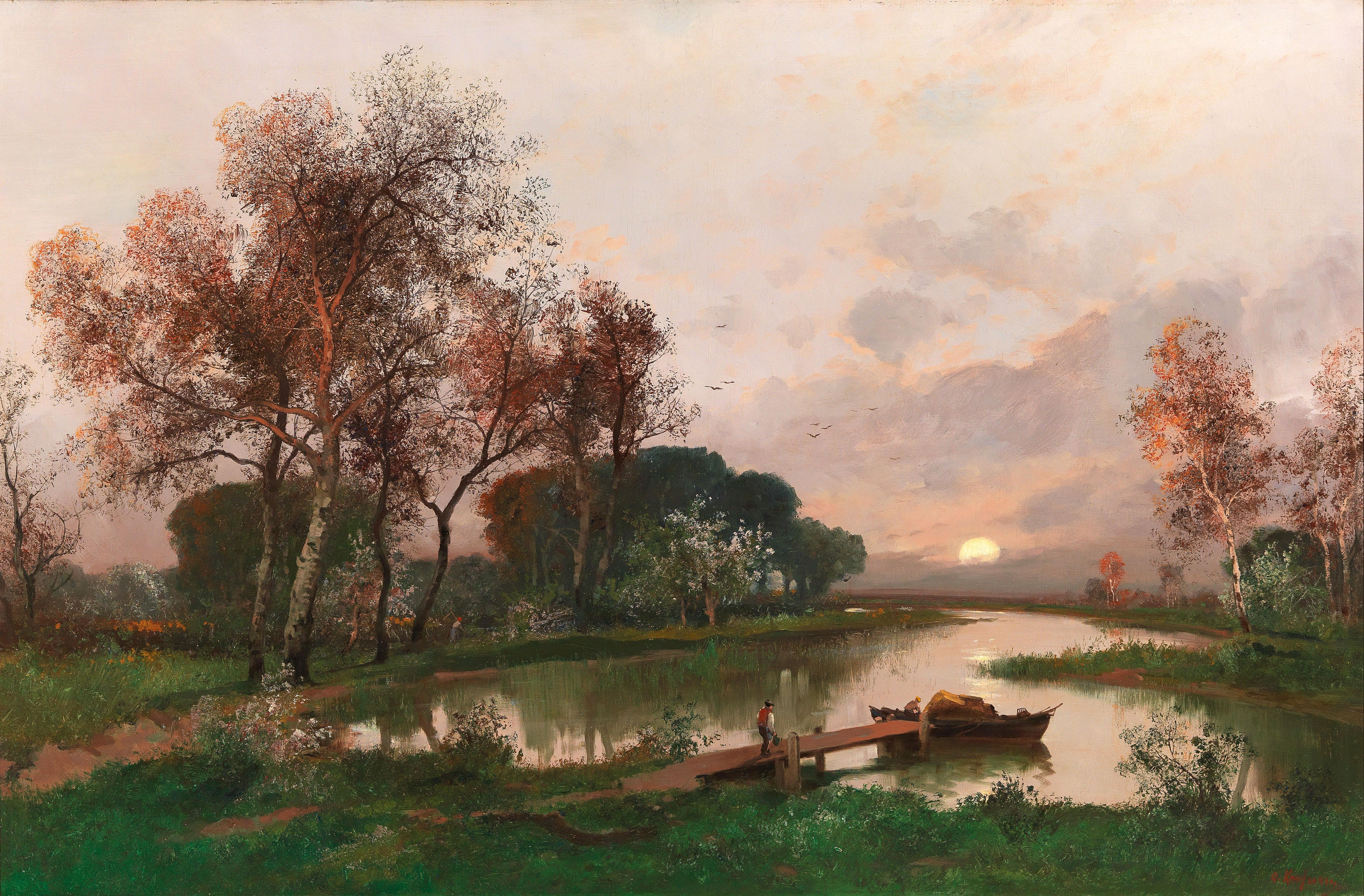
Landscape with a Pond

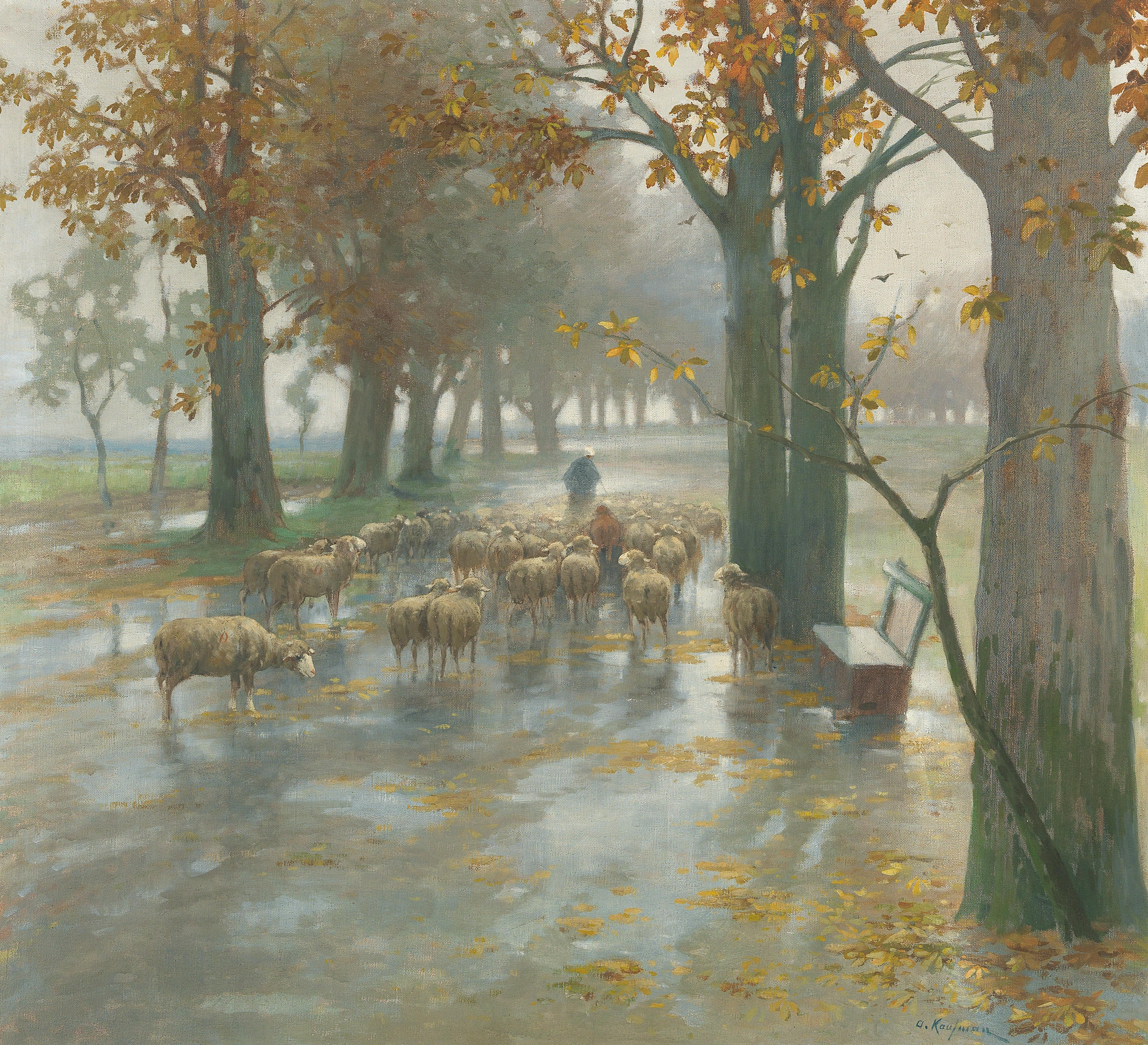
Flock of Sheep on a Rainy Day

== Sources ==
- Anna Ahrens/Lisa Hackmann: "Kaufmann, Adolf (Pseud.: u.a. A. Guyot)" In: Savoy, Bénédicte und Nerlich, France (Eds.): Pariser Lehrjahre. Ein Lexikon zur Ausbildung deutscher Maler in der französischen Hauptstadt. Vol. 2: 1844–1870. De Gruyter, Berlin/Boston 2015 ISBN 978-3-11-031477-9
- Heinrich Fuchs: Die österreichischen Maler des 19. Jahrhunderts, self published, Vienna, 1973, Vol.2
- "Kaufmann Adolf". In: Österreichisches Biographisches Lexikon 1815–1950 (ÖBL). Vol. 3, Austrian Academy of Sciences, Vienna 1965, p. 269 f. (Direct links to "p. 269", "p. 270")
