= Raid on Charles Town =

1684 Spanish Raid

Coordinates: 25.06°N 77.345°W

Date	19 January 1684
Location	Charles Town, the Bahamas, West Indies
Result	Spanish victory

Belligerents
Spain	England

Commanders and leaders
Juan de Alarcón	Gov. Robert Clarke (POW)

Strength
201 men 2 vessels	

Casualties and losses
Unknown, minimum.	700~ prisoners 4 ships destroyed 1 ship taken

The Raid on Charles Town, or Spanish raid on New Providence, was a Spanish naval expedition on 19 January 1684 (O.S.) led by Cuban corsair Juan de Alarcón against the English privateering stronghold of Charles Town (later renamed Nassau), capital of the Bahamas. The Bahamian settlements and defenses were reduced to ruins, and the Spanish carried off the governor in chains, together with the inhabitants.

== Background ==
The Bahamas harboured pirates and privateers who preyed on Spanish ships. Governor Clarke, described as "one of Cromwell's officers" justified privateering as necessary for the colony's defence, but in one letter of marque he authorized offensive attacks on Spanish holdings far from the Bahamas. Clarke's encouragement of privateering contravened and jeopardized the 1667 and 1670 treaties of Madrid, which established peace between the English and Spanish. On 19 January 1684 (O.S.), a Spanish expedition reduced the Bahamian settlements and defenses to ruins, carrying off the governor in chains, together with the inhabitants.

== Raid ==
Spain's corsair Juan de Alarcón stealthily approached to New Providence with a commission issued by Governor José Fernández de Córdoba and a pair of barcos luengos carrying 200 men. Having seized a woodcutting sloop off the island of Andros, Alarcón compelled its master William Bell to pilot in via the eastern channel. At daybreak Alarcón disembarked 150 men within a half-mile outside Charles Town (later Nassau), while his corsair ships bore down upon the six vessels anchored in its harbour.

Charles Town's population consisted of approximately 400 free men capable of bearing arms, perhaps 200 free women, a like number of children, and 200 enslaved people. Taken utterly by surprise, they were incapable of mounting an effective defense. Former governor Robert Clarke was wounded and captured as he attempted to mount a feeble countercharge, while his recently arrived successor Robert Lilburne fled from his bedroom in the Wheel of Fortune, along with most other residents. The 10-gun New England frigate Good Intent of Capt. William Warren and another anchored vessel managed to escape across the bar, leaving the Spaniards to pillage the remaining four ships and quickly ransack the town, loading their plunder aboard their largest prize before torching the rest and sailing away that same evening. Clarke was subsequently tortured to death and his body was roasted after an approved judgement set by the Inquisition. John Oldmixon claimed that Clarke died being roasted on a spit after the Spaniards had captured him.

After leaving Charles Town Alarcón hastened across to northern Eleuthera and visited a like treatment upon its English settlement, before returning to Charles Town on 15 November 1684 (O.S.) to set fire on its buildings and carry off numerous residents to Havana. The Bahamas subsequently remained devoid of any recognizable English presence until December 1686, when a small contingent from Jamaica under the preacher Thomas Bridges reoccupied New Providence Island, where more colonists gradually joined them.

== Aftermath ==
Most of its buildings were burned, and the Bahamas were left depopulated. Some 200 colonists sought refuge on Jamaica while another 50 from northern Eleuthera temporarily resettled in Casco (Maine), leaving the Bahamas with no English presence until 1686. Upon the departure of the Spaniards, the settlers pulled themselves together again and a new governor, Robert Lilburne, came back from England.
