= Operation Adolphe =

- Part of the First Indochina War
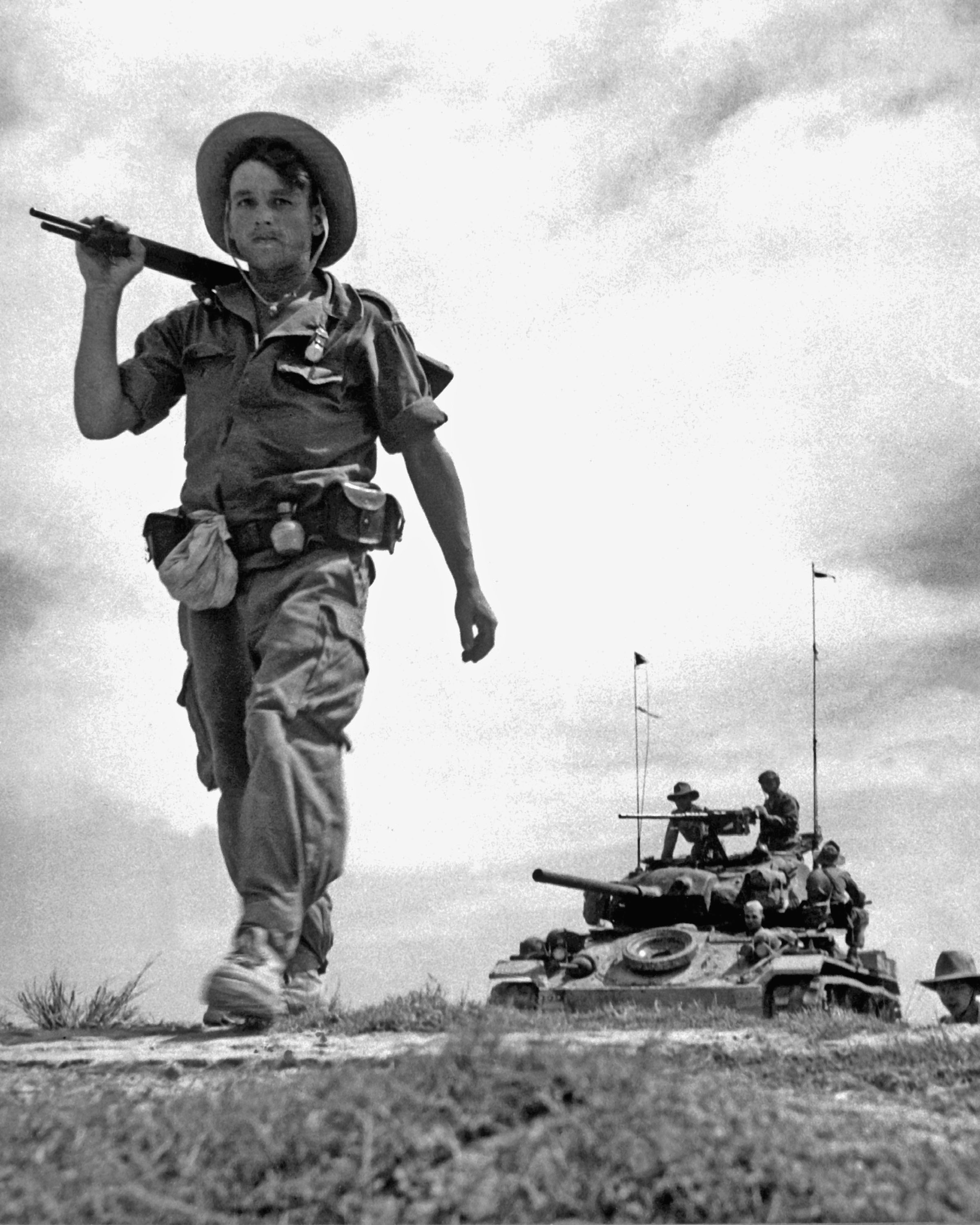
- A French Foreign Legion unit patrols in a Vietminh controlled area.
Date	March 29 – April 3, 1953
Location	French Indochina

Belligerents
French Union: France; French Indochina; State of Vietnam	Democratic Republic of Vietnam: (North Vietnam) Việt Minh

Commanders and leaders
Jean Brechignac; Marcel Bigeard	

Operation Adolphe (also referred to as Adolph) a military operation by the French Army that took place during the First Indochina War, commencing in April 1953. It was the last of several operations that spring, concluding before the monsoon season made campaigning difficult until the commencement of Operation Camargue in July.
