= Udolphus =

- Gender: Male

Udolphus is a masculine given name, a variant of Adolphus, and may refer to:

- Basil Udolphus Aylmer, 11th Baron Aylmer (1886–1977)
- Udolphus Aylmer, 7th Baron Aylmer (1814–1901)
- Udolphus Aylmer Coates (1908–2000), British town planner
- Udolphus Haron (360–392), fictional duke of Frisia
- Udolphus Wright, actor in Mixed Marriage
