= Karel Josef Adolf =

Czech painter (1715–1771)

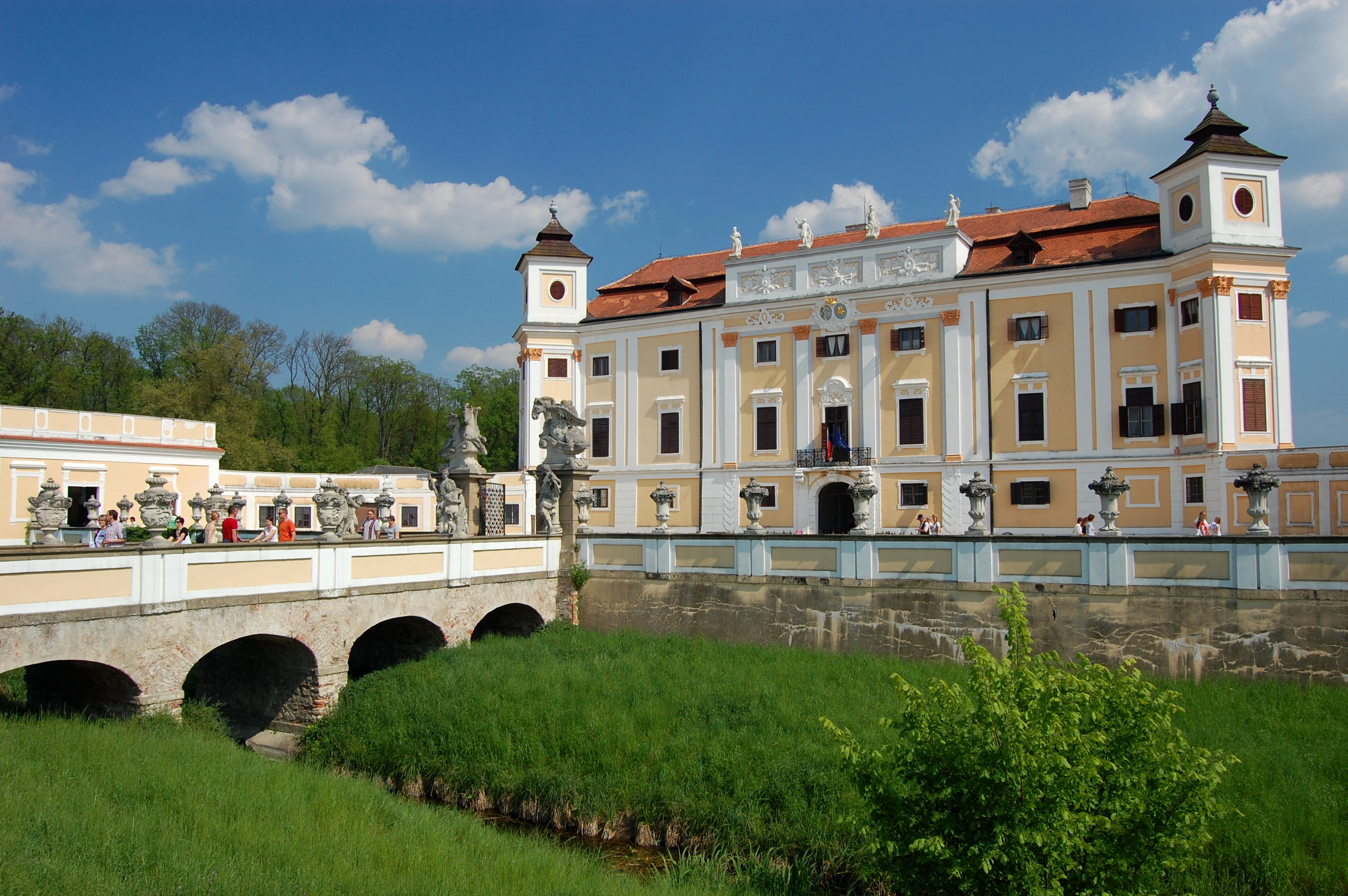
Milotice chateau - Karel Josef's birthplace

Karel Josef Adolf also as Adolph (1715–1771) was a Czech painter, restorer and valet in the service of the Olomouc bishops.

== Biography ==
He was a member of a large family of painters. His father Josef František Adolf (around 1685–1762) worked as court painter of the Mikulov Ditrichštejn and Milotice Serényi aristocratic families. However, the best-known of the whole family was Karl Josef's younger brother, František Adolf of Freenthal (1721–1773).

Karel Josef was born during his father's stay at the Milotice chateau, probably on September 4, 1715, since we know he was baptized that day. We know nothing about the education of young Adolf, we can only assume that he received his first painting training from his father and that perhaps as his younger brother he studied at the Academy of Fine Arts in Vienna. He then served as a valet and court painter for three Olomouc bishops: for Ferdinand Troyer between years 1745 and 1758, for Leopold Egkh between years 1758 and 1760 and for Maximilian of Hamilton between years 1760 and 1776. He was considered a skilled painter of hunting still lifes and paintings with animal motifs, some of which are still displayed in the picture gallery of the Kroměříž Castle. His is known for his paintings with allegorical themes, for portraits and decorative paintings. At the Episcopal Court, he was recognized as an art connoisseur. He served as an artistic adviser and was in charge of an extensive episcopal collection of paintings. He also worked as a restorer in the episcopal gallery. Other nobles engaged him as a restorer as well.

== Other Sources ==
- ČOUPEK, Milan. Několik poznámek k životopisu malířské rodiny Adolfů (Adolph). In: Vlastivědný věstník moravský 43, č. 2 (1991), s. 179–184.
- LUNGA, Václav. S paletou a štětcem v ruce - Karel Josef Adolf a Jan Nepomuk Horák. In: Malovaný kraj: národopisný a vlastivědný časopis Slovácka. Roč. 52, č. 2 (2016), s. 10–11.
- SLAVÍČEK, Lubomír. Karel Josef Adolph refecit. Kroměřížský malíř jako restaurátor obrazů ve službách Dominika Ignáce hraběte Chorynského z Ledské. In: Zprávy památkové péče. Časopis státní památkové péče. Roč. 72, č. 6 (2012), s. 500–503.
