= Adolff =

Adolff is a German surname. Notable people with the surname include:

- Heinz Paul Adolff (1914–1943), German Major of Reserves, Paratrooper officer during World War II
- Kurt Adolff (1921–2012), German racing driver

== See also ==
- Adolf
