= Nina Avgustinovna Adolf =

Russian botanist (1903–1951)

- Born: 1903
- Died: 1951 (aged 47–48)
- Occupation: Russian botanist
- Scientific career
- Author abbrev. (botany): Adolf

Nina Avgustinovna Adolf (1903–1951) was a Russian botanist.
