= Adulf mcEtulfe =

Possible king of northern Northumbria

Adulf mcEtulfe (died 934) may have been King of Bamburgh (northern Northumbria).

The Annals of Clonmacnoise note the death of Adulf mcEtulfe in 934. The historian Alex Woolf suggests that the entry records the death of Ealdred I, a ruler of Bamburgh who is last recorded in 932, and that subsequent Scottish intervention in Bamburgh may have been the cause of King Æthelstan's invasion of Scotland in the same year. On the other hand, Neil McGuigan regards Adulf and Ealdred as different people.

== Sources ==
- Hudson, Benjamin T. (2004). "Ealdred (d. 933?), leader of the Northumbrians". Oxford Dictionary of National Biography. Oxford University Press. doi:10.1093/ref:odnb/39225.(subscription, Wikipedia Library access or UK public library membership required)
- McGuigan, Neil (2018). "Bamburgh and the Northern English Realm: Understanding the Dominion of Uhtred". In McGuigan, Neil; Woolf, Alex (eds.). The Battle of Carham, A Thousand Years On. Edinburgh, UK: John Donald. pp. 95–150. ISBN 978-1-910900-24-6.
- Woolf, Alex (2007). From Pictland to Alba: 789–1070. Edinburgh University Press. pp. 163–165. ISBN 978-0-7486-1233-8.
