= Adolf of Osnabrück =

German Cistercian monk, Bishop of Osnabrück and saint

Saint Adolf of Osnabrück O.Cist
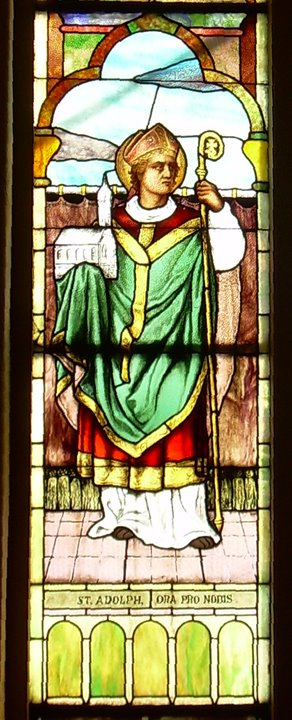

Monk and bishop
- Born: c. 1185; Tecklenburg, Duchy of Westphalia, Electorate of Cologne, Holy Roman Empire
- Died: 30 June 1222 or 1224; Osnabrück, Hanseatic League
- Venerated in: Catholic Church (Cistercian Order and Osnabrück, Germany)
- Canonized: 1625 by Pope Urban VIII
- Major shrine: St. Peter Cathedral, Osnabrück, Lower Saxony, Germany
- Feast: 11 February
- Attributes: A bishop holding a small church

Adolf of Osnabrück, O.Cist (also known as Adolphus, Adolph, Adolf of Tecklenburg), was born in Tecklenburg about 1185, a member of the family of the Counts of Tecklenburg in the Duchy of Westphalia. During his lifetime, he became known as the "Almoner of the Poor", and is honored as a saint by the Catholic Church.

== Life ==
Adolf became a canon of the Cathedral of Cologne, but then entered a Cistercian monastery, where he became known for his piety. In 1216, he was elected Bishop of Osnabrück (after the pope had canceled an earlier election) and maintained charitable programs there. He died on 30 June 1222 or 1224.

== Veneration ==
Adolf's cultus was recognized by Pope Urban VIII in 1625. His feast day is celebrated on 11 February.
