= Curron J. Adolphe =

American politician (fl. 1868–1872)

Curron J. Adolphe was an American state legislator in Louisiana. He represented New Orleans in the Louisiana House of Representatives from 1868 to 1872 as a Republican. He was African American. He worked as a grocer and served on the State Library Committee.

Adolphe also served as the State Tax Collector for the Third District.

== See also ==
- African American officeholders from the end of the Civil War until before 1900
