= Adolphus Ludigo-Mukasa =

Ugandan Roman Catholic martyr

Saint Adolphus Ludigo-Mkasa
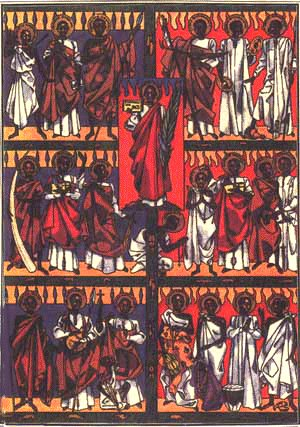
- Adolphus Ludigo-Mkasa and his companions

Martyr
- Born: c. 1861; Toro, Uganda
- Hometown: Kyarwehikyo
- Died: 3 June 1886; Namugongo, Uganda
- Cause of death: Burnt alive
- Venerated in: Catholic Church
- Beatified: 1920, Rome, Kingdom of Italy by Pope Benedict XV
- Canonized: 18 October 1964, Rome, Vatican City by Pope Paul VI
- Major shrine: Basilica Church of the Uganda Martyrs, Namugongo and also Katoosa martyrs shrine in Kyenjonjo District
- Feast: 3 June
- Patronage: Farmers, herdsmen and hunters

Adolphus Ludigo-Mukasa, also known as Adolofu Mukasa Ludigo (c. 1861 – June 3, 1886), Adolf Mukasa Ludigo was a Ugandan Catholic martyr.

== Life ==
Ludigo-Mukasa was a Munyoro from Misenyi Village in Myeri Katoosa Catholic parish in Kyenjonjo district. He was a son of late Bamwesekesa (father) and Kajoote Kahinju(mother).

At a young age, he was abducted by Baganda raiders in around 1850 together with his mother Kajoote in Kyarwehikyo a few kilometres from the Katoosa Rocks and became a companion of Charles Lwanga at court. Ludigo-Mukasa was put in charge of the Kabaka’s gardens. His name was changed from Tibeyalirwa to Ludigo the Kabaka's palace after he studied christianity.

Protestant missionaries began arriving in Buganda in 1877, followed two years later by the Catholic Missionaries of Africa. King Muteesa I welcomed the missionaries and played off the Catholics, Anglicans, and the Moslem traders, seeming to favor first one, then another, for political gain. The court was at Nabulagala, with a Catholic mission nearby at Kasubi. It was there that Ludigo-Mukasa began to take religious instruction around 1881.

Young King Mwanga II succeeded to the throne in 1884 at the age of about sixteen. He came to see the Christians as a threat, partly due to German incursions on the coast, and because the Christians encouraged the pages in his court to resist his advances.

Adolphus received his baptism on November 17, 1885. King Mwanga demanded that Christian converts abandon their new faith and executed many Anglicans and Catholics who did not. Adolphus was one of many Christians put to death by the king between 1885 and 1887. He was burnt alive on the 3rd of June 1886 in Namugongo at the age of about twenty-five. His day of martyrdom, June 3, is remembered as the feast day of the Uganda Martyrs.

== Family and relatives ==
Ludigo has relatives who include; Evangeline Kabaruli who was born on 04 September 1919 (a niece from his paternal uncle).
