= Nassau Village-Ratliff, Florida =

- CDP
- Location in Nassau County and the state of Florida
- Coordinates: 30°29′54″N 81°49′05″W
- Country: United States
- State: Florida
- County: Nassau

Area
  - Total: 14.66 sq mi (37.98 km^{2})
  - Land: 14.66 sq mi (37.98 km^{2})
  - Water: 0 sq mi (0.00 km^{2})
- Elevation: 23 ft (7.0 m)

Population (2020)
  - Total: 5,561
  - Density: 379/sq mi (146.4/km^{2})
- Time zone: UTC-5 (Eastern (EST))
  - Summer (DST): UTC-4 (EDT)
- FIPS code: 12-47787
- GNIS feature ID: 2403327

Nassau Village-Ratliff is a census-designated place (CDP) in Nassau County, Florida, United States. The population was 5,561 at the 2020 census, up from 5,337 at the 2010 census. It is part of the Jacksonville, Florida Metropolitan Statistical Area.

== Geography ==
The main roads through the community are U.S. Routes 1 and 23, though Florida State Road 115 runs through the northeastern edge of the community. The southwestern side is bordered along Thomas Creek Road and the Norfolk Southern Railway Valdosta District.

According to the United States Census Bureau, the CDP has a total area of 14.8 square miles (38.4 km^{2}), all land.

== Demographics ==
Historical population
Census	Pop.	Note	%±
1990	4,047		—
2000	4,667		15.3%
2010	5,337		14.4%
2020	5,561		4.2%
U.S. Decennial Census

=== 2020 census ===
As of the 2020 census, Nassau Village-Ratliff had a population of 5,561. The median age was 43.5 years. 21.7% of residents were under the age of 18 and 17.7% of residents were 65 years of age or older. For every 100 females there were 97.8 males, and for every 100 females age 18 and over there were 97.0 males age 18 and over.

0.0% of residents lived in urban areas, while 100.0% lived in rural areas.

There were 2,035 households in Nassau Village-Ratliff, of which 30.2% had children under the age of 18 living in them. Of all households, 57.9% were married-couple households, 15.2% were households with a male householder and no spouse or partner present, and 20.9% were households with a female householder and no spouse or partner present. About 18.5% of all households were made up of individuals and 8.8% had someone living alone who was 65 years of age or older.

There were 2,168 housing units, of which 6.1% were vacant. The homeowner vacancy rate was 1.6% and the rental vacancy rate was 7.5%.

Racial composition as of the 2020 census
Race	Number	Percent
White	4,959	89.2%
Black or African American	93	1.7%
American Indian and Alaska Native	27	0.5%
Asian	53	1.0%
Native Hawaiian and Other Pacific Islander	7	0.1%
Some other race	61	1.1%
Two or more races	361	6.5%
Hispanic or Latino (of any race)	199	3.6%

=== 2000 census ===
As of the census of 2000, there were 4,667 people, 1,640 households, and 1,353 families residing in the CDP. The population density was 315.1 inhabitants per square mile (121.7/km^{2}). There were 1,708 housing units at an average density of 115.3 per square mile (44.5/km^{2}). The racial makeup of the CDP was 97.45% White, 0.39% African American, 0.56% Native American, 0.28% Asian, 0.15% from other races, and 1.18% from two or more races. Hispanic or Latino of any race were 0.96% of the population.

There were 1,640 households, out of which 38.3% had children under the age of 18 living with them, 68.0% were married couples living together, 8.5% had a female householder with no husband present, and 17.5% were non-families. 13.8% of all households were made up of individuals, and 5.7% had someone living alone who was 65 years of age or older. The average household size was 2.85 and the average family size was 3.11.

In the CDP, the population was spread out, with 27.0% under the age of 18, 8.1% from 18 to 24, 29.9% from 25 to 44, 25.2% from 45 to 64, and 9.8% who were 65 years of age or older. The median age was 36 years. For every 100 females, there were 100.6 males. For every 100 females age 18 and over, there were 98.1 males.

The median income for a household in the CDP was $43,442, and the median income for a family was $46,857. Males had a median income of $35,340 versus $24,924 for females. The per capita income for the CDP was $17,410. About 5.5% of families and 6.8% of the population were below the poverty line, including 7.4% of those under age 18 and 10.8% of those age 65 or over.
