= Nassau Street (Winnipeg) =

Street in Manitoba

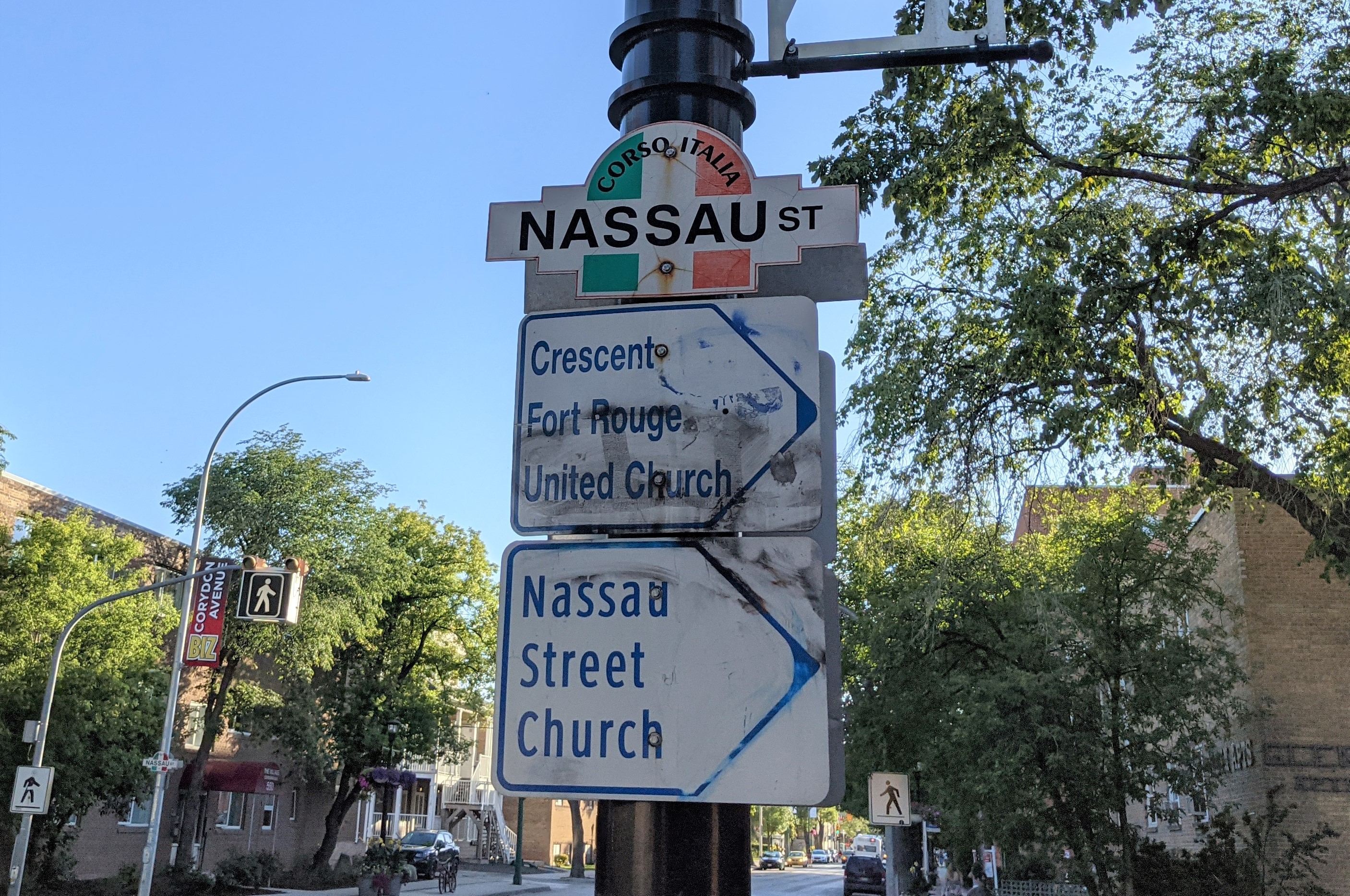
- Nassau Street sign at Corydon Avenue
- Interactive map of Nassau Street
- Former names: Llewellyn Street; Henry Street
- Owner: City of Winnipeg
- Length: 2.0 km (1.2 mi)
- Location: Winnipeg, Manitoba
- Postal code: R3L
- Coordinates: 49.865°N 97.139°W
- Major junctions: Roslyn Rd. Stradbrook Ave. River Ave. Corydon Ave. Pembina Hwy.
- North: Roslyn Rd.
- South: Kylemore Street

Construction
- Inauguration: 1908; 118 years ago

Other
- Known for: 55 Nassau St. N

Nassau Street is a 2-kilometre (1.2 mi) street in Winnipeg, Manitoba, located partially within the Osborne Village and Fort Rouge neighbourhoods.

The north terminus of Nassau St. North is Roslyn Crescent and travels in a southeast direction, crossing Pembina Highway, swinging southwest before joining up with Garwood Avenue. Its route length is 1.3 km (0.81 mi)

The north terminus of Nassau St. South is Brandon Avenue and travels in a southeast direction ending near Churchill Drive with a break near Kylemore Avenue. Its route length is 700 m (0.43 mi).

== Notable locations ==
55 Nassau, a 38-floor condominium in the Fort Rouge area, is currently the 5th-tallest building in Winnipeg and the tallest residential building in the city (until the completion of the Artis Reit Residential Tower on 300 Main Street). At the time of its opening in 1970, it was the tallest apartment building in western Canada, standing at 109 metres (358 ft) tall.

738 Nassau is a multifamily housing complex designed by Manitoba architect Gustavo da Roza.

Also on this road are the Nassau Street Church (formerly Gospel Mennonite Church; 232 Nassau) and St. Luke’s Anglican Church (130 Nassau), which became a municipally-designated historic building in 2018.
