= Irreligion in Egypt =

Lack of religious belief or religion by some of Egypt's population

Irreligion in Egypt is controversial due to the prominence of conservative social traditions and the persecution by the religious institutions in the country. It is difficult to quantify the number of atheists or agnostics in Egypt, as the stigma attached to being one makes it hard for irreligious Egyptians to publicly profess their views and beliefs.

Furthermore, public statements that can be deemed critical of Islam, Christianity and Judaism can be tried under the country's notorious blasphemy law. Outspoken atheists, like Alber Saber, Kareem Amer, and others, have been convicted under this law. These types of crime in Egypt hold a status similar to Antragsdelikt, legal proceedings only occur if a citizen, usually an official from the religious establishments, takes the step of filing against the person engaging in blasphemy, and cases are not initiated by the general prosecutor; also, officials from the religious institutions, specifically al-Azhar institution, issue fatwa to permit the killing of those who blaspheme if the Egyptian government does not do it, such as in the case of Hamed Abdelsamad, and in the case of Farag Fouda who was shot dead in 1992 by Islamists as a consequence, among others. In 2000, an openly atheist Egyptian writer, who called for the establishment of a local association for atheists, was tried on charges of insulting Islam in four of his books.

== Estimates of the number of irreligious Egyptians ==
According to the 2020 US report on international religious freedom, there are no reliable estimates of the number of atheists in Egypt. A study at the University of Kent, citing a 2018 Wave V survey by Arab Barometer, stated that around 11% of Egyptians identified themselves as not religious. In the same Arab Barometer Wave V survey, 90.4% said they were Muslim, 9.6% were Christian, and 0.1% had no religion. In the same Arab Barometer 2018 Wave V survey, about 20% of young Egyptians described themselves as not religious. Absent official figures, sources consistently report that the number is increasing steadily. According to a 2023 report by Arab Barometer, the percentage of Egyptians identifying as non-religious has decreased by 6% in the 2021-2022 survey compared to the 2018 Wave V survey. The 2021-2022 Arab Barometer findings indicate a rise in religious sentiment, with 95% of Egyptians identifying as either religious or somewhat religious.

Egyptian media has since 2011 reported increases in the number of nonbelievers and atheists publicly coming out; however, atheism or skepticism is not a recent phenomenon in Egypt. Despite the lack of clarity with regard to absolute numbers, there is a noticeable increase in young Egyptians coming out for nonbelieving and publicly testifying they have left the faith, especially on the internet.

In December 2014, Dar al-Ifta, a government-affiliated Islamic centre of education and jurisprudence, claimed that there are 866 atheists in Egypt. Commenting on the small number cited by Dar al-Ifta, Rabab Kamal, a spokesperson for The Secularists, a small but vocal group that lobbies for a secular state, said that "[Dar al-Ifta] are in denial", and she added: "I could count more than that number of atheists at al-Azhar university alone." (Al-Azhar university is the Cairo-based Islamic institution that is widely regarded as the seat of global Sunni learning.) The tiny estimates by Dar al-Ifta prompted high amusement among Egyptian atheists and secularists in Egypt, who say that atheism is on the rise, and that even Dar al-Ifta's definitions of atheism seemed comic. Many Egyptian irreligious/atheist intellectuals encourage irreligious Egyptians and Egyptian atheists to speak up and come out of the closet, a trend which is visible regarding both faiths, Islam and Christianity, and involves Egyptian men as well as Egyptian women. Many atheists in Egypt communicate with each other over the internet.

== Controversy and discrimination ==
Discrimination against atheists in Egypt is mainly the result of the religious establishments in the country, as the laws and policies in Egypt protect religious freedom but punish those who ridicule or insult the Abrahamic religions by words or writing, whereas insulting other non-Abrahamic faiths like Buddhism or Hinduism is not punishable by Egyptian law but insulting Islam, Christianity, or Judaism is.

In 2014, the Ministry of Youth and the Ministry of Awqaf announced a joint strategy to combat the spread of what they categorized as "harmful ideas" among the nation's youth, and they included atheism in that categorization. In a 2011 Pew Research poll of 1,798 Muslims in Egypt, 63% of those surveyed supported "the death penalty for people who leave the Muslim religion." However, no such punishment actually exists in the country. In January 2018, the head of the parliament's religious committee, Amr Hamroush, suggested a bill to make atheism illegal, stating that "it [atheism] must be criminalised and categorised as contempt of religion because atheists have no doctrine and try to insult the Abrahamic religions".

In July 2015, it was announced by Pope Tawadros II that a global survey to understand why some youth leave the church would be carried out. The results were not published; however, it was estimated that 70% of the youth stop attending the Evangelical church, and nearly a decade later, about half return to church. The Egyptian Council of Churches, of which the Coptic Orthodox Church is a member, along with other Orthodox, Catholic and Protestant Egyptian churches, had plans to confront atheism in Egypt by planning establishments of interfaith committees involving churches and mosques with the aim of controlling and confronting atheism among members of both faiths.

Atheists or irreligious people cannot change their official religious status, thus statistically they are counted as followers of the religion of their family, whether it is Islam or Christianity. Despite hostile sentiments towards them, atheists in Egypt have become increasingly vocal since the Egyptian revolution of 2011 and particularly after the ouster of Morsi in 2013.

== List of some famous non-religious Egyptians ==
- Hamed Abdel-Samad
- Ismail Adham
- Kareem Amer
- Aliaa Magda Elmahdy
- Sherif Gaber
- Adam Elmasri
- Ismail Mohamed
- Nawal El Saadawi
- Alber Saber
- Maikel Nabil Sanad

== See also ==
- Religion in Egypt
- Secularism in Egypt
- Freedom of religion in Egypt
- Christianity in Egypt
- Islam in Egypt
- Demographics of Egypt
