= Egyptian religion =

Egyptian religion may refer to:

- Ancient Egyptian religion
- Modern religion in Egypt
