= Confettigate =

Confettigate may refer to:

- Journalist Josephine Witt's protest at a press conference of the European Central Bank in 2015
- The purported Just Stop Oil protestor at George Osborne's wedding in 2023
