= Mikael Mikael =

German artist

Mikael Mikael (born 1974) is a German artist.

== Life ==
Mikael Mikael grew up in Wiesbaden, Germany. He studied Fine Art at the Universität der Künste Berlin (UdK) and at the HFBK University of Fine Arts Hamburg HFBK. Subsequently, he worked as VJ in the midst of Berlin's wild club scene. 2009 he received a scholarship from the Berlin Senate for a stay in New York. 2011 he received yet another scholarship from the Akademie Schloss Solitude. (Engl. Academy Schloss Solitude), Stuttgart, Germany.

== Art / Work ==
Mikael Mikael's works are conceptually developed as interventions within the physical and discursive public space. Installations are documented through photography and video, whereas the documentations can stand as self-contained works themselves. In November 2011 a specific work by the artist Mikael Mikael appeared in a photograph depicting female Israelian activists, holding up the poster that reads "Show you are not afraid", demonstrating their solidarity and support for the Egyptian Blogger Aliaa Magda Elmahdy.

== Exhibitions ==
2011

- Retreat #1, Akademie Schloss Solitude, Stuttgart (Solo-Exhibition)
- Unheimlich vertraut – Bilder vom Terror, C/O Berlin, Berlin

2013

- Rauchwolken und Luftschlösser (26 January – 10 February 2013), GAK Gesellschaft für aktuelle Kunst, Bremen
- Show you are not afraid (25 January – 10 March 2013), Akademie Schloss Solitude, Stuttgart

== Awards / Scholarships ==
- 2011: Scholarship – Akademie Schloss Solitude, Stuttgart
- 2009: New York-Scholarship – Berlin Senate

== Editions ==
- Jean-Baptiste Joly, Akademie Schloss Solitude (Hg.): Easy To See Who Is Coming and Going, Stuttgart: Edition Solitude, 2012, ISBN 978-3937158693
- Mikael Mikael: WHITE OUT, Berlin: Merve, 2011, ISBN 978-3883963129
- Felix Hoffmann (Hg.): Unheimlich vertraut – Bilder vom Terror, Köln: Verlag der Buchhandlung Walther König, 2011, ISBN 978-3863350826
