= Sherif Gaber =

Egyptian political activist and blogger

- Born: Sherif Gaber Abdelazim Bakr; 10 February 1993 (age 33); Ismailia, Egypt
- Occupations: YouTuber, Political activist
- Known for: Being arrested in Egypt for atheist activism in the Middle East, criticising Islam, supporting LGBT rights.

Sherif Gaber Abdelazim Bakr (Arabic: شريف جابر عبد العظيم بكر, romanized: Šarīf Ǧābir ʿAbd al-ʿAẓīm Bakr pronounced [ʃɪˈɾiːf ˈɡæːbeɾ ʕæbdelʕɑˈzˤiːm bɑkɾ]; born 10 February 1993, in Ismailia, Egypt) is an Egyptian political activist, blogger and YouTuber who was arrested on October 27, 2013, for professing atheism, contempt of religion relating to activities on campus and atheist statements online.

== Biography ==
Gaber has been making satirical videos that criticise religions for years. By December 2025, his YouTube channel had over 521,000 subscribers, making him one of the best-known critics of religion in Egypt. With titles such as "Does God exist?", "Evolution and religion are incompatible" and "Criticising religion is a human right", his videos brought him into legal troubles. The Egyptian law against blasphemy, Article 98(f) of the Penal Code, was eventually used to justify his arrest.

=== Argument with teacher ===
Gaber enrolled in Suez Canal University in Ismailia, as a sociology student. He claimed to be 'one of the best students in class', but that changed when he got into a verbal argument with a psychology teacher, who has said that homosexuality is a 'sin' and gay people 'should be crucified in the middle of the street'. A few months after this incident, fellow students forwarded some of his Facebook postings to the rector, who reported it to the police.

=== Arrest and court case ===
At 3:00 a.m. on October 27, 2013, three armored state security cars and an army vehicle arrived at Gaber's house. A number of state security agents entered his apartment, conducted a search, and confiscated all of his property, including but not limited to his school papers and documents, books, his PC, mobile phone, and his money. After that, they threw him in the car and took him to jail. Gaber claimed the prison guards mistreated him and punished 'every part' of him.

On December 3, 2013, the court agreed to release Gaber after paying £E7,500 (£E2,500 for the "Contempt of Religion" charge and £E5,000 for "spreading immoral values and abnormal thoughts that provoke and disturb the public peace and the national security of Egypt.") He was released the next day, but his case was ongoing. He was allowed to resume his studies, but suspected the teachers deliberately made him repeatedly fail his tests.

On February 16, 2015, Gaber (aged 22) was found guilty and sentenced to one year in jail. He was allowed to appeal if he paid £E1,000, but instead Gaber went into hiding. By that time, the rector had quit the university, and claimed he did not recall the 'incident'.

=== Hiding and re-arrest ===
Gaber's whereabouts were unknown, but he was still releasing pro-science and pro-human rights videos on YouTube.

On March 31, 2018, Gaber published a tweet about an imminent arrest, call for calm among his supporters and claimed he would "keep making videos when I get out.. I'll write the scripts in prison."

On Saturday May 5, 2018, Gaber was arrested once again and imprisoned. Several media associated his arrest with a large number of arrests around the time of the March 2018 reelection of president El-Sisi, including a fellow satirical video maker named Shady Abuzaid (or Shadi Abuzeid) a week after Gaber.

=== Escape attempts ===
Mina Ahadi called for solidarity with Gaber on 26 July 2019 (German).

On October 1, 2018, Gaber tweeted saying that his passport was confiscated at an Egyptian airport, and that he was banned from leaving the country. He also said that there were two "different ongoing blasphemy charges" against him, and that he couldn't share more details. As of October 12, 2018, the total number of felony charges against him, each one of them punishable up to 15 years in Egyptian prison, amounted to five "ranging from blasphemy, insulting Islam, contempt of religion, supporting homosexuality, shaking the peace of the society and 'religious extremism'".

In late January 2019, Gaber made an online appeal to aid him financially in order to escape from Egypt with a new nationality, such as that of Dominica, after being stopped at the airport when travelling to Malaysia in 2018. He obtained a few thousand dollars shortly after launching the crowdfunding campaign. However, the action was not progressing according to plan, and on 11 July Gaber made an emotional appeal on Twitter, saying that he had almost lost all hope and was "on the verge of committing suicide" if no help came soon. Mina Ahadi of the Central Council of Ex-Muslims called for solidarity with Gaber, and pleaded with the German government to commence negotiations to get him to Germany or elsewhere in Europe. The U.S. Embassy in Egypt reported in December 2019 that he had not been detained as of that date. Gaber has shared on social media that he is "banned from leaving Egypt indefinitely", and on January 21, 2021, posted on Twitter that he is "going to productively spend the time left to my freedom but most importantly on myself. Please be patient. Things will be different for the better."

Kacem El Ghazzali highlighted Gaber's case before the UNHRC in a plea for the abolition of blasphemy laws.

=== Renewed conviction ===
In May 2024, an Egyptian Misdemeanor Court in Ismailia ruled to imprison Gaber for five years, accusing him of publishing videos that disdain the Islamic religion and incite atheism. On 3 November 2025, Gaber was arrested in Cairo. After around fifty-six days, he was brought before a prosecutor.

== YouTube Videos ==
=== Is ISIS Islamic? ===
In the video, Gaber expresses annoyance with the phrase "Daesh [ISIS] does not represent Islam" commonly heard in Egypt, and expressed also by Al-Azhar, the leading center of Sunni Islam in Egypt and the Middle East.

He claimed that the history of Islam is filled with violence and in any Islamic country, there will always be organized groups like ISIS, or people committing crimes in the style of ISIS. Adding that most people are ignorant about the real history of Islam, that directly after the death of the Islamic prophet Mohamed, began the Muslim conquest of India. The conquest, he cites, is recorded as the bloodiest conquest in history. The total number of people that died because of the crusaders, he said, is 1.7 million, while he cites the total number of people who died because of the Muslim conquest of India alone is estimated around 60 to 80 million people, out of originally a population of 400 million people. However, such numbers have been questioned and critiqued as to how historically accurate they are. Gaber blames the Muslim's intent to spread Islam in a country, with only Buddhists and Hindus, was the reason that they committed mass murder, destruction of their holy places, mass rape and enslavement of the women and children. This history, Gaber continues shall never be taught in schools [referring to schools in Egypt and other Middle Eastern Muslim countries].

Gaber argues that Daesh [ISIS] are not extremist, they are well-read and well-educated about the Islamic religion, its history, and they are trying to repeat this history today. Gaber also challenges the Muslim viewer asking if they are upset about Daesh's beheadings of Christians, why they are not also upset about the Islamic prophet Mohammed's beheadings of 700 Jewish people. Critics of Gaber object that this number appears to be reported by Ibn Ishaq, who wasn't a contemporary of the Prophet nor his companions, with either weak or no chain of transmission at all.
