= Amina Tyler =

Tunisian activist (born 1994)

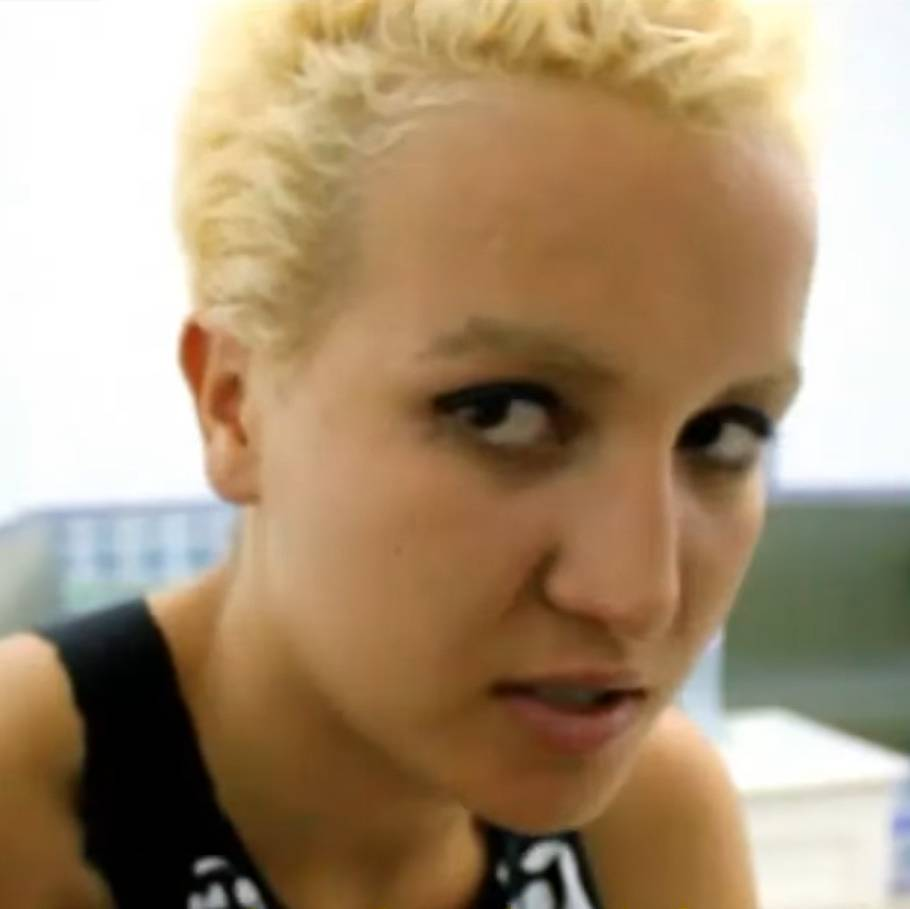
- Tyler in 2013
- Born: Amina Sboui; 7 December 1994 (age 31); Tunisia
- Occupation: Activist

Amina Tyler (Arabic: أمينة تايلر; born 7 December 1994 as Amina Sboui, أمينة السبوعي) is a Tunisian student, women's rights activist, anarchist and a former member of the feminist group Femen.

== Biography ==
=== Nude photo "My body is mine" ===
External image
- "My body is mine and not the source of anybody's honour"

On 11 March 2013, Tyler was the first Tunisian woman to post a photograph of herself nude from the waist up on Facebook, with the phrase "My body is mine and not the source of anybody's honour" in Arabic. The photo was seen as scandalous and evoked strong controversies within Tunisian society comparable to the nude self-portraits of the Egyptian Aliaa Magda Elmahdy two years earlier. On 16 March, the popular talk host Naoufel Ouertani invited her to his show on Ettounsiya where she appeared disguised by pixellation. She explained that it was not for sexual reasons that she appeared topless but to call out their demands for the women's liberation in a patriarchal society.

Imam Adel Almi issued a fatwa for her to be punished with 100 lashes and stoned to death.

=== Imprisonment ===
On 19 May 2013 she painted the name "FEMEN" on a cemetery wall in Kairouan, to protest against the annual congress of Salafi party Ansar al-Sharia. She was arrested and brought to Messaadine jail in Sousse. She faced up to 1 year in prison

Tyler's father, the medical doctor Mounir Sbouï, told the French newspaper Libération in an interview that his daughter made a mistake but did not commit a crime. The long time militant and campaigner of the socialist Democratic Forum for Labour and Liberties, who had left the party only after it joined the Troika government, said he was even proud of his daughter who "defended her ideas" and who also brought him to reconcile with his own values making him understand that one needs to be active.

Maryam Namazie interviews Amina and Aliaa Elmahdy (8 March 2014).

International protests followed for her release from detention. On 29 May 2013, three FEMEN members held a topless protest in front of the Tunis court to demand her release while shouting "Free Amina!" and "A women's spring is coming!" (a reference to the Arab Spring). On 12 June 2013 a Tunisian judge convicted the two French and one German FEMEN members to four months and one day imprisonment for public indecency while protesting for the release of Tyler. The protestors, Pauline Hillier, Marguerite Stern, and Josephine Markmann, were released on 26 June 2013 after a Tunisian court lifted their prison sentence.

Amina Tyler was acquitted for contempt and defamation on 29 July 2013, but she remained jailed pending trial on a separate charge of desecrating a cemetery.

=== Later activism ===
FEMEN had staged protests in front of the Tunisian embassy in Paris where they chanted 'Amina akbar! FEMEN akbar!' (referencing the Takbir) and in front of the Grand Mosque of Paris burning a Tawhid flag. Upon release in August 2013, Tyler declared that she was leaving the group in protest, adding that she thought FEMEN's actions in Paris were disrespectful to 'the religion of others' and because she saw a lack of financial transparency in the organisation. Inna Shevchenko reacted with surprise: "It’s thanks to this campaign that Amina is out of prison."

In 2013, Tyler moved to Paris, where she completed high school and co-authored an autobiography, published in February 2014 under the title My Body Belongs to Me (ISBN 978-2259223157). During International Women's Day on 8 March 2014, Tyler and seven other Arab and Iranian women, including Maryam Namazie and Aliaa Elmahdy, protested naked for women's rights at the Louvre Pyramid, chanting slogans in French in favour of freedom, equality and secularism (liberté, égalité et laïcité).

In 2015, she was listed as one of BBC's 100 Women.

As of 2018, Tyler, known sometimes as Amina Sboui, was the sole public facing volunteer/presenter for Shams Rad, a Tunisian LGBTQ media outlet and radio station belonging to Association Shams, a LGBTQ rights NGO founded in 2015.
