= Ismail Mohamed (activist) =

Arab atheist activist (born 1983)

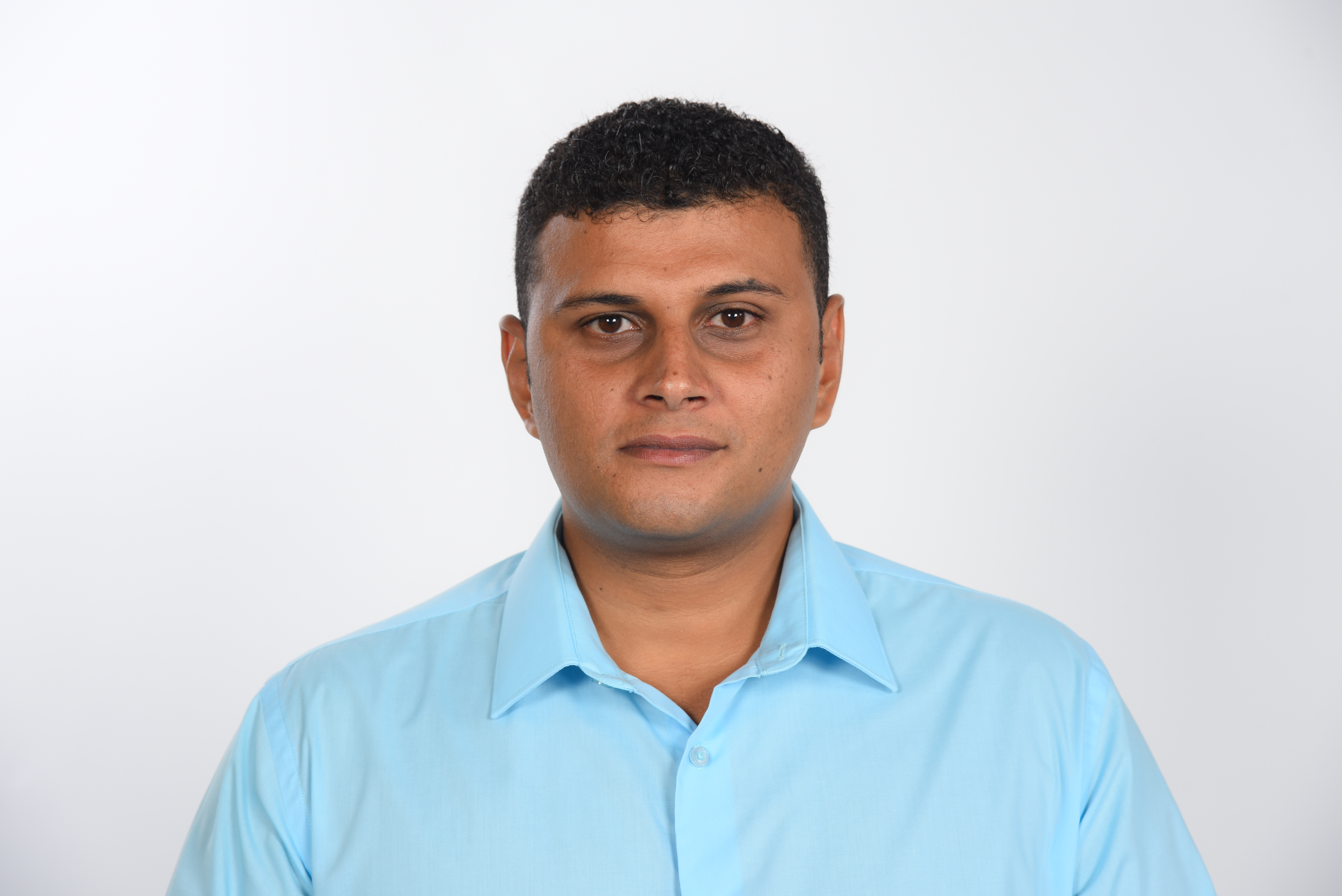
- Ismail Mohamed in 2018.
- Born: 9 June 1983 (age 43); Alexandria, Egypt
- Education: Alexandria University
- Occupation: Host of The Black Ducks programme
- Known for: Atheist human rights activism
- Website: The Black Ducks

Ismail Mohamed (born 9 June 1983) is an Egyptian atheist activist, blogger and producer of The Black Ducks programme (برنامج البط الأسود Barnamaj al-Bati al'Aswad, or al-Bath as-Sawda for short). He is also a contributing editor to Arab Atheists Magazine (مجلة الملحدين العرب Majalat al-Mulhadayn al-e-Arab). His last name is sometimes transcribed as Mohammed.

== Biography ==
=== Early life and education ===
Ismail Mohamed was born in Alexandria on 9 June 1983. At the age of 5, the family moved to Jordan, and returned to Egypt after 9/11. (Mohamed was aged 18; he recalled that in Jordan, many people regarded Osama bin Laden as a 'Muslim hero' back in the day). His father didn't actively practice Islam, and although he lacked a college education, he had a passion for science and encouraged Ismail to read books and gather information online when the Internet emerged. Unlike Mohamed's father, his uncle, who helped raise him, was a devout man who took him to the mosque and forced him to memorise the Quran. During his adolescence, Mohamed's love for music, especially Michael Jackson's songs, came into conflict with his religious fervour and his community.

=== Exploring atheism and science ===
Mohamed began studying the topic of apostasy in Islam when numerous online atheists were imprisoned following accusations of "insulting religion", which is subject to Egypt's anti-blasphemy law. Although he was a liberal Muslim and knew little about atheism, he questioned whether the arrests were fair. In the process, he explored atheism and the sciences, including a materialist view of evolution which he was never taught in school. “The science is sure the story of humans is not Adam and Eve. This forced me to search. And I was surprised with many things. I started to study the religions of the Middle East. I read the history of Abrahamic religions.” He also learnt the English language in 2012, which granted access to a lot more information such as the writings of Christopher Hitchens, Sam Harris, Richard Dawkins — as well as Egyptian secularist thinkers. He left Islam in 2012 and eventually came out as an atheist to his parents, who took some time to accept it, but embraced the debate and started questioning parts of Islam themselves, while still holding on to the religion.

=== The Black Ducks ===
Ismail Mohamed introduces The Black Ducks programme in English.

In 2013, Mohamed launched The Black Ducks programme, an online talk show which according to The New York Times seeks to "offer a space where agnostic and atheist Arabs can speak freely about their right to choose what they believe and resist coercion and misogyny from religious authorities." Mohamed himself described the programme as "a show featuring interviews spanning the broad spectrum of Arab atheists and non-religious people from all over the Middle East and North Africa, providing a platform where they can speak freely without fear, sounding their demands for equal rights and demonstrating that they really do exist." He explained that a 'black duck' is the Arabic equivalent of a black sheep in the English language: "An oddity, a misfit." The Black Ducks was started in Cairo with nothing more than a computer, speakers and a small piece of paper featuring the show's logo. Every guest interviewed by Mohamed comes from across the Middle East, usually explaining why they left Islam and how they deal with their apostasy and atheism in everyday life in their respective societies. In some cases, women from Saudi Arabia appeared on the show from behind their computers unveiled, despite the hijab being mandatory in their state. Not all guests are necessarily atheists; sometimes religious people, especially from minority religions in the MENA region, or LGBT people, are invited to bring their perspective.

Mohamed states the show's goals and addresses criticisms (2017).

Ismail Mohamed made a breakthrough as the first outspoken atheist appearing on Egyptian television in November 2013, being invited to discuss irreligion not long after posting his first Black Ducks video. He calmly and 'confidently' made his case for nonbelief, despite being ridiculed by the host and call-in guests. Amongst the things he said was: "We are not trying to divide the society more than it already is, we simply ask the complete freedom of belief as it exists in any modern state." A YouTube excerpt of the interview went viral quickly, reaching hundreds of thousands of views within a few months. Many were amazed, with political analyst and human rights activist Hisham Kassem saying: "I never thought I would see this in my lifetime." At the time, Mohamed was studying at Alexandria University's Faculty of Education, while working at a laundry shop; he was barred from working at many other companies because of his irreligious activities. He would go on to become an Internet developer by 2015.

Some people have argued or threatened that Mohamed should be killed for being an apostate, and he has occasionally been beaten up or threatened with death in the streets of Alexandria and Cairo when passers-by recognised him from the show. In a Cairo café, a few months after being beaten up in Alexandria, he faced a crowd of hundreds of people angrily cursing him for publicly saying God doesn't exist. He escaped with his life when the police arrived. Several months later, he and his wife relocated to a town on the Red Sea coast, where he feels safer because of the presence of tourist police.

Despite the threats, Mohamed remained tenacious, arguing that if more former Muslims speak out, leaving Islam will be normalised and there will be fewer threats as a result. In June 2015, when there were about 18 Arab atheist online talk shows, he was the only host who had not fled his country to seek asylum in the West, having produced about 160 episodes on Egyptian soil. Unlike other programmes, The Black Ducks is much less aimed at criticism of Islam, and more about advocating the rights of nonbelievers and accepting their growing presence in society. According to Mohamed, the Egyptian revolution of 2011 has enabled young atheists in the country to be heard after decades of censorship. By June 2018, Mohamed had produced over 300 Black Ducks episodes.

=== Media appearances ===
Secular Conference 2017 passes a resolution condemning the Egyptian government's persecution of Ismail Mohamed and all other freethinkers.

During a February 2014 interview with BBC News journalist Hadya Alalawi in Alexandria, Mohamed said he and his fellow nonbelievers wanted to normalise atheism in Egypt instead of having to leave the country where his family and job are. While the interview was going on, they were interrupted by passers-by, who objected to him expressing and spreading his atheistic views publicly.

Mohamed stated that he believes the El-Sisi administration is open to atheism, citing media reports of the president speaking in favour of atheists in a meeting with intellectuals in January 2015. “I believe El-Sisi understands the backwardness we’ve reached by way of prior religious speech. [El-Sisi] saved us from the darkness of Muslim Brotherhood rule,” Al-Ahram quoted Mohamed as saying. He further advocated the adoption of a set of laws, such as a civil marriage law which would enable interfaith marriages or atheists to marry outside of the church or the mosque.

On 24 March 2015, Mohamed participated in an open discussion between non-religious Egyptians, moderated by researcher Amr Ezzat and hosted by the Religion and Freedoms Forum at the headquarters of the Egyptian Initiative for Personal Rights. To an audience member who said that atheists would receive more sympathy if they did not frequently "insult religion", Ahmed Harkan answered that "We have the right to express ourselves," and Ismail Mohamed added: "Can we first have our rights before we talk about insults and foul language?"

At the 22–24 July 2017 Secular Conference in London, themed "International Conference on Freedom of Conscience and Expression", Mohamed was scheduled to speak during the panel discussion on the documentary Islam's Non-Believers. Although he was granted a visa by the British authorities, Egyptian authorities stopped him at the airport and prevented him from travelling to the UK. In response, the Conference Organising Committee drafted a brief resolution, adopted by the attendees, which stated: "The International Conference on Freedom of Conscience and Expression is outraged to learn that the Egyptian government has prevented Ismail Mohamed from speaking at our conference, where he would have been a crucial voice. We demand that the Egyptian government allow Ismail freedom of movement and end his persecution and that of all freethinkers." At the subsequent award ceremony (31:32), Mohamed was given an award for his efforts to emancipate non-believers in Egypt and the wider MENA region. Maryam Namazie commented: "We stand with you, Ismail, always and forever." In his absence, the award was accepted by Imad Iddine Habib on Mohamed's behalf.

During a June 2018 interview, Mohamed stated that Muslim-majority countries like Egypt are great places for conservative Muslim heterosexual men to live in, but bad for others, especially atheists and LGBT people: "No one can declare his atheism and remain in the same social and professional life. (...) The majority of those who declared atheism are now social outcasts." "I am not gay, but I have gay friends who live in very difficult circumstances. Almost all of them live a double life. [Members of] the community may be married to another sex or show that they love the opposite sex, but in fact, they are gay or lesbian."
