= Ahmed Harkan =

Egyptian human rights activist

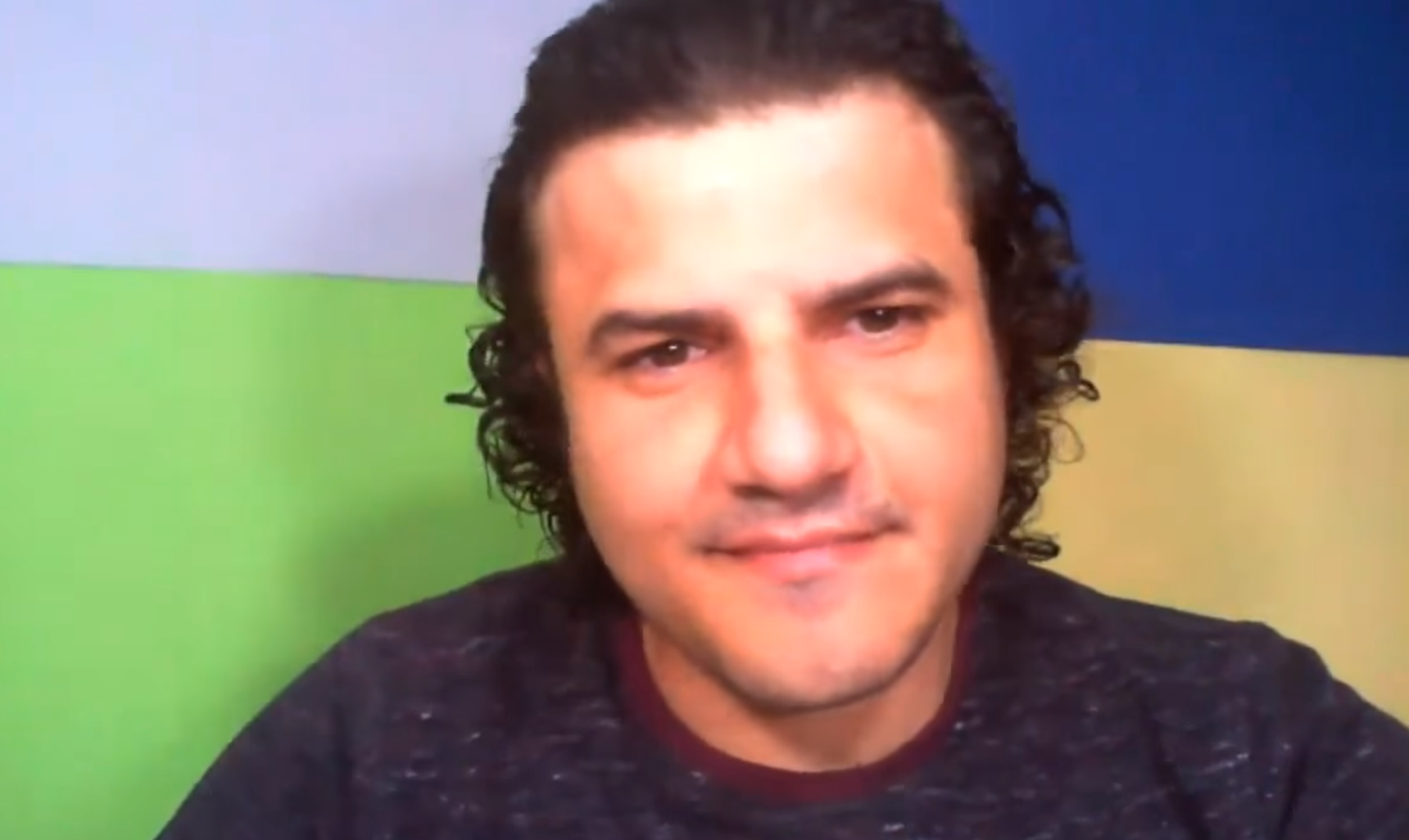
- Ahmed Harkan speaking on his YouTube channel in March 2018
- Born: Ahmed Hussein Harkan; 10 December 1982 (age 43); Alexandria, Egypt
- Known for: Human Rights Activism
- Spouse: Nada Mandour alias Sally Harkan (m. 2014; div. 2016)

Ahmed Hussein Harkan (Arabic: أحمد حسين حرقان [ˈæħmæd ħeˈseːn ħɑɾˈqɑːn]) (born 10 December 1982) is an Egyptian free speech activist. He is a blogger, vlogger and founder of the Free Mind e-channel, and frequently appeared on several Egyptian talk shows to discuss the rights of nonbelievers during his 10 years as an atheist and activist from 2010 until 2020. On March 30, 2020, four months after completing a 57-day hunger strike protesting for his right to leave Egypt and marry his fiancée in Tunisia, Harkan said he had returned to Islam. After he managed to leave Egypt to Tunisia in January 2021, Harkan returned to his activities again as an atheist activist. And after a few months he spent in Tunisia he moved to Italy and continued his activities.

His first name is alternately romanised as Ahmed and Ahmad, his surname as Harkan and Harqan. Sometimes he used only his first and second name to identify himself as Ahmed Hussein.

== Early life and education ==
Harkan grew up in a Muslim family oriented toward the Salafi movement in Islam. He received religious education from the Islamic scholar Yasser Al Borhamy. He spent a large part of his youth as an ultra-conservative Salafist Muslim fundamentalist. In June 2010, at the age of 27, Harkan decided to break with his past, burn all his religious certificates and start his education from scratch. His mother was in shock when he revealed his atheism, and his sheikh Yasser sent him to a psychiatrist, who concluded Harkan wasn't insane but just an atheist. Yasser rejected the diagnosis and insisted Harkan was "sick with doubt".

== Activism ==
Since his apostasy, Harkan was among the few non-believers in Egypt who dared to speak openly about being atheist, and he was invited to appear on several Egyptian talk shows to discuss the rights of non-religious citizens.

=== 2014 assassination attempt and arrest ===
According to media reports, Harkan and his pregnant wife, Nada Mandour (Sally) Harkan, survived an assassination attempt on the evening of 25 October 2014. Harkan managed to flee with his wife after receiving some injuries and went to the Alhanafie–Alajlany police station to report the incident, along with their friend Karim Jimy. The attackers chasing them told the police Harkan had "insulted Islam and compared the Prophet to Islamic State" on television. Instead of taking action to help Harkan and his wife and his friend, the police officers further assaulted them and they were imprisoned and charged with blasphemy and "defamation of religion" under article 98 in the Egyptian penal code for asking "What has ISIS done that Muhammad did not do?” on an Egyptian television talk show. Harkan's lawyer was humiliated and kicked out of the police station. After 24 hours in detention, Ahmad and Sally Harkan and their friend Jimy were released, and charges against them were dropped. However, they had to move to a different house to avoid threats and abuse.

=== Later activism ===
In the autumn of 2014, Harkan and Mandour launched the Free Mind TV channel, which seeks to promote non-religious liberal ideas. With Harkan as show host and Mandour as camera operator and director, episodes were recorded at a secret location in Egypt, and edited and produced in a studio in the United States by Iraqi producer Khaldoon Alghanimi.

Ahmed Harkan discussing sexual repression in the Middle East (2017)

On 24 March 2015, Harkan participated in an open discussion between non-religious Egyptians, moderated by researcher Amr Ezzat and hosted by the Religion and Freedoms Forum at the headquarters of the Egyptian Initiative for Personal Rights. Ezzat questioned whether Harkan's outspoken atheism on television was an effective method of activism: "I advised him [Harkan] not to do so publicly or he would go to prison, but he said society needed such a shock. I wonder if that shock would have a positive impact on the rights of non-believers." Harkan defended his appearance by saying: "If all atheists speak out, the state will no longer treat them as an undesired minority." To an audience member who said that atheists would receive more sympathy if they did not frequently "insult religion", Harkan answered that "We have the right to express ourselves," and Ismail Mohamed (host of The Black Ducks) added: "Can we first have our rights before we talk about insults and foul language?"

In October 2019, Harkan was banned from traveling outside of Egypt by national security in Cairo airport when he tried to travel to marry his fiancée in Tunisia. He went on hunger strike, ending after 57 days in December 2019.

=== Pretending Returning to Islam ===
On 30 March 2020, four months after completing a 57-day hunger strike protesting for his right to leave Egypt and marry his fiancée in Tunisia, Harkan said he had returned to Islam. in January 2021 harkan Left Egypt, Harkan said that when he decided to brake the hunger strike he had started to study a backup plan. After 57 days he went to the very south of Egypt Abo-Sunbul and Naser lake which is a border between Egypt and Sudan; there where he had a look at the Roadway that he might go through; which he eventually did cross it after a whole year of studying the situation, One of the essential steps that he made sure to be done before applying his plan is to announce that he have got back to Islam. The point behind this announcement was to avoid being recognized by terrorists while he is walking to Tunisia. Harkan made it to Tunisia all the way from Egypt walking literally on his feet passing by Sudan, Chad, Libya through the desert. After a while there in Tunisia Harkan moved to Italy.
