= Islam al-Behairy =

Egyptian writer and television host

- إسلام البحيري

Personal details
- Born: 1974 (age 51–52) Egypt Egypt
- Occupation: Intellectual, Television Host

Islam Behairy (Arabic: إسلام البحيري; born 1974 in Siflaq, Sohag Governorate), is an Egyptian intellectual and the host of With Islam on Al-Kahera Wel Nas. On November 5, 2018, he began a new program, "Islam Hurr" on Alhurra.

In April 2015, Behairy used his program to call for reforming Islam, sharply criticizing many prominent Islamic scholars and saying that many fatwas were wrong and people shouldn't take fatwas from scholars and should go directly to the Qur’an. Al-Azhar University has condemned his philosophy as an insult to Islam. Al Kahera suspended his program indefinitely. In 2015, Behairy was arrested, charged with insulting Islam, convicted, and sentenced to five years in prison. Behairy appealed the sentence but a court rejected his appeal. The sentence was reduced on appeal.
