= Aliaa Magda Elmahdy =

Egyptian women's rights activist

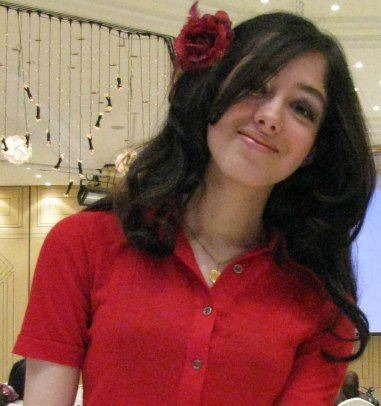
- Elmahdy in an undated photo, presumably in 2020
- Born: 16 November 1991 (age 35); Egypt
- Education: American University of Cairo
- Occupation: Activist

Aliaa Magda Elmahdy (Egyptian Arabic: علياء ماجدة المهدي, IPA: [ʕælˈjæːʔ ˈmæɡdæ (ʔe)lˈmæhdi, ˈʕæljæ-]; born 16 November 1991) is an Egyptian internet activist and feminist advocate. She became known for publishing a nude photo on her Blogspot page, which she described on Facebook as "screams against a society of violence, racism, sexism, sexual harassment and hypocrisy". Since then she became a subject of several death threats. Elmahdy describes herself as a "secular, liberal, feminist, vegetarian, individualist Egyptian" and has identified as an atheist since turning 16.

== Biography ==
=== Nude photo ===
In 2011 Elmahdy and another activist, Kareem Amer, were stopped for walking in a public park, with their arms over each other's shoulders (a public display of affection) and kissing, then taken to the park's security office, where they debated with managers of a public park who expelled them, and later posted mobile video footage.

Elmahdy posted the nude photo on 23 October 2011 and according to her tweet, took the photo herself in her "parent's home months before" she met Amer.

==== Reactions ====
Elmahdy's blog received over 2 million hits, with a number of insults. Pages for both support and protest against Elmahdy's action have been opened on Facebook. Fearing of becoming tainted in the eyes of Islamic conservatives, Egyptian liberals distanced themselves from Elmahdy. The 6 April Youth Movement issued a statement denying claims that Elmahdy is a member of the group.

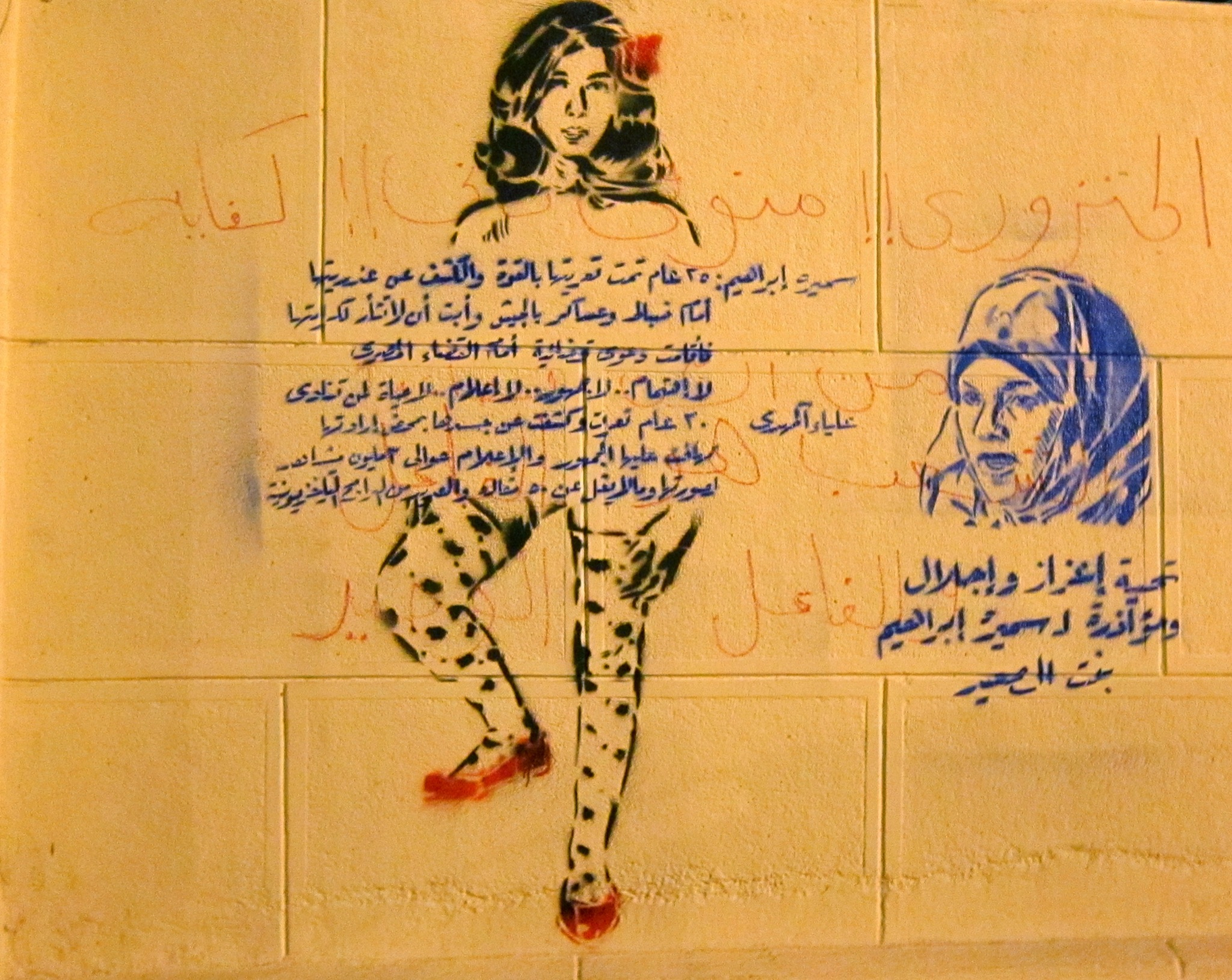
Stencil graffiti depicting Elmahdy, in the form of the nude blog photo of herself. Its text also refers to the case of Samira Ibrahim.

A case, filed by Islamic law graduates, accused Elmahdy and Amer of "violating morals, inciting indecency and insulting Islam". False rumors about her beating on the Tahrir Square and death have been spread since then.

Egyptian expatriates, Western-based Arab journalists and representatives of American art community have expressed their support. Iranian-born activist Maryam Namazie defined Elmahdy's action as "a scream against Islamism" and "the ultimate act of rebellion". According to actress Amanda Banoub, Elmahdy "displayed genuine purity and modesty without a single layer of clothing". Recalling the virginity tests carried out by the military to women in Tahrir Square, Egyptian-American journalist Mona Eltahawy noted that Elmahdy "is the Molotov cocktail thrown at the Mubaraks in our heads – the dictators of our mind – which insists that revolutions cannot succeed without a tidal wave of cultural changes that upend misogyny and sexual hypocrisy".

About forty Israeli women gathered via Facebook to "show support in a non-violent and legitimate way for a woman who is just like us – young, ambitious, full of dreams and evidently has a developed sense of humor". The participants were photographed behind a sign saying "love without limits" and "Homage to Aliaa Elmahdi. Sisters in Israel".

=== Flight to Sweden ===
Continuing the photographic theme of her protest, Elmahdy has subsequently called for men to submit images of themselves wearing veils "in an attempt to create awareness over hypocritical attitudes," and requested women "who wish to remove their veils to send her photographs of their faces, to be published online."

In 2012, Elmahdy sought political asylum in Sweden for fear of being jailed, after being kidnapped and receiving death threats. In December 2012, Elmahdy participated in a public nude protest outside the Egyptian embassy in Stockholm, together with Inna Shevchenko and another FEMEN member. The three naked activists protested against the "sharia-dictatorial" proposed Egyptian Constitution, drafted by Mohamed Morsi's government being voted on in a referendum in those days. Elmahdy had painted "Sharia is not a constitution" in red across her chest and stomach while holding an Egyptian flag.

Maryam Namazie interviews Aliaa and Amina Tyler (8 March 2014).

In July 2013 she was interviewed by Svenska Dagbladet where she stated that during her asylum process, the Swedish Migration Agency received several letters with continued death threats directed towards her. She expressed that she was able to wear trousers and a tank top while walking the streets without fearing being verbally or physically harassed, unlike in Egypt. When asked to comment on Islamic organisations claiming that her campaigning reduces the freedom of Muslim women to wear the veil, she responded that she has never seen a man exercise the freedom to wear a veil. In the interview she expresses doubt towards liberal supporters and stated her belief that many men who claim to oppose sexual harassment join campaign organisations simply to get laid.

In 2013, Elmahdy and two other Femen activists staged a protest in Stockholm mosque against Sharia law and the oppression of women. They were arrested by police for disturbing public order.

=== New nude protests ===
During International Women's Day on 8 March 2014, Elmahdy and seven other Arab and Iranian women, including Maryam Namazie and Amina Tyler, protested naked for women's rights at the Louvre Pyramid, chanting slogans in French in favour of freedom, equality and secularism (liberté, égalité et laïcité).

In August 2014, she released a photo of herself menstruating on the flag of the Islamic State of Iraq and the Levant (ISIL) wearing only shoes, while another woman defecated on it. Media in Islamic countries did not publish the photo, as the flag of ISIL features the Muslim declaration of faith.
