= Josephine Witt =

German activist (born 1993)

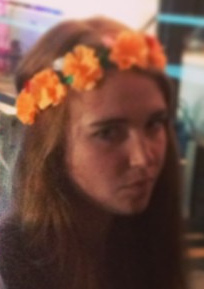
Witt in 2013

Josephine Witt (born Josephine Markmann or Marckmann; 22 June 1993) is a German activist and former member of the feminist group FEMEN.

Witt was born in Hamburg in 1993. Her mother is a physiotherapist and her father owns a solar panel business. After high school, she worked for eight months for a charity in Bolivia. She studied philosophy and dentistry at the University of Hamburg. In April 2013, she was involved in a FEMEN topless protest against Russian president Vladimir Putin during his visit to the Hannover Messe with German chancellor Angela Merkel. The following month, Witt and two other FEMEN activists were arrested in Tunis, where they were protesting the detention of Amina Tyler, another activist. Witt and her two fellow activists were convicted of lewd conduct in June and sentenced to four months and one day in prison; after a month, the remainder of the sentence was suspended and they were released. In an interview with a student magazine, Witt described the purpose of the Tunisia protest: "In FEMEN, we are concerned with the question of who owns women's bodies, when we go naked into the street, we do so with confidence and determination. We emphasize control over our own bodies."

Returning to her native Germany, Witt drew attention with another topless protest in December 2013, as she and another activist interrupted a television talk show to decry inhumane working conditions in Qatar, where the 2022 FIFA World Cup is to be held. In the middle of the show, the women bared their breasts, which had been painted to resemble soccer balls, and chanted "boycott FIFA mafia" and "don't play around with human rights." Later that month, she stormed the altar of the Catholic cathedral in Cologne during a Christmas mass to protest exclusion in the church. Again, she was topless, this time with the words "I am God" written on her breasts. Witt was later fined €1,200 for disturbance of religious practice; a man who struck her in the face during the protest was also fined €500 and required to write a letter of apology.

On 15 April 2015, Witt disturbed a press conference of the European Central Bank, jumping onto the table in front of ECB president Mario Draghi yelling "end the ECB dick-tatorship" [sic] and tossing confetti over Draghi. After being dragged out and briefly detained, Witt wrote on Twitter that the protest was not associated with FEMEN, and that she was a "freelance activist." Her protest was in opposition to the bank's policies, which she describes as "European neo-liberalism" and economic inequality. Speaking after her release, Witt said "The gap between the rich and the poor is bigger here [in Germany] than it's ever been before."

In 2018, Witt directed a play, "Ein bisschen Julia und Romeo" ("A Bit of Julia and Romeo"), which played for two nights at the Berlin Workers Theater in Berlin.

== Sources ==
- "Femen activists jailed in Tunisia retract apology". The Guardian. Associated Press. 27 June 2013.
- Berthold, Nicolas (27 December 2013). "'Meine Brüste schaden nur dem Patriarchat'". Rheinische Post (in German).
- Beucker, Pascal (26 December 2013). "Die auf den Altar sprang". Die Tageszeitung (in German).
- Connolly, Kate (16 April 2015). "ECB protestor Josephine Witt surprised by relaxed security measures". The Guardian.
- "Ein bisschen Julia und Romeo". bat-Studiotheater. 2018.
- Kerbusk, Simon; Piegsa, Oskar; Sartor, Annika (14 June 2013). "Wem hilft der Nacktprotest?". Zeit Campus (in German).
- Neumann, Julia (3 December 2014). "600 € per breast". Die Tageszeitung (in German).
- Reinbold, Fabian (25 April 2013). "'Sextremist Training: Climbing into the Ring with Femen". ABC News.
- Spence, Peter (16 April 2015). "Revealed: the protester who 'attacked' Mario Draghi". The Telegraph.
