= Religion in Egypt =

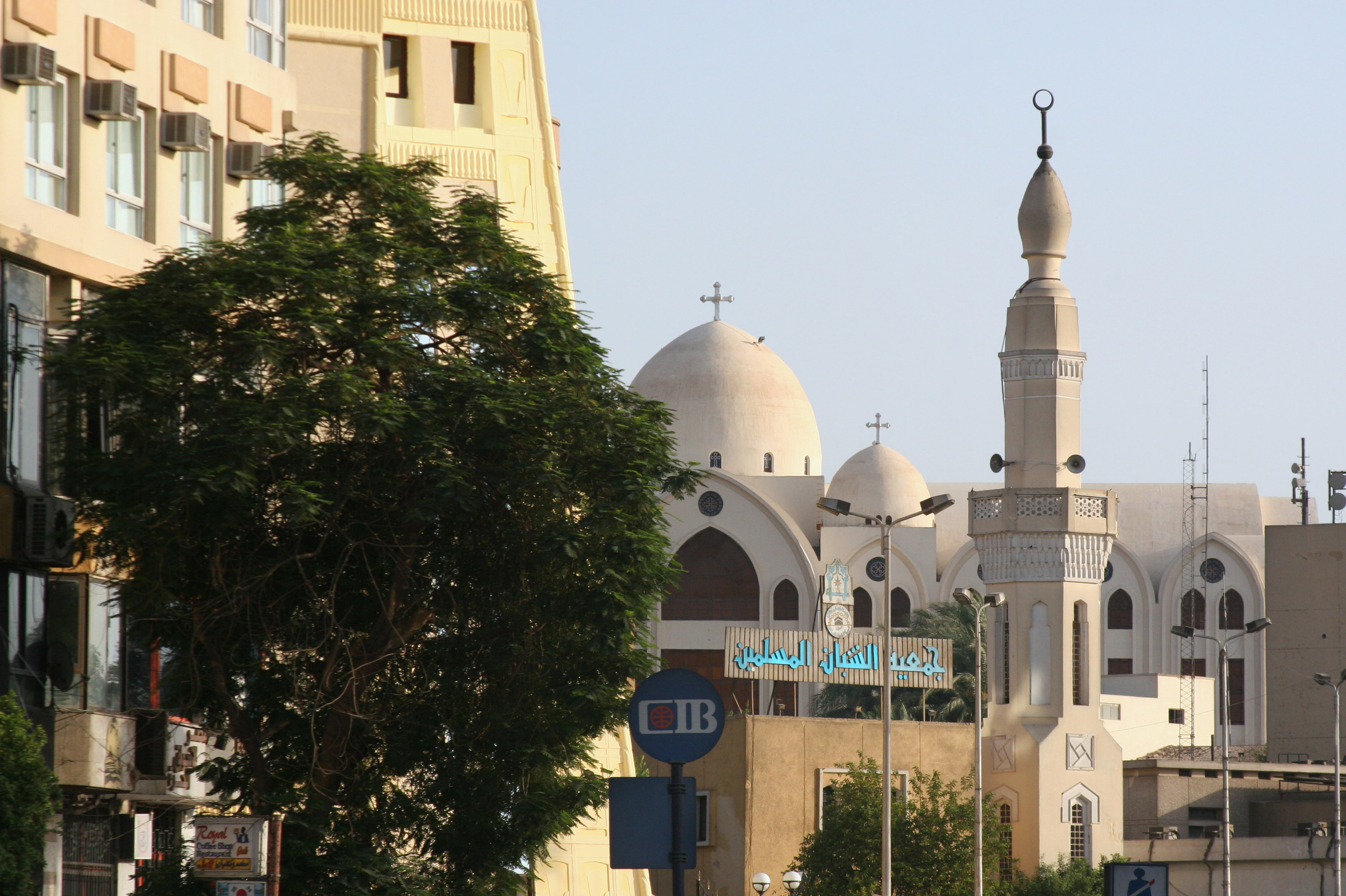
A common religious scene in Egypt: a mosque next to a church.

Religion in Egypt controls many aspects of social life and is endorsed by law. The state religion of Egypt is Islam, although estimates vary greatly in the absence of official statistics. Since the 2006 census, religion has been excluded, and thus available statistics are estimates made by religious and non-governmental agencies. The country is majority Sunni Muslim (estimated to be 85–95% of the population), with the next largest religious group being Coptic Orthodox Christians (with estimates ranging from 5 to 15% (Note: Numbers vary widely. The 1996 census, the last for which public info on religion exists has 5.6% of the population as Christian (down from 8.3% in 1927).: In 1997, the Washington Report on Middle East Affairs stated, "Estimates of the size of Egypt's Christian population vary from the low government figures of 6 to 7 million to the 12 million reported by some Christian leaders. The actual numbers may be in the 9 to 9.5 million range, out of an Egyptian population of more than 60 million" which yields an estimate of about 10–20% then.; In 2004, the Christian Post quoted the U.S. Copt Association as reporting 15% of the population as native Christian.; QScience Connect in 2013 using 2008 data estimated that 5.1% of Egyptians between the ages of 15 and 59 were Copts.; The Pew Foundation estimated 5.1% for Christians in 2010.; The CIA Fact Book estimated 10% Christians (2012).; According to Al-Ahram newspaper, one of the main government owned national newspapers in Egypt, estimated the percentage between 10% and 15% (2017).)). The exact numbers are subject to controversy, with Christians alleging that they have been systemically under-counted in existing censuses.

Religion in Egypt (2020, Pew Research Center)
1. Muslims (95.2%)
2. Christians (4.80%)

The history of religion in Egypt stretches over thousands of years, from ancient polytheism to Christianity and then Islam. Despite the customary division of Egyptian history into discrete eras, Ancient Egypt, Greco-Roman, and Islamic Egypt, strong threads of continuity run through Egypt's religious and cultural life. Many customs and beliefs practiced today, such as funerary laments, rural food traditions, and ideas about the afterlife, can be traced to ancient Egyptian origins, and having survived inside later religious identities. Even when new religions supplanted older ones, Egyptians frequently reinterpreted them through inherited cultural lenses, ensuring that the essence of their civilizational identity remained intact beneath outward transformations.

Egypt hosts two major religious institutions. Al-Azhar, founded in 970 CE by the Fatimids as the first Islamic university in Egypt and the Coptic Orthodox Church of Alexandria established in the middle of the 1st century by Saint Mark.

== History ==
=== Ancient Egypt ===
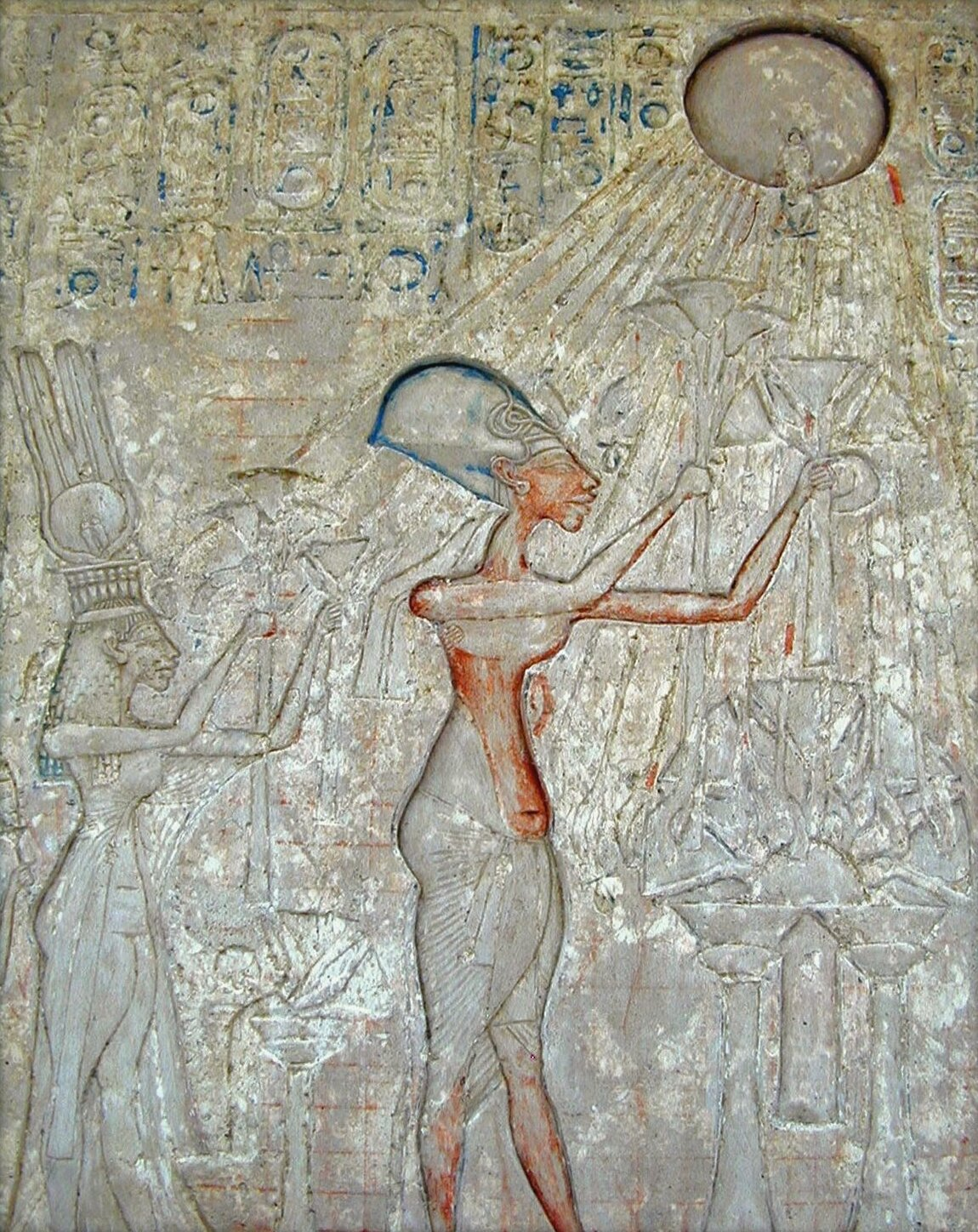
Akhenaten and his family worshipping the Aten.

Ancient Egyptian religion emerged in prehistory and its traditions remained vital for over three thousand years. While beliefs shifted across dynasties, it remained centered on a pantheon of deities tied to natural and cosmic forces. Some gods, such as Ra (often merged with Amun as Amun-Ra) and Isis, became especially prominent. During Akhenaten's reign in the 14th century BCE, a short-lived monotheism emerged, focusing on Aten.

Religion was integrated with the state, grounded in myth and ritual. The pharaoh, seen as semi-divine, acted as a bridge between gods and people, justifying massive state investment in temples and ceremonies. Alongside state religion, personal devotion flourished through prayer and offerings, especially as pharaonic authority weakened. Funerary practices were central, aimed at ensuring life after death through mummification, tomb goods, and offerings.

=== Greco-Roman Egypt ===
Though it endured through foreign rule under Persian, Greek, and Roman occupation, ancient Egyptian religion eventually declined with the rise of Christianity. Christianity arrived in the first century CE. According to tradition, Saint Mark founded the Church in Alexandria in 42 CE, beginning a patriarchal succession that continues today.

Roman persecution shaped a distinct Coptic tradition. The development of Christian monasticism in Egypt and the Christianising missionary activity of the Copts had influence well beyond the boundaries of Egypt.

By the fourth century, tensions with other centers of Christianity emerged. Most Egyptian Christians rejected the Council of Chalcedon's (451 CE) doctrine of two natures in Christ, adhering instead to miaphysitism, the doctrine of one united divine nature. By the sixth century, the Coptic Church had an independent hierarchy led by the Pope of Alexandria and a governing synod.

=== Islamic Egypt ===
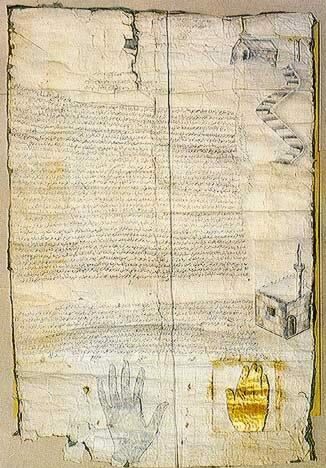
The Covenant of the Islamic Prophet Muhammad with the Christians of Saint Catherine's Monastery in Mount Sinai.

Islam was introduced to Egypt in the seventh century CE during the early Muslim conquests, initiating a profound religious transformation that would eventually make Egypt a major center of the Islamic world.

The conquest was led by Amr ibn al-As, a close companion of the Prophet Muhammad, completing the conquest of the country by 647 CE. Religious zeal, along with social and economic incentives, propelled expansion of Islam beyond the Arabian Peninsula.

Under Muslim rule, Christians and Jews were recognized as People of the Book and granted protected status as dhimmis. In return for this protection, they were required to pay a special tax called jizya which exempted them from military service. Though conversion was not forced, the proportion of Muslims increased steadily. By the ninth century CE, Islam had become the majority religion in Egypt.

In 969 CE, the Fatimid Caliphate, adherents of Ismailism, a branch of Shia Islam, conquered Egypt. Though they established mosques, institutions, and Al-Azhar University, one of the world's earliest universities, they failed to entrench Ismailism among the population. Internal sectarian conflict, combined with political instability, contributed to the reestablishment of Sunni Islam under the Ayyubid dynasty in 1171, led by Saladin.

The Mamluks, a military caste originally formed of enslaved soldiers under Ayyubid rule, eventually seized power and governed Egypt until the Ottoman conquest in 1517. Throughout these periods, Sunni Islam became entrenched as the dominant religious identity, with Al-Azhar emerging as a preeminent center of Sunni Islamic learning.

== Demographics ==
Egypt's religious composition is predominantly Muslim, with Christians representing the largest religious minority. According to Egypt's contested 2006 census, approximately 94.9% of Egyptians identified as Muslim, 5.1% as Christian, and less than 1% as adherents of other religions.

Census data since 1927 has recorded a steady decline in the Christian population, from 8.3% that year to 5.7% by 1996. However, these official figures have been widely disputed. Christian leaders and sources have long argued that they are undercounted in state statistics, with unofficial estimates ranging from 10% to 25% of the population. (Note: See:)

In 2017, Al Ahram and the Washington Institute for Near East Policy estimated the Christian population at 10–15%, (Note: See:) while international surveys have reported comparable results. Afrobarometer (2016) and Arab Barometer (2019) estimated the Christian population at 10.3% and 9.6%, respectively.

The CIA World Factbook similarly reported Egypt's population as approximately 90% Sunni Muslim and 10% Christian, an estimate echoed by the U.S. State Department and its Commission on International Religious Freedom, the UK Foreign and Commonwealth Office, and other international agencies. (Note: See:)

In 1998, Youssef Courbage, research director at the French National Institute for Demographic Studies (INED), and Philippe Fargues, a demographer, professor, and emeritus member of the European University Institute (EUI), defended the reliability of official statistics and argued that the Egyptian numbers are consistent both over the whole period and at each individual moment in time. They added that the Western press often accepts overestimates because it has difficulty acknowledging that a minority is a minority.

In 1999, Eric Denis, the Research Director at the French National Centre for Scientific Research (CNRS), studied the Egyptian census and compared it with the registration of births, marriages, and deaths in a random sample of census units, finding them to be consistent. He noted that the local-level data for more than 5,000 villages, towns, and cities remained consistent across 11 censuses. He stated that this could not be the product of a deliberate underestimation passed down over 100 years through generations of civil servants, and added that early estimates of the Christian population provoked no opposition, and were sometimes put forward by the Church itself. According to him, contestation emerged only in the 1970s, when Coptic activists began to use numbers to demand greater political representation. From then on, he stated, the Church and its supporters rejected census results, and proposed figures above 15 percent.

The majority of Muslims in Egypt are Sunni, with many affiliated with various Sufi orders. The Ahmadiyya community is estimated at around 50,000 individuals. Estimates of Egypt’s Shia population, including Twelvers and Ismailis, range from 800,000 to as many as two to three million individuals. (Note: See:)

Most Egyptian Christians belong to the Coptic Orthodox Church of Alexandria, an Oriental Orthodox denomination. (Note: See:) Other denominations include Armenian Apostolic, Catholic, Maronite, Anglican, and the Greek Orthodox Church of Alexandria, which has around 350,000 adherents. Church figures, including Pope Shenouda III of Alexandria and Bishop Morkos of Shubra, claimed in 2008 that the number of Orthodox Christians exceeded 12 million, with some estimates reaching 16 million. Protestant churches report a membership of approximately 300,000, and the Coptic Catholic Church is believed to have a comparable figure.

A small but historically notable Baháʼí community exists in Egypt, estimated in 2022 at between 1,000 and 2,000 members. The Jewish community, once numbering around 80,000 prior to the 1953 dissolution of the monarchy and subsequent exodus during the Arab–Israeli conflict, had declined to an estimated 13 individuals by 2014.

Public identification as atheist or agnostic varies but is generally rare due to the risk of legal repercussions and social stigmatization. The 2020 United States report on international religious freedom states that there are no reliable estimates for the number of atheists in Egypt.

== Freedom of religion ==
Article 64 of the Egyptian Constitution formally guarantees absolute freedom of belief and worship. In practice, however, this freedom is limited by state policies, legal constraints, and sectarian tensions. The constitution officially recognizes only Islam, Christianity, and Judaism, granting these faiths the right to public worship, while denying equivalent recognition to other religions.

In 2006, Egypt's Supreme Administrative Court reaffirmed this limitation, legally distinguishing the three "recognized" religions from all others, effectively delegitimizing non-Abrahamic faiths. As a result, members of unrecognized religions were denied essential documents unless they either omitted or falsified their religious identity. A 2008 court ruling allowed adherents of unrecognized faiths to obtain identification documents by leaving the religion field blank.

Conversion between religions is legally complex and asymmetrical. Conversion to Islam is generally permitted without difficulty, whereas individuals converting from Islam to another faith, particularly Christianity, face serious bureaucratic and legal hurdles, including the risk of being prosecuted for document fraud. The Coptic Orthodox Church has expressed concern over this imbalance, citing systemic pressures encouraging conversion to Islam. Authorities have cited national security and potential social unrest as justifications for detaining converts from Islam.

In 2007, a Cairo court denied 45 individuals the right to re-identify as Christian after having previously converted to Islam. This ruling was overturned in 2008 by the Supreme Administrative Court, which allowed 12 individuals to amend their religious status, although the new documents indicated their temporary conversion to Islam.

According to a 2010 Pew Research Center poll, 84 percent of Egyptian Muslims surveyed supported the death penalty for apostasy from Islam.

Under Egypt's personal status law, Muslim men are legally permitted to marry non-Muslim women. However, non-Muslim men are not allowed to marry Muslim women.

A 2020 report by the Pew Research Center ranked Egypt among the top five out of 25 countries for high levels of social hostilities involving religion. Although the 2021 U.S. State Department report noted government efforts to curb sectarian violence, including the execution of the perpetrator who murdered Christian priest Samaan Shehata, problems remain. As of 2022, Freedom House gave Egypt a score of 2 out of 4 for religious freedom, and a total of 21 out of 100 for political rights and civil liberties.

=== Situation of Christians ===
Coptic Christians, Egypt's largest religious minority, have faced persistent legal and social discrimination, particularly following the 1952 coup led by Gamal Abdel Nasser. Until 2005, presidential approval was required even for minor church repairs. Although this restriction was transferred to governors, significant bureaucratic hurdles remain, and discrimination continues to be more pronounced for churches than for mosques.

Although Muslims and Christians share a national identity, sectarian violence has periodically erupted. Major incidents include the 2000–2001 Kosheh massacres, which resulted in 21 deaths, attacks on churches in 2006, the 2010 Nag Hammadi massacre, and the 2011 Alexandria bombing which killed 21 people.

In 2002, during the presidency of Hosni Mubarak, the government officially recognized Coptic Christmas (January 7) as a national holiday. Nonetheless, Christian citizens reportedly remain underrepresented in key areas such as law enforcement, national security, and public office, and have raised concerns regarding workplace discrimination based on religious identity.

In 2013, the Christian nonprofit organization Open Doors ranked Egypt 25th out of 50 countries on its World Watch List of nations where Christians face the highest levels of persecution. By 2026, Egypt had fallen to 42th place, reflecting an improvement. It ranked among the least dangerous countries in the region for Christians, following Jordan and Qatar.

== Religions in Egypt ==
=== Religiosity ===
Surveys conducted in recent years reflect shifting trends in religious identification. According to the 2018 Arab Barometer Wave V survey, approximately 11% of Egyptians identified as not religious, with 20% of youth respondents describing themselves as such. In the same Arab Barometer 2018 Wave V survey, 90.4% were Muslim, 9.6% were Christian, and 0.1% had no religion.

However, the 2021–2022 Arab Barometer survey reported a resurgence in religious identification, with 95% of Egyptians describing themselves as religious or somewhat religious, a 6% increase from the 2018 figures.

=== Recognized religions ===
==== Islam ====
The Muhammad Ali Mosque, located within the Cairo Citadel. A prominent example of Ottoman-style architecture and a major historical landmark built in the 19th century.

Islam has been the state religion of Egypt since the 1980 constitutional amendment to Article 2; prior to that, Egypt was officially recognized as a secular state. According to the constitution of Egypt, all new legislation must at least implicitly align with Islamic law.

The majority of Egyptian Muslims adhere to Sunni Islam, predominantly following the Hanafi school, which is administered by the state through the Ministry of Religious Endowments, often referred to as El Awqaf (الأوقاف). This ministry oversees all mosques and supervises Muslim clerics across the country. It also trains Imams in vocational institutions and at Al-Azhar University, and maintains commissions authorized to issue fatwas on religious matters. Although the Hanafi school remains dominant, elements of the Shafi'i and Maliki schools are also present and occasionally intermixed.

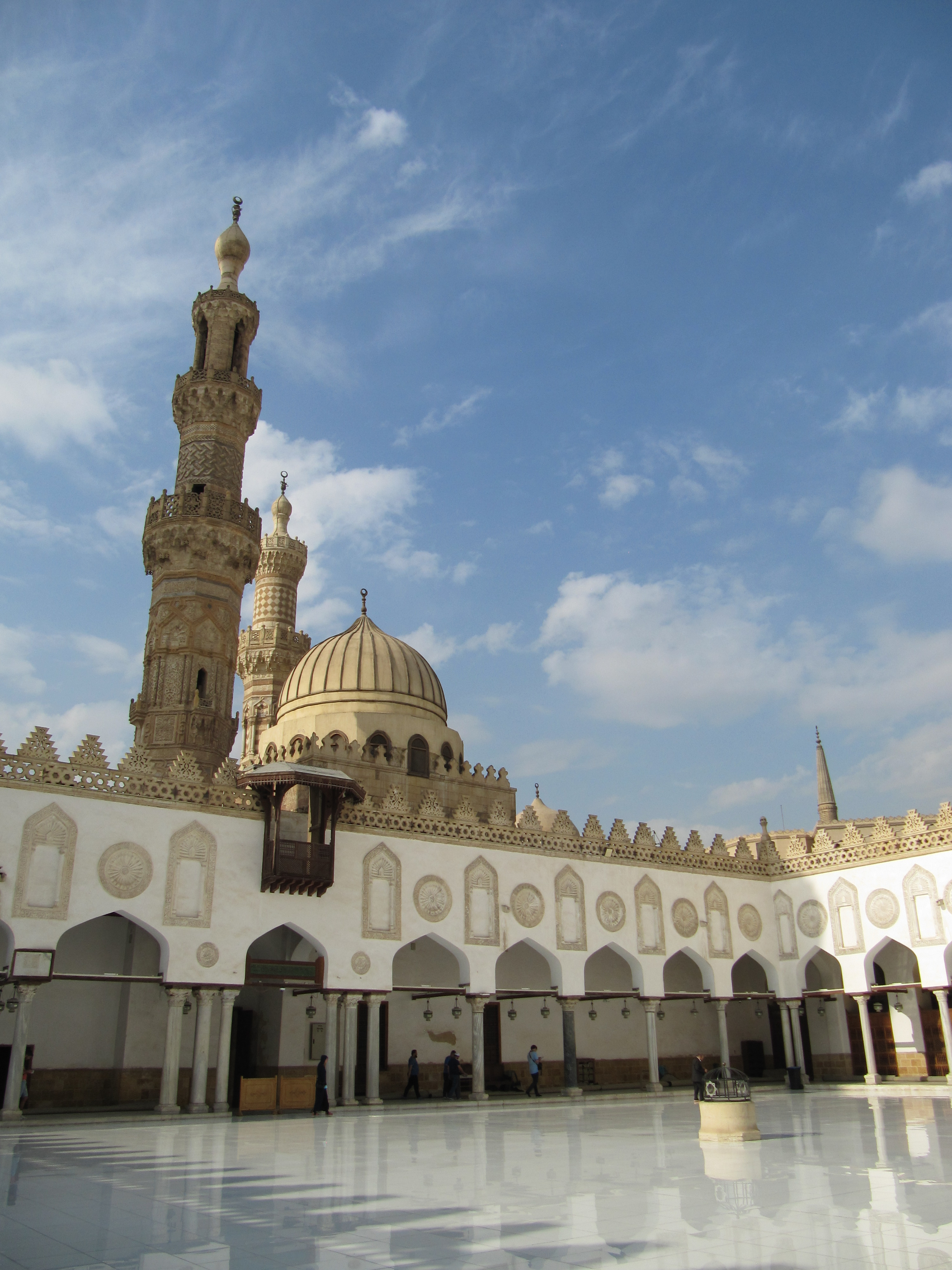
Al-Azhar Mosque founded in 970 by the Fatimids as the first Islamic university in Egypt

A significant number of Sunni Muslims in Egypt are affiliated with native Sufi orders. Sufism has been present since the early days of Islam in Egypt and continues to flourish, particularly in rural areas. Theological elites, especially those associated with Al-Azhar University, the preeminent Sunni institution globally and one of the world’s oldest universities, founded circa 970 CE.

The Fatimid Caliphate, a Shia Ismaili dynasty, established Cairo as its capital and made Egypt the heart of its empire. Today, Shia Muslims in Egypt are a small minority, estimated by scholars to represent around 1% of the population, though figures range between 800,000 and 2 million. This includes adherents of both Twelver and Ismaili branches. There are also minor populations of Mu'tazila, Dawoodi Bohra, and Ahmadi Muslims, along with a number of expatriates affiliated with other sects.

Religious practice and identity in Egypt varies, with theologians from Al-Azhar tending to promote orthodox interpretations of Islam, while popular preachers and rural populations often adopt Sufi-influenced practices. Among the urban middle and upper classes, religious expression is frequently seen either as a private matter or as a principle that should shape public life. Islamic revival movements, spanning different social classes, have been present in cities and villages for decades, reflecting the dynamic and diverse role of religion in Egyptian society.

==== Christianity ====
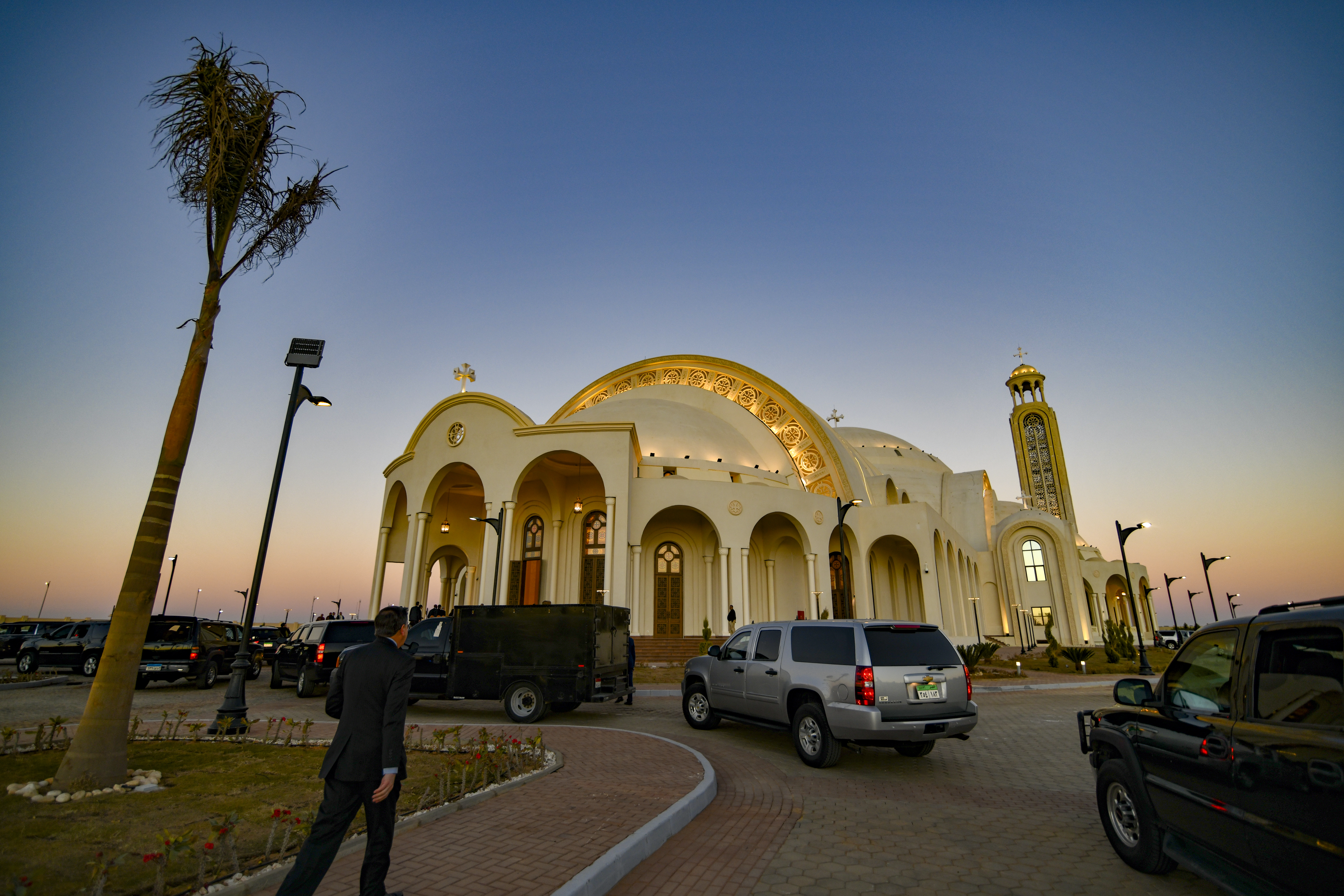
The Cathedral of the Nativity of Christ, located in Egypt's new capital, is the largest church in the Middle East and the largest Oriental Orthodox church in the world by area. It also serves as the seat of the papal headquarters.

The Coptic Christian population in Egypt constitutes the largest Christian community in both the Middle East and North Africa, estimated to comprise between 5% and 15% of Egypt's population depending on the source. Approximately 95% of Egyptian Christians belong to the Coptic Orthodox Church of Alexandria, an Oriental Orthodox church headed by the Pope of the Coptic Orthodox Church. The Church, traditionally believed to have been founded in the 1st century CE by Saint Mark, is a cornerstone of Egypt’s enduring Christian heritage.

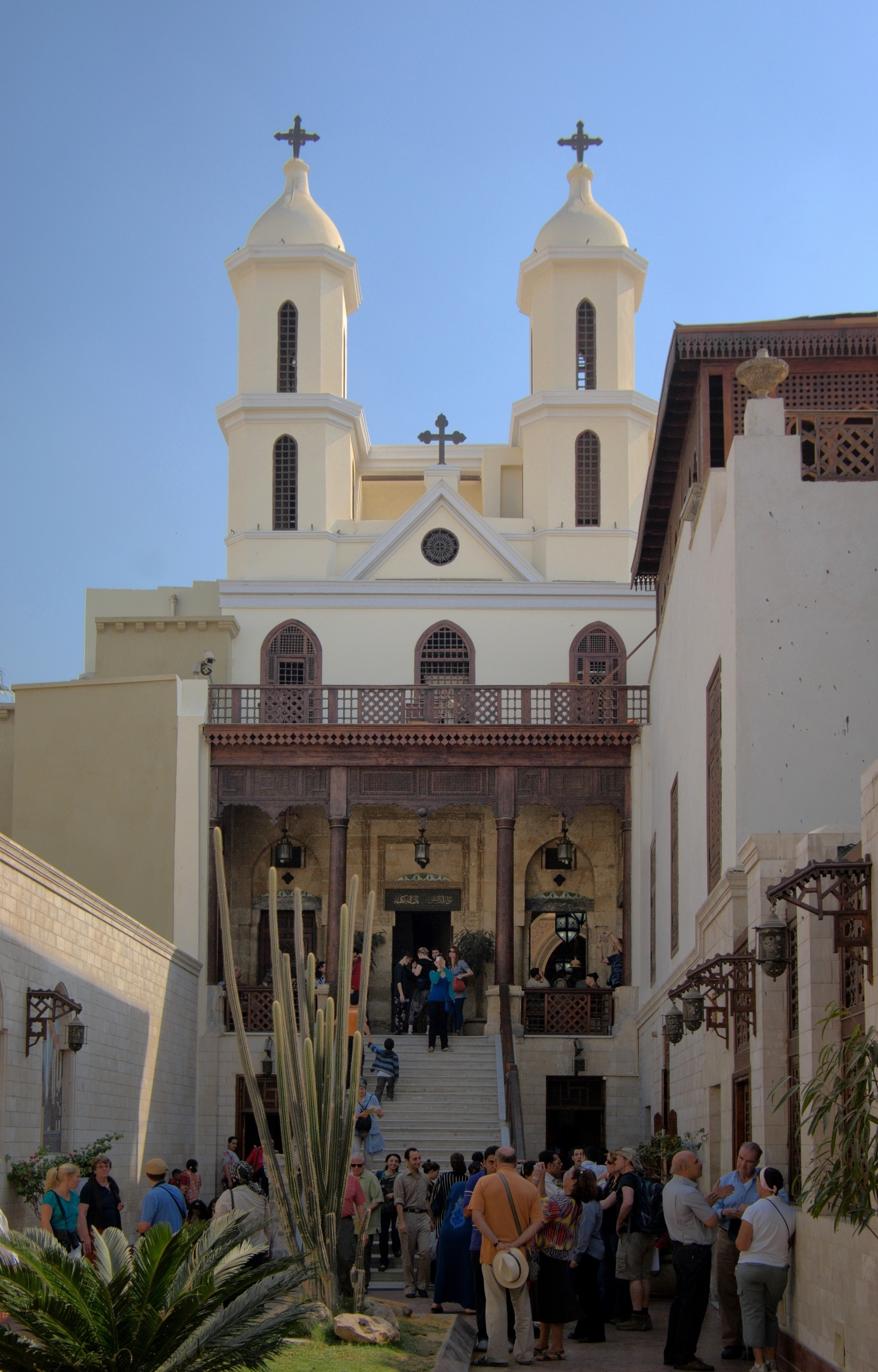
The Hanging Church of Cairo, built in the 3rd or 4th century CE, is one of the most famous Coptic churches in Egypt.

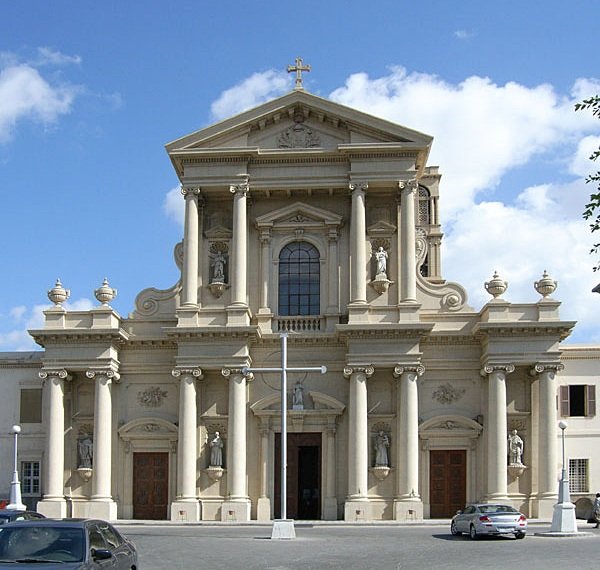
St. Catherine's Cathedral, a Catholic church located in Alexandria

In addition to the Coptic Orthodox Church, Egypt is home to a wide array of Christian communities, both native and expatriate. These include members of the Coptic Catholic Church, Protestant denominations, and various Eastern and Western churches concentrated in urban centers such as Cairo and Alexandria.

The following table provides an overview of the various Apostolic, Catholic, and Orthodox churches present in Egypt, apart from the Coptic Orthodox Church of Alexandria:

Church	Estimated adherents	Notes
Coptic Catholic Church	~210,000	An Eastern Catholic Church in communion with the Pope in Rome; led by Ibrahim Isaac Sidrak.
Greek Orthodox Church of Alexandria	~350,000	Also 1.5 million adherents across Africa; led by Patriarch Theodore II.
Melkite Greek Catholic Church	~7,000	Has up to 50,000 expatriates globally; administered by a Protosyncellus.
Armenian Apostolic Church	~7,000	Most follow the Holy See of Echmiadzin rather than the Holy See of Cilicia.
Latin Church	~7,000	Primarily of foreign descent; native Egyptian adherents are few and mostly through intermarriage.
Maronite Church	~5,000	An Eastern Catholic Church based in Lebanon.
Armenian Catholic Church	~1,200	Minority Armenian community.
Chaldean Catholic Church	~500	Originating in Iraq.
Syriac Catholic Church	~2,000	Another Eastern Catholic rite.
Syriac Orthodox Church	450–500	Mostly students at the Catechetical School of Alexandria or foreign students at Egyptian universities.

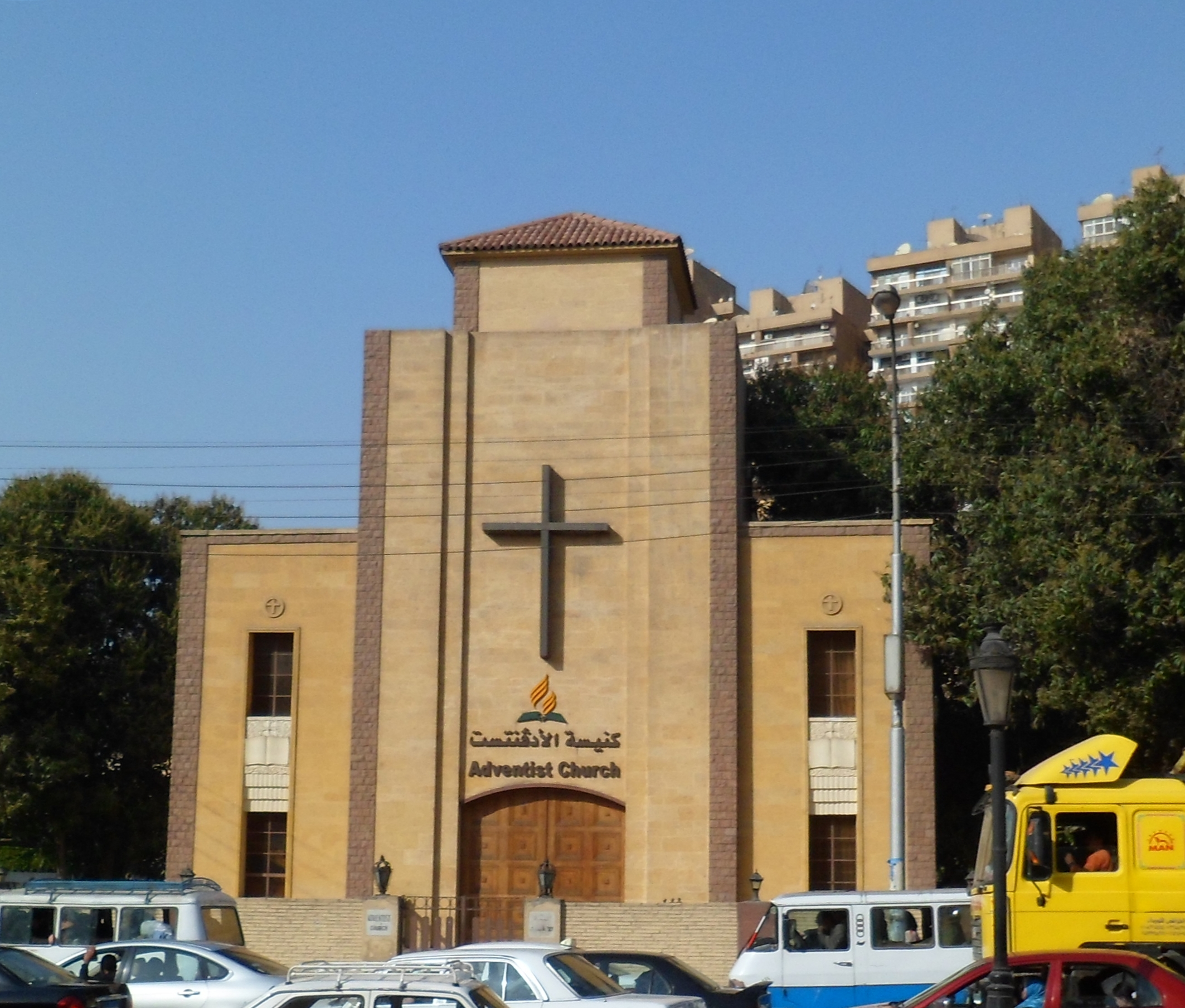
A Seventh-day Adventist church located in Cairo.

The following table provides an overview of the various Protestant denominations active in Egypt:

Church	Estimated adherents
Evangelical Church of Egypt (Synod of the Nile)	~140,000
Assemblies of God	~40,000
Free Methodist Church	~10,000
Episcopal/Anglican Province of Alexandria	10,000–15,000
Christian Brethren Church	~5,000
Pentecostal Church of God	~3,500
Pentecostal Holiness Church	~1,400
Church of God of Prophecy	~1,100
Seventh-day Adventist Church	852

==== Judaism ====
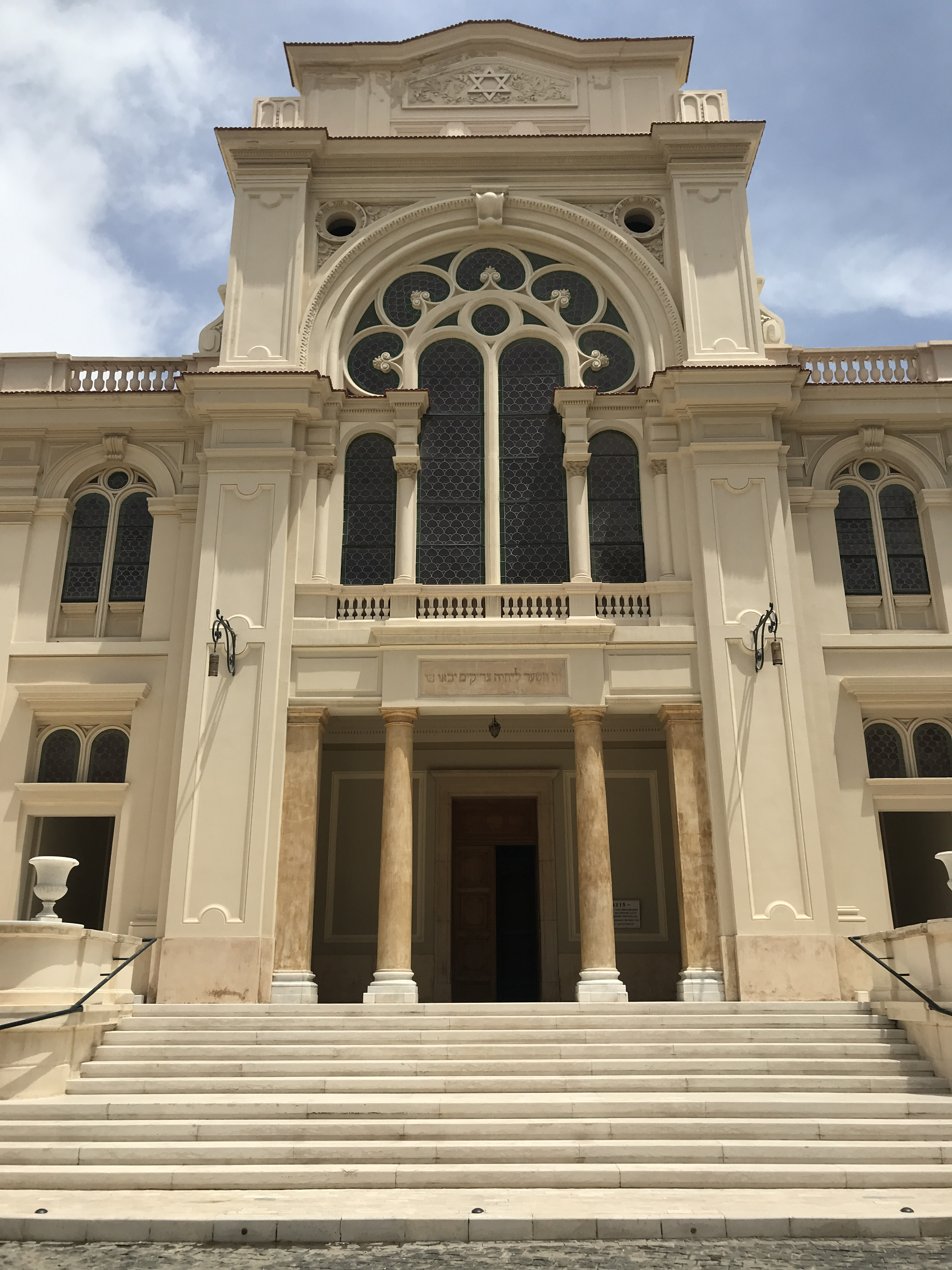
The Eliyahu Hanavi Synagogue, located in Alexandria.

Prior to 1956, Egypt was home to a thriving Jewish community. According to the 1948 census, there were 65,639 Jews in Egypt, including adherents of Karaite tradition. Egyptian Jews were deeply integrated into the country's social, economic, and political life. Among them were prominent figures such as the nationalist writer and satirist Yaqub Sanu (Abu Naddara), composer Dawoud Husni, celebrated singer Leila Mourad, and pioneering filmmaker Togo Mizrahi.

Throughout the 19th and early 20th centuries, Jews from across the Ottoman Empire and Europe were drawn to Egypt by the comparatively tolerant religious environment that prevailed at the time. However, this climate changed drastically following the 1956 Suez Crisis, when President Gamal Abdel Nasser initiated the mass expulsion of Jews. Many were stripped of their Egyptian citizenship, and their properties were seized. This marked the beginning of a steady wave of Jewish emigration from Egypt, which intensified further after the Six-Day War in 1967.

By mid-2016, only six Jews remained in Cairo, all women over the age of 65, including their spiritual leader, Magda Tania Haroun. An additional twelve Jews resided in Alexandria, where their spiritual leader was Ben Youssef Gaon. As of 2021, estimates suggest that fewer than 20 Jews remain in Egypt.

=== Unrecognized religions and beliefs ===
==== Ahmadiyya Islam ====
The Ahmadiyya community in Egypt is estimated to number between 7,000 and 50,000 adherents. The movement was established in Egypt in 1922, but has faced increased repression and societal hostility in the 21st century.

The Al-Azhar University, Egypt's most influential Sunni institution, has officially denounced the Ahmadiyya movement, labeling its doctrines as heretical. Egyptian authorities have periodically detained members of the community under blasphemy and defamation laws that target religious minorities or sects deemed to deviate from mainstream Islam.

On 15 March 2010, nine Ahmadis were arrested on charges related to their religious affiliation. These arrests drew condemnation from Egyptian and international human rights organizations, which criticized the use of the emergency law to suppress religious expression.

==== Baháʼí Faith ====
Informal estimates put the Baháʼí population at about 2,000 in 2006, though other estimates go as high as 6,900 adherents in 2010.

In 1925, Egypt became the first Muslim country to legally recognize the Baháʼí Faith as an independent religion distinct from Islam. The state-sanctioned persecution of Baháʼís began after the 1953 dissolution of the monarchy, and culminated in Law 263 in 1960, which banned all Baháʼí institutions and community activities in Egypt. According to reports in 2006, Baháʼís had difficulty obtaining documents from government authorities, and because police regularly detained people without correct documents, some stayed at home to avoid arrest.

Because their faith is not officially recognized by the state, Baháʼís could not record it on their national identity cards. Without valid identity cards they struggle to register their children in school, open bank accounts, and start businesses. On 16 December 2006, after only one hearing, the High Court of Egypt ruled against the Baháʼís, holding that the government would not recognize their religion on official identification cards. That left them unable to obtain ID cards, birth certificates, or death certificates.

However, on January 29, 2008, Cairo's court of Administrative Justice, ruling on two related court cases, ruled in favour of the Baháʼís, allowing them to obtain birth certificates and identification documents, so long as they omit their religion on court documents. The ruling accepted the compromise solution offered by the Baháʼís, allowing for them to obtain identification papers without the Baháʼí Faith being officially recognized.

Tensions remained high during the 2011 Egyptian revolution, including homes being burnt, leading Baháʼí leaders to appeal for public dialogue.

==== Atheism, agnosticism, and irreligion ====
It is difficult to quantify the number of atheist or agnostic Egyptians, due to persecution by the religious establishments, the resulting social stigma against identifying publicly as non-religious, and a lack of official statistics.

People who make public statements deemed critical of Islam or Christianity can be tried under the country's blasphemy law. Outspoken atheists like Alber Saber and Kareem Amer have been convicted under this law. In 2000, an openly atheist Egyptian writer who called for a local association for atheists was tried on charges of insulting Islam in four of his books.

According to the 2020 US report on international religious freedom, there are no reliable estimates of the number of atheists in Egypt. A study at the University of Kent, citing a 2018 survey, Wave V by Arab Barometer, found that around 11% of Egyptians identified as not religious. About 20% of young Egyptians described themselves as not religious. In the same survey, 90.4% were Muslim, 9.6% were Christian, and 0.1% had no religion. According to a 2023 report by Arab Barometer, the percentage of Egyptians identifying as non-religious has decreased by 6% in the 2021–2022 survey compared to the 2018 Wave V survey. In that survey, 95% identified as either religious or somewhat religious.

A 2017 US State Department report says the number is rising. Since 2011, Egyptian media has reported more nonbelievers and atheists coming out publicly, however, atheism or skepticism is not a recent phenomenon in Egypt. More young Egyptians are saying publicly that they have left the faith, especially online. Many irreligious and atheist Egyptian intellectuals encourage them to speak up and come out of the closet. This trend is visible among both Muslims and Christians, and among both men and women.

Egyptian law and policy protect religious freedom but punish anyone who ridicules or insults the Abrahamic religions in speech or writing. Insulting other faiths, such as Buddhism or Hinduism, is not punishable. Atheists and irreligious people cannot change their official religious status, so they are counted as followers of their parents' religion, whether Islam or Christianity.

In January 2018, the head of the parliament's religious committee, Amr Hamroush, proposed a bill to make atheism illegal, stating that "it [atheism] must be criminalised and categorised as contempt of religion because atheists have no doctrine and try to insult the Abrahamic religions". In 2014, the Ministry of Youth and the Ministry of Awqaf announced a joint strategy to combat the spread of what they categorized as "harmful ideas" among the nation's youth, including atheism. Despite hostility towards them, atheists in Egypt have become increasingly vocal online, particularly after the ouster of Morsi in 2013.

== See also ==
- Christianity in Egypt
- Coptic Orthodox Church
- Catholic Church in Egypt
- Kemetism
- Protestantism in Egypt
- List of Coptic Churches in Egypt
- Ancient Egyptian religion
