= Alber Saber =

Egyptian computer science student and blogger (born c. 1985)

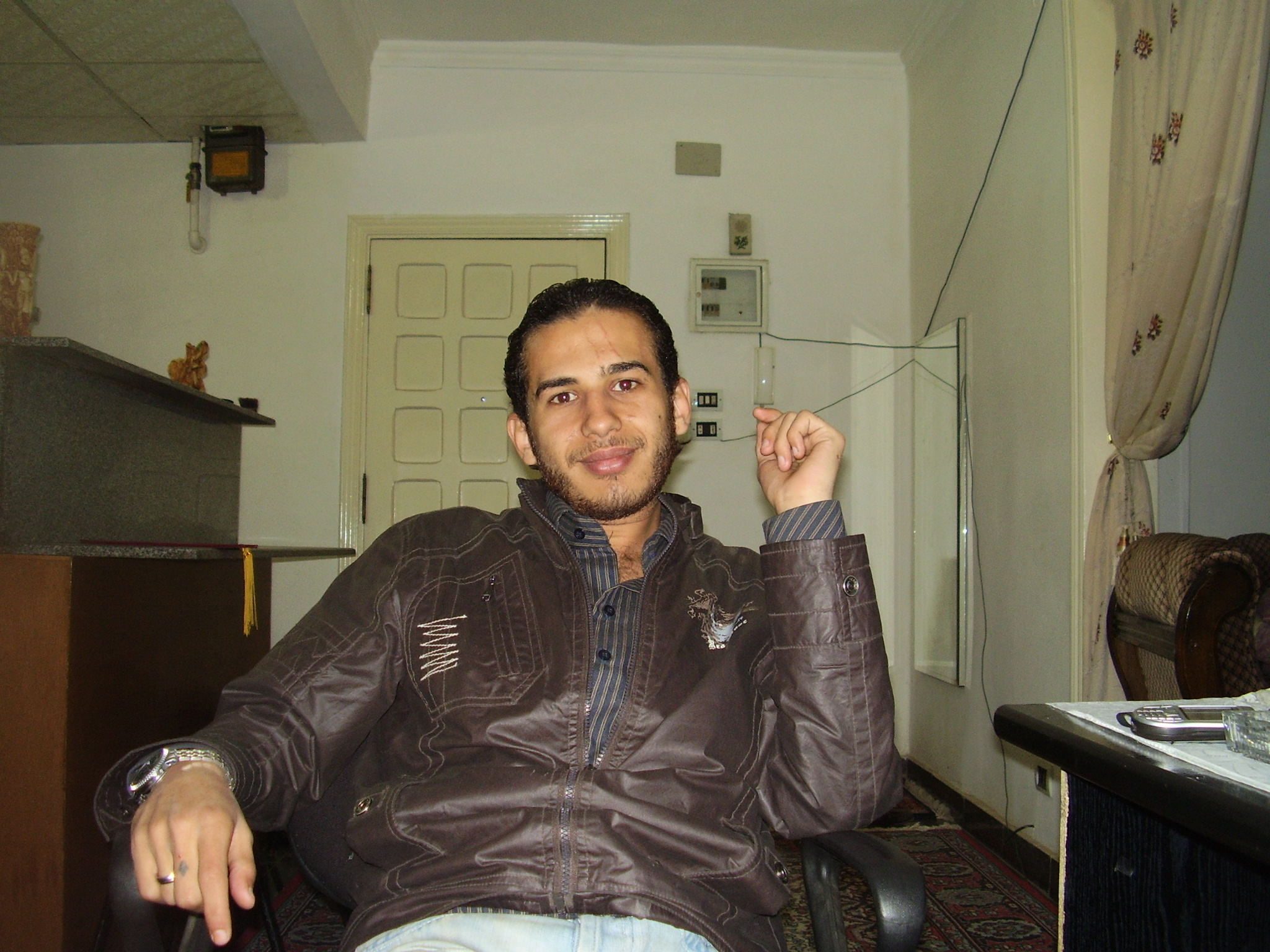
Alber Saber Ayad

Alber Saber Ayad (Arabic: ألبير صابر عياد, IPA: [ʔælˈbeːɾ ˈsˤɑːbeɾ ʕæjˈjæːd], also spelled Albert; born c. 1985) is an Egyptian computer science student and blogger who was arrested on 13 September 2012 on allegations of having shared the YouTube trailer for the anti-Islam film Innocence of Muslims on his Facebook page. While he was raised in a Coptic Christian family, he is now an atheist.

== Arrest ==
On 11 September 2012, a large protest took place at the US Embassy in Cairo against Innocence of Muslims, which had been created by an Egyptian Coptic Christian living in the US. On 12 September, Alber Saber's home was surrounded by a crowd calling for his death for heresy and atheism. The crowd attempted to break down the door, and also threatened to burn down the house. Saber's mother called the police for protection, and Saber was arrested by them the following day. Saber later stated that a police officer incited other prisoners to attack him in detention; he was beaten and cut on the neck with a razor. According to Amnesty International, Saber's home, where his mother and sister also live, continues to be the scene of angry protests.

Police confiscated Saber's computer, but found no evidence that he had uploaded the video in question. Instead, Saber was charged with "defamation of Islam and Christianity, insulting the divine and satirizing religious rituals and sanctities and the prophets under articles 98, 160 and 161 of the Egyptian Penal Code", with a maximum sentence of six years' imprisonment. The prosecution stated that Saber had "promoted his extremist thoughts in speech and writings by creating web pages, including [the] 'Crazy dictator' and 'Egyptian atheists' [pages]." In a hearing on Saber's initial detention, a prosecutor told the court that Saber had insulted Muhammad, Jesus, Mary, Gabriel, and "God himself." Saber's lawyers stated that Saber did not post the video and is innocent of the charges. One of his lawyers described the case as simply "a way to defuse the people's anger".

Reuters described the case as raising "concerns over freedom of expression". The case also drew protest from several NGOs. Amnesty International designated Saber a prisoner of conscience, "detained solely for peacefully exercising his right to freedom of expression", and called for his protection and immediate release. Reporters Without Borders condemned the arrest as "censorship". Eight human rights organizations filed a complaint on Saber's behalf demanding that his torture allegations be investigated.

== Trial and sentence ==
On 12 December 2012, Saber was found guilty and sentenced to three years' imprisonment. He was allowed to appeal if he first paid $167 bail. Though the bail was paid, police returned him to prison. Amnesty International condemned the sentence as "an outrageous assault on freedom of expression".

== Appeal and flight from Egypt ==
On 26 January 2013, Saber was released for an appeal session and subsequently left Egypt.
