= Blasphemy law in Egypt =

The main blasphemy law in Egypt is Article 98(f) of the Egyptian Penal Code. It penalizes: "whoever exploits and uses the religion in advocating and propagating by talk or in writing, or by any other method, extremist thoughts with the aim of instigating sedition and division or disdaining and contempting any of the heavenly religions or the sects belonging thereto, or prejudicing national unity or social peace."

The blasphemy laws have frequently been invoked against religious minorities such as Coptic Christians, as well as Islamic sects viewed as heretical by mainstream Sunni Muslims and atheists. In 1981, during the El Zawya El Hamra religious strife, the Egyptian penal code was amended to prohibit the "insulting of religions." The law was supposedly enacted to protect religious minorities. However, many believe that the law is now being abused.

== The constitution ==
According to the Constitution of Egypt, the state religion is Islam. The main source of legislation is Islamic jurisprudence. By the Constitution and the 1981 Education Act, "religious education" is compulsory in public and private schools. A "religious education" requires that all students be taught verses from the Quran. At the age of fifteen, every Egyptian must obtain an Identity Card. The card states one's religion as Muslim, Christian, or "other". The card is necessary for most services including banking, schooling, and medical treatment.

== The court system ==
Egypt has three levels of ordinary criminal courts: the primary, the appeals court, and the Court of Cassation. Besides the ordinary criminal court, Egypt has an Emergency State Security Court to hear cases about national security, and military tribunals to conduct hearings about terrorism and national security as well as military matters.

== Martial law ==
Since 1981, Egypt has had an Emergency Law, which is renewable every two years. In May 2010, the Egyptian government extended the Emergency Law to May 2012. The Emergency Law gives authorities the power to restrict many human rights, including freedom of religion or belief as well as freedom of expression, assembly, and association. Under the Emergency Law, the security forces arbitrarily arrest and detain persons, mistreat them, and torture them. In 1993, the Supreme Constitutional Court ruled that the President may invoke the Emergency Law to refer any crime to an Emergency or military court. The result of the Court's ruling is that crimes regarding religious matters are often found not in the ordinary criminal courts but in other courts. Egyptian and international human rights groups assert that the primary purpose of the Emergency State Security Court and the military courts is to punish political activism and dissent, and to persecute individuals who have unorthodox beliefs or practices. In the Emergency or military courts, the accused has no right of appeal but the sentence is subject to confirmation by the President. The President may substitute his decision for a decision by an Emergency or a military court.

== Blasphemy law ==
Article 98(f) of the Penal Code, as amended by Law 147/2006 states the penalty for blasphemy and similar crimes:

Confinement for a period of not less than six months and not exceeding five years, or a fine of not less than five hundred pounds and not exceeding one thousand pounds shall be the penalty inflicted on whoever makes use of religion in propagating, either by words, in writing, or in any other means, extreme ideas for the purpose of inciting strife, ridiculing or insulting a heavenly religion or a sect following it, or damaging national unity.

The "heavenly" religions are Judaism, Christianity, and Islam. Sometimes, in place of, or in addition to, blasphemy, the courts hold an accused guilty of "incitement to hate Muslims," "defaming the President of the Republic," and "insulting Islam."

Other parts of the Egyptian Penal Code address "various forms of religious insult".

- Article 160 punishes the destruction, vandalism, or desecration of religious buildings, sites, symbols, cemeteries, and graves, as well as the hindering of religious ceremonies.
- Article 161 prohibits the printing and dissemination of deliberately distorted religious texts for state-approved religions (Islam, Christianity, and Judaism), and also criminalizes the mocking or ridicule of religious ceremonies in public.20
- Article 176 punishes public incitement and holding a religious community in hatred or contempt.21 And
- Article 178 provides up to two years of imprisonment for possession, distribution, or manufacturing of documents in violation of "public morals", though that term is not defined.

By Articles 89 and 110 of decree law 78, all Egyptians have the right to file lawsuits against those who have transgressed an exalted right of God. In 1996 or 1998, an amendment to the law required these so-called "hisba cases" to be initiated by the general prosecutor. Those most frequently accused of "insulting Islam" are scholars, publishers, bloggers, human rights activists, political commentators, novelists, education reformers, professors, theologians, artists, filmmakers, politicians, Muslim liberals and dissidents, members of disfavored religious groups, converts to Christianity, and members of faiths that originated after Islam.

From 1985, Al-Azhar University's Islamic Research Council (IRC) has been an active advisor to the government on religious matters. Publishing a religious book without the IRC's approval is prohibited. The IRC has accused many writers of being blasphemous. The IRC has succeeded in having banned or censored many writings and other forms of expression. On 1 June 2004, Minister of Justice Faruq Seif al-Nasr gave clerics from Al-Azhar University authority to confiscate books and audio and videotapes that they believe violate Islamic precepts.

Human Rights Watch notes that the fear of being accused of blasphemy or of insulting Islam has obliged writers in Egypt to censor themselves and has obliged academics to do without intellectual freedom. Find below the case of Nasr Abu Zayd. In May 1998, Didier Monciaud, an instructor from France at the American University in Cairo, learned through the press that his use of Maxime Rodinson's biography Muhammad gave offense to the parents of some of his students. President Mubarak ordered that the biography be banned. The University did not renew Monciaud's contract. In 2008, the government proposed to enact laws that would prohibit journalists from saying or doing anything that disturbed "social peace", "national unity", "public order", or "public values".

== Selected cases ==
=== 2015 ===
In April 2015, Islam al-Behairy, a Muslim scholar and the host of With Islam on Al-Kahera Wel Nas, used his program to call for reforming Islam, a message Al-Azhar University condemned as an insult to Islam. Al Kahera suspended his program indefinitely. He was arrested, charged with insulting Islam, convicted, and sentenced to five years in prison. Al-Behairy appealed the sentence but a court rejected the appeal in October. However, in December, a court reduced his sentence to one year in jail., he was later pardoned by the President of Egypt, Abdel Fattah el-Sisi.

=== 2014 ===
On 16 June 2014, Demiana Emad, a 23-year-old teacher in Luxor was imprisoned for 6 months. It was charged that she had claimed that Pope Shenouda was better than Mohammed, a claim that was flatly denied by the director of the school.

On 21 October 2014, ex-Muslim atheist activist Ahmed Harqan (or Harkan) featured in a debate on the popular Egyptian talk show Taht al Koubry ("Under the Bridge"). He explained why he had become an atheist and said that Islam is a "harsh religion," which was being implemented by Islamic State (ISIS) and Boko Haram. They are doing "what the Prophet Muhammad and his companions did," said Harqan. Four days later, in the evening of 25 October, he and his pregnant wife Nada Mandour (Saly) Harqan (also an atheist) were attacked by a lynch mob, and escaped assassination by fleeing to a nearby police station. Instead of taking action to help Harqan and his wife, the police officers further assaulted them and they were imprisoned, charged with blasphemy and "defamation of religion" under article 98 in the Egyptian penal code for asking "What has ISIS done that Muhammad did not do?” on the talk show. Harqan's appearance provoked weeks of outcry from Islamic religious broadcasters and prompted much-watched follow-up shows. Harkan's lawyer was humiliated and kicked out of the police station. Eventually, Ahmed and Saly Harkan and their friend Kareem Jimy were released, and charges against them were dropped.

=== 2012 ===
In November 2012, seven Egyptian Christians were reportedly sentenced to death in absentia for their role in the anti-Mohammad movie Innocence of Muslims. Blasphemy is, however, not a capital crime in Egypt as the highest possible sentence under the blasphemy law is five years in prison.

In 2012, the authorities arrested two Coptic Christian children (aged 9 and 10) for allegedly tearing pages of the Quran.

=== 2010 ===
In March 2010, the authorities arrested nine Ahmadiyya for insulting Islam.

=== 2009 ===
In April 2009, an Egyptian court cancelled the publishing license of a monthly magazine Ibdaa because, in 2007, it had published a "blasphemous" poem: "On the balcony of Leila Murad" by Hilmi (or Helmi or Helmy) Salem. The court said the poem included "expressions that insulted God." Before Ibdaa was shut down, a court forced Salem to return a State Award for Achievement in the Arts. Salem had received the award for his entire body of work. The court held that "The sin that he committed ... against God and against society, challenging its traditions and religious beliefs should fail the sum total of his work, rendering him ineligible for any state honor or prize."

=== 2008 ===
In October 2008, the authorities arrested a blogger, Reda Abdel Rahman, who was affiliated with a religious group: the Quranist movement. Rahman's blog called for political and religious reform in Egypt. The authorities charged Rahman with "insulting Islam." Rahman spent nearly three months in detention. He complained about being physically abused. He was released in January 2009.

=== 2007 ===
In 2007, Egyptian police arrested Adel Fawzy Faltas and Peter Ezzat, who work for the Canada-based Middle East Christian Association, on the grounds that, in seeking to defend human rights, they had "insulted Islam".

=== 2005 ===
On 6 April 2005, Egyptian authorities arrested Bahaa el-Din Ahmed Hussein Mohammed El-Akkad. The authorities insinuated that El-Akkad had committed blasphemy but did not specify his crime. An engineer by profession, El-Akkad became a sheikh (a Muslim religious leader) during more than twenty years as a member of a fundamentalist Islamic group: Tabligh and Da’wah. The group was active in proselytizing non-Muslims but strictly opposed violence. El-Akkad has written two books, Islam: the Religion, and Islam and Terrorism. The second work, completed in 2005, argues for love, peace, and understanding in an Islamic context.

In October 2005, authorities held Abdel Kareem Nabeel Suleiman (Kareem Amer) for twelve days because of his writings about Islam and about sectarian riots in Alexandria. Al-Azhar University expelled Amer in March 2006 after its disciplinary board found him guilty of blasphemy against Islam. Well known for his secular views, Amer posted articles on his Internet blog about Islam and about the University. The Public Prosecutor in Alexandria summoned Amer on 7 November 2006. On 18 January 2007, Amer stood trial for "incitement to hate Muslims," "defaming the President of the Republic," and "insulting Islam." On 22 February 2007, a court sentenced Amer to four years in prison. Since that time, Amer has been in Borg Al-Arab prison and has been subject to mistreatment.

In 2005, authorities arrested Baha al-Aqqad, a recent convert to Christianity. The authorities jailed al-Aqqad, and repeatedly interrogated him about his "insults" to Islam. His lawyer was told that al-Aqqad was held on suspicion of "insulting a heavenly religion". Al-Aqqad's detention was renewed every forty-five days until—after two years—he was released without explanation.

=== 2001 ===
In 2001, an Emergency court sentenced Salaheddin Mohsen, a writer accused of blasphemy, to three years in prison with hard labor for writings deemed offensive to Islam. The court also ordered that all of Mohsen's books and publications be confiscated for containing "extremist" ideas. Mohsen's books promote secular thought.

In 2001, a female preacher Manal Manea was sentenced to three years in prison for atheism and blasphemy.

=== 2000 ===
On 8 and 9 May 2000, students at Al-Azhar University in Cairo rioted for two days over the publication in Egypt of Feast for Seaweed, a twenty-year-old novel by Hayder Hayder (also Haidar Haidar or Haydar Haydar), a Syrian. Officials at the University had told the students the novel was blasphemous. On 9 May 2000, the Committee of the Supreme Council for Culture, a state-appointed committee, concluded that the novel was not blasphemous. Officials at the University reconsidered the novel but insisted it was blasphemous. On 1 July 2000, Muhammad Hasanain Haykal, a prominent journalist and a former advisor to President Nasser, declared that the furor was a farce. The turmoil subsided.

=== 1993 ===
In 1993, al-Gama'a al-Islamiyya issued a fatwa against the playwright Karim Alrawi, citing as a reason his defence of Farag Fouda and stating that "the defence of an apostate is proof of apostasy". The fatwa was subsequently withdrawn after the intervention of the Egyptian Organization for Human Rights. Six months later, Alrawi was arrested and interrogated by Egyptian State Security. He was held without charges. On his release he was told that the state censor had deemed his play City of Peace, about the Sufi poet al Hallaj, blasphemous and that all his plays for the stage were denied a performance license.

=== 1992 ===
In 1992, Nasr Abu Zayd (also Nasr Abu Zeid) submitted academic publications to a committee at Cairo University because he wanted to be promoted to the position of full professor. One member of the committee criticized the orthodoxy of Abu Zayd's devotion to Islam. The member said Abu Zayd's writings contained clear affronts to the Islamic faith. On 18 March 1993, Cairo University denied Abu Zayd a full professorship. Rabble-rousers called Abu Zayd an apostate, and threatened him. A lawyer made application to have Abu Zayd divorced from his wife on the ground that a Muslim woman cannot be married to an apostate. The group Egyptian Islamic Jihad called for the killing of Abu Zayd. The police had to protect Abu Zayd if he wanted to go anywhere. On 23 July 1995, Abu Zayd and his wife left Egypt. They settled in the Netherlands.

In 1992, Alaa Hamed published The Bed (sometimes called The Mattress). The novel features a scene in which lovers fornicate on a prayer-rug. Al-Azhar complained of blasphemy. The public prosecutor prosecuted. An Emergency court sentenced Hamed to one year in prison. He lost his position as inspector in the Ministry of Tax Authorities. In 1997, Egypt prosecuted Hamed again for "Voyage into the Human Mind", a philosophical reflection on faith and atheism. He received a sentence of one year. On account of his poor health, Hamed petitioned the Cairo Appeal Court to suspend his sentence. The Court released him. On 5 June 2001, the public prosecutor put Hamed on trial because of his book Sadness of Frogs.

=== 1991 ===
In December 1991, an Emergency court convicted Alaa Hamed (or Hamid) for violating Egypt's anti-blasphemy law by publishing The Void in a Man’s Mind. In 1990, Al-Azhar University had complained that the novel had atheist and pagan ideas. The public prosecutor contended that Hamed's novel was "a serious threat to the fundamental beliefs of Egyptian society and, in particular, those connected with the person of God most Almighty and the heavenly religions, . . . representing . . . an incitement to atheism and apostasy." The court sentenced Hamed to eight years imprisonment. The court convicted Hamed's publisher, Mohamed Madbouli, and Hamed's printer, Fathi Fadel, of abetting Hamed's crime but the President or the Prime Minister set aside all the sentences. Hamed was in jail for several months as he awaited the trial. Madbouli was detained for four days before he appeared in court. Over his lifetime, Madbouli appeared in court on twenty-four matters related to his publishing of provocative books.

=== 1990 ===
In 1990, Al-Azhar University succeeded in having banned Farag Foda's book To Be or Not to Be. Foda was an outspoken critic of the repression by Islamic authorities in Egypt. Those authorities orchestrated a vicious campaign of lies to discredit and ruin Foda but Foda persisted in his criticism. On 3 June 1992, a group of "scholars" at Al-Azhar issued a communiqué which accused Foda of blasphemy. Five days later, two assassins from the group al-Gama'a al-Islamiyya shot Foda dead and wounded his son and several bystanders. Al-Azhar's Sheikh Muhammad al Ghazali had previously declared Foda an apostate, and said that Islamic law justified his killing. Al-Gama'a al-Islamiyya accepted responsibility for the murder. The group declared, "Al-Azhar issued the sentence and we carried out the execution".

=== 1959 ===
In 1959, officials at Al-Azhar University succeeded in having banned from Egypt Children of Gebelawi, a novel by Naguib Mahfouz, an Egyptian writer. The officials said the novel was blasphemous. In 1994, Islamic extremists attacked the 82-year-old, Nobel Prize-winning Mahfouz outside his Cairo home. The attackers stabbed Mahfouz in the neck. He survived but with permanent damage to the nerves in his right arm. Mahfouz's novel was not published again in Egypt until 2006, the year of Mahfouz's death.

== See also ==
- Apostasy in Islam
- Blasphemy
- Freedom of religion in Egypt
- Islam and blasphemy
- Religion in Egypt
