= Kareem Amer =

Egyptian blogger and former law student (born c. 1984)

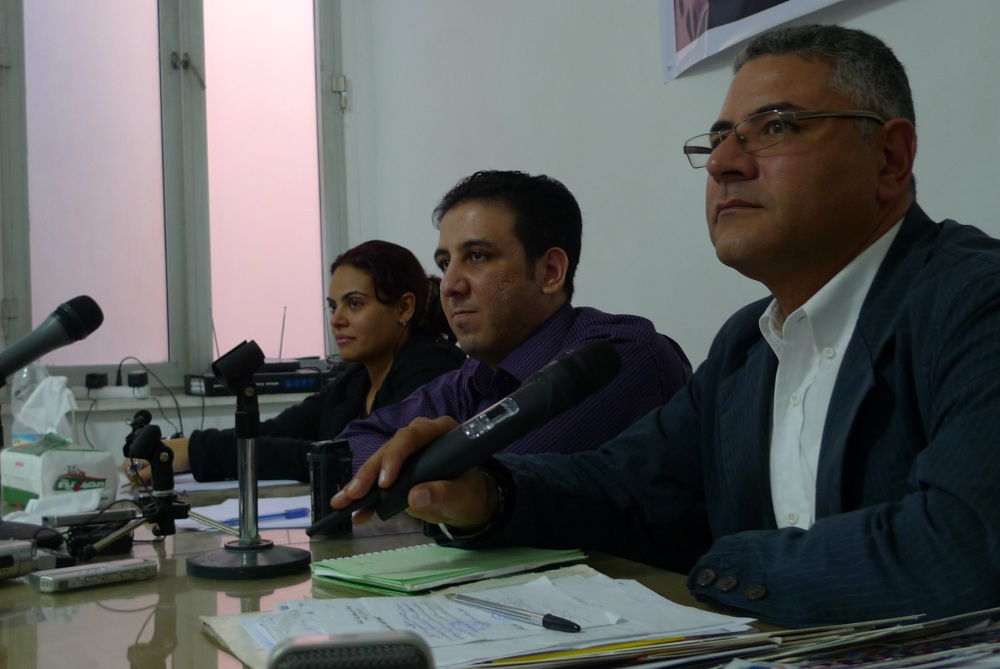
- Kareem Amer, center, delivers his first public remarks four days before the country's parliamentary elections. November 2010.
- Born: Kareem Nabil Suleiman Amer; 17 June 1984 (age 42); Alexandria, Egypt
- Occupation: blogger
- Known for: 2007–2010 imprisonment

Kareem Nabil Suleiman Amer (Arabic: كريم نبيل سليمان عامر, IPA: [ʕæbdelkeˈɾiːm næˈbiːl seleˈmæːn ˈʕæːmeɾ, -kæˈɾiːm-]) (born c. 1984) is an Egyptian Norwegian blogger and former law student. He was arrested by Egyptian authorities for posts on his blog that were considered to be anti-religious and insulting to Egyptian President Hosni Mubarak. On 22 February 2007, in his native city Alexandria, Amer was sentenced to three years of imprisonment for insulting Islam and inciting sedition and one year for insulting the Egyptian President Hosni Mubarak. He was the first blogger in Egypt explicitly arrested for the content of his writing, and was released on 17 November 2010, but not before he was beaten and detained by Egyptian security forces. He thereafter moved to Bergen, Norway where he obtained political asylum and gained Norwegian citizenship.

== Background ==
Kareem Amer, an ex-Muslim, secular Egyptian, completed elementary and secondary school at al-Azhar University. He wished to complete a biology degree, but family pressure forced him to enroll in al-Azhar's Department of Shari'a and Legal Studies instead.

In 2004, Amer began expressing his reformist views at "Modern Discussion", as well as "Copts United" by 2005. By mid-2006, he discontinued publishing at Copts United because he accuses them of limiting his writings to only criticizing Muslims and not Copts as well.

== First arrest ==
Amer first came to the attention of Egyptian authorities after he published a series of blog writings highly critical of the Muslim role in the deadly sectarian riots in Alexandria in 2005, the result of a play performed at a Coptic Orthodox Church of Alexandria, and the violent reaction of the Muslim community over the play's 'insult to Islam'.

On 26 October 2005, Amer was arrested for the first time by Egyptian state security agency Amn al-Dawla for anti-religious posts on his blog. He was detained for twelve days, and his books and personal writings were confiscated.

== Expulsion from al-Azhar ==
Early in 2006, Amer was expelled from al-Azhar University, Damanhour Campus, for criticizing some of the university's Islamist instructors, writing in his blog that the "professors and sheikhs at al-Azhar who ... stand against anyone who thinks freely" would "end up in the dustbin of history". He also posted writings that promoted secularism and women's rights.

Amer referred to the university as "the university of terrorism" and said that the institution stifles free thought.

University administrators also filed a communiqué to the Public Prosecutor Office against their former student, alleging he was "spreading rumours endangering public security" and "defaming President Mubarak".

== Second arrest ==
On 6 November 2006, Amer was again detained by the public prosecutor's office after it questioned him about his writings on "Modern Discussion" that were considered by authorities to be of an irreligious nature, and because of al-Azhar's complaint to the Public Prosecutor Office.

The Public Prosecutor told Amer that if he did not abandon his views, even though personal, he may be imprisoned. Nevertheless, Amer insisted on his right to freedom of expression. Consequently, Egyptian prosecutors ordered that Amer be held in a detention center in Alexandria until 22 November at least.

Amer was charged with:

- Atheism, due to some blog posts, such as "There is no God except the Human being" (in Arabic لا إله إلا الإنسان);
- Spreading information and malicious rumors that disrupt public security
- Defaming the president of Egypt
- Incitement to overthrow the regime based upon hatred and contempt
- Incitement to hate "Islam" and to breach public peace standards
- Highlighting inappropriate issues that harm the reputation of Egypt and spreading these publicly

== Trial ==
Amer defended himself by saying, "I don't see what I have done ... I expressed my opinion...the intention was not anything like these [charges]." Defence lawyers argued that crimes related to the Internet were new in Egypt and that the penal code did not cover them. Prosecution lawyer Mohamed Dawoud stated, "I want him [Nabil] to get the toughest punishment ... I am on a jihad here ... If we leave the likes of him without punishment, it will be like a fire that consumes everything." The blogger's father, Nabil Sulaiman, mocked the human rights organizations which tried to release his son. He called for applying Islamic Law "allowing him to repent within three days before killing him if he will not", according to the Egyptian newspaper Al-Masry Al-Youm.

On 22 February, the judge said Nabil was guilty and would serve three years for insulting Islam and inciting sedition, and one year for insulting Mubarak. An appeals court upheld the sentence on 13 March 2007.

== Reaction ==
=== United States ===
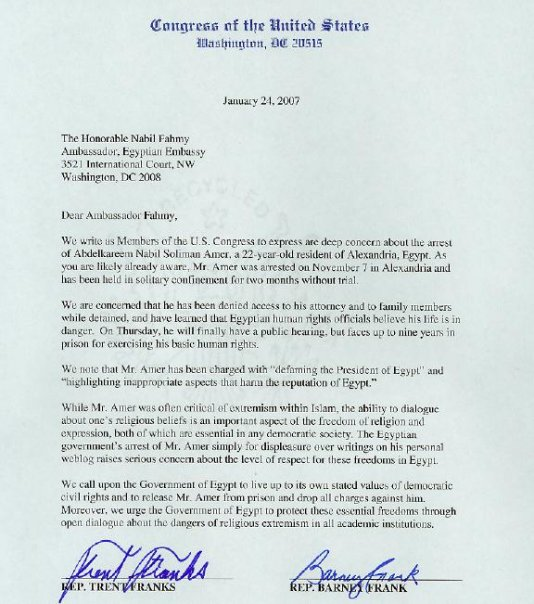
Two congressmen's co-signed letter to Egypt's Ambassador to the US.

United States Congressmen Trent Franks (R-AZ) and Barney Frank (D-MA) wrote to Egyptian Ambassador Nabil Fahmy regarding the arrest and imprisonment of Amer. Congressman Franks also said:

Democracies must allow for freedom of speech and certainly for the tolerance of diverse religious beliefs. I laud Mr. Amer's recognition that violence in the name of religion is unacceptable. I urge the Egyptian government to free Mr. Amer and to protect its citizens from persecution.

=== Italy ===
Three Italian MPs, former Minister of Defence Antonio Martino, President of the 10th Permanent Commission (Productive Affairs, Trade and Tourism) Daniele Capezzone, and Senator Gaetano Quagliariello wrote letters to the Egyptian Ambassador to Italy Mohamed Farid Monib.

=== NGOs ===
Amnesty International designated Amer a prisoner of conscience, "imprisoned simply for exercising his right to freedom of expression". After Amer's release, the organization called for Egypt to investigate his allegations that he was tortured while in custody. Human Rights Watch described Amer's arrest as a "chilling precedent" and called for his immediate release. The Arabic Network for Human Rights Information called Amer's sentencing a "gloomy day for freedom of expression in Egypt" and also urged his release.

PEN America made Amer one of its "highest priority cases", arguing that he was "jailed for exercising his inalienable human right to freedom of expression". Wikipedia co-founder Jimmy Wales discussed Amer's case during the WikiMania 2008 conference in Alexandria, suggesting that high-profile arrests like his could be hampering the development of the Arabic Wikipedia by making editors afraid to contribute.

=== UK ===
United Kingdom Independence Party (UKIP) Member of the European Parliament (MEP) Derek Clark made a speech at the EU parliament in Strasbourg on the matter of Kareen Amer and human rights in Egypt. The MEP for the East Midlands region called for the European Union to take advantage of a recently signed trade agreement with Egypt, which states that the EU will 'support Egyptian government efforts to protect human rights and fundamental freedoms in line with international conventions to which Egypt is party'.

== Release ==
Amer was briefly freed on 5 November 2010, having served the full four years of his sentence. He was quickly rearrested by the Interior Ministry and detained for eleven additional days, during which time he later stated that he was tortured. Following his second release on November 16, he stated that he had no regrets for his previous words, and intended to continue blogging.

== Role in 2011 Egyptian revolution ==
During the 2011 Egyptian revolution of the Arab Spring, Amer participated in the protests at Tahrir Square. He was arrested by the Egyptian Army on February 6 while leaving a protest. After three days in custody, he was released without charge. Since 2012, he's lived in exile in Norway in order to avoid further legal issues with the Egyptian authorities. Norwegian media have hosted articles and interviews of him. Through them, he urges the Norwegian society and the rest of Europe to show a more critical attitude towards Islam. He became a Norwegian citizen in 2020.
