= List of former Muslims =

Former Muslims or ex-Muslims are people who were Muslims, but subsequently left Islam.

Although their numbers have increased in the US, ex-Muslims still face ostracism or retaliation from their families and communities due to beliefs about apostasy in Islam.

In 23 countries apostasy is a punishable crime and in 13 of those it carries the death penalty.

== Part of an unorganized religion or no religion ==
=== Became non-religious ===
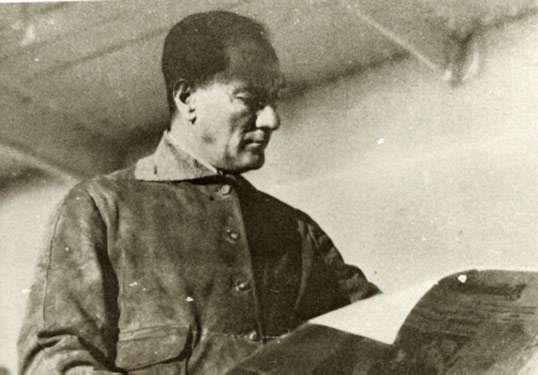
Mustafa Kemal Atatürk, founder of the Republic of Turkey

- Mustafa Kemal Atatürk – Turkish field marshal, statesman, secularist reformer, and author. Sources point out that Atatürk was a religious skeptic and a freethinker. While his specific religious views are unclear, he was a non-doctrinaire deist. According to Atatürk, the Turkish people do not know what Islam really is and do not read the Quran. People are influenced by Arabic sentences that they do not understand, and because of their customs they go to mosques. When the Turks read the Quran and think about it, they will leave Islam. Atatürk described Islam as the religion of the Arabs in his own work titled Vatandaş için Medeni Bilgiler by his own critical and nationalist views.
- Nyamko Sabuni – politician in Sweden
- Sajid Javid – British politician
- Mansiya V.P. – Bharatnatyam exponent from Kerala, India. Non-conformist on religious front but believes in God.
- Nas Daily – Israeli-Palestinian vlogger, he identifies as a non-religious Muslim.

=== Became deists ===
- Ahmad Kasravi – notable Iranian linguist, historian, and reformer.
- Ehsan Jami – former politician and founder of Central Committee for Ex-Muslims.

=== Became agnostics ===
- Alyque Padamsee – Indian theatre personality and ad filmmaker. He was the father of Indian advertising. He was agnostic.
- Fareed Zakaria – Indian-American CNN host. He is a self described secular and non practicing Muslim. He added: "My views on faith are complicated—somewhere between deism and agnosticism. I am completely secular in my outlook."
- Ibn al-Rawandi – early skeptic of Islam.
- Ibn Warraq – British Pakistani secularist author and founder of the Institute for the Secularisation of Islamic Society.
- Kia Abdullah – British novelist and travel writer. In 2020, she stated that she identifies as an agnostic and a secular Muslim.
- Orhan Pamuk – Turkish novelist and screenwriter. Describes himself as a cultural Muslim while not believing in a personal connection to God.
- Sohail Ahmed – Former radical Islamist. He now describes himself as a cultural Muslim who rejects the truth claims of Islam.
- Wafa Sultan – Syrian-born American psychiatrist and controversial critic of Islam. She describes herself as a "Secular Humanist"
- Younus Shaikh – Pakistani medical doctor, human rights activist, rationalist and free-thinker.

=== Became atheists ===
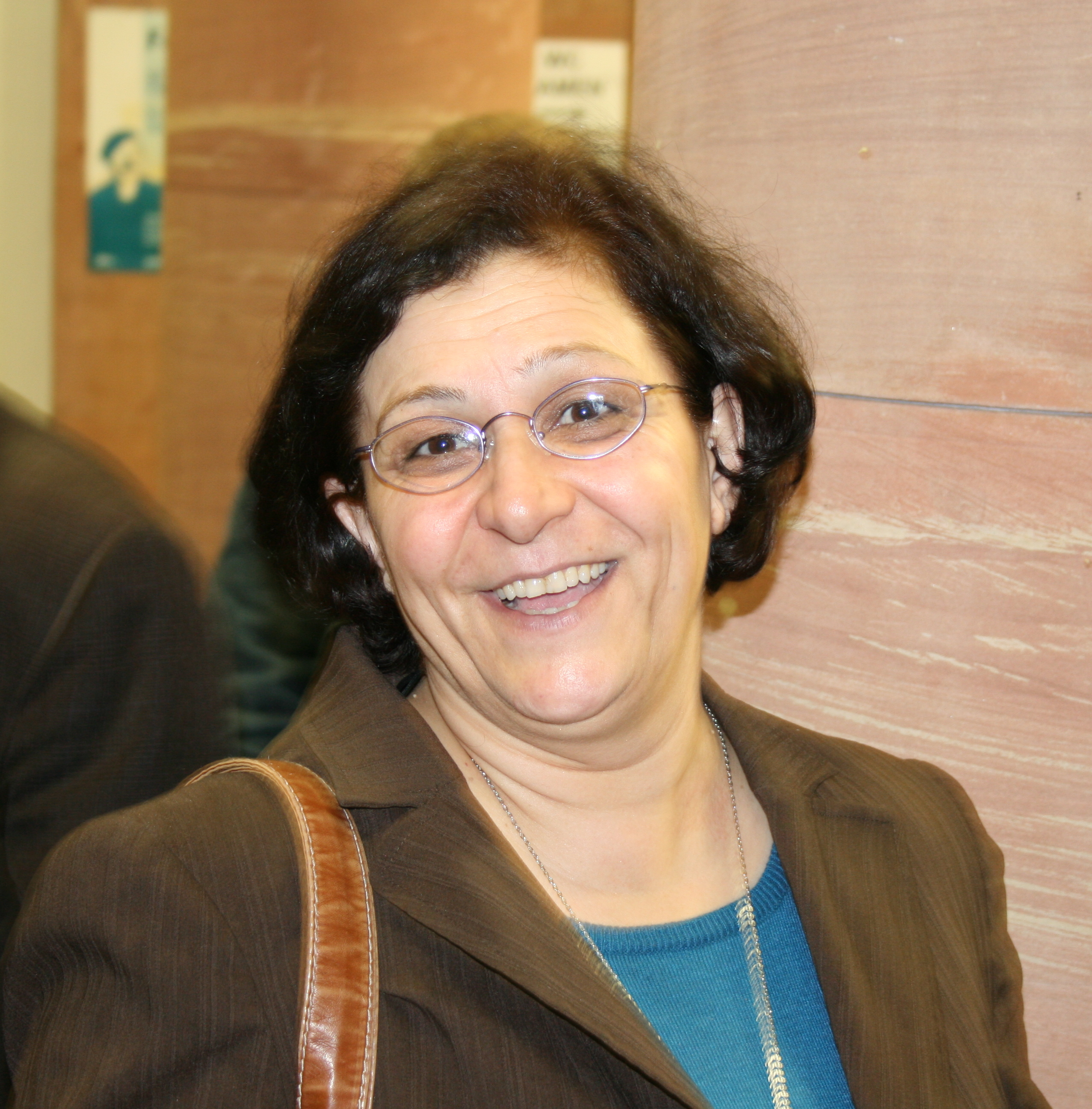
Mina Ahadi, founder of the Central Council of Ex-Muslims

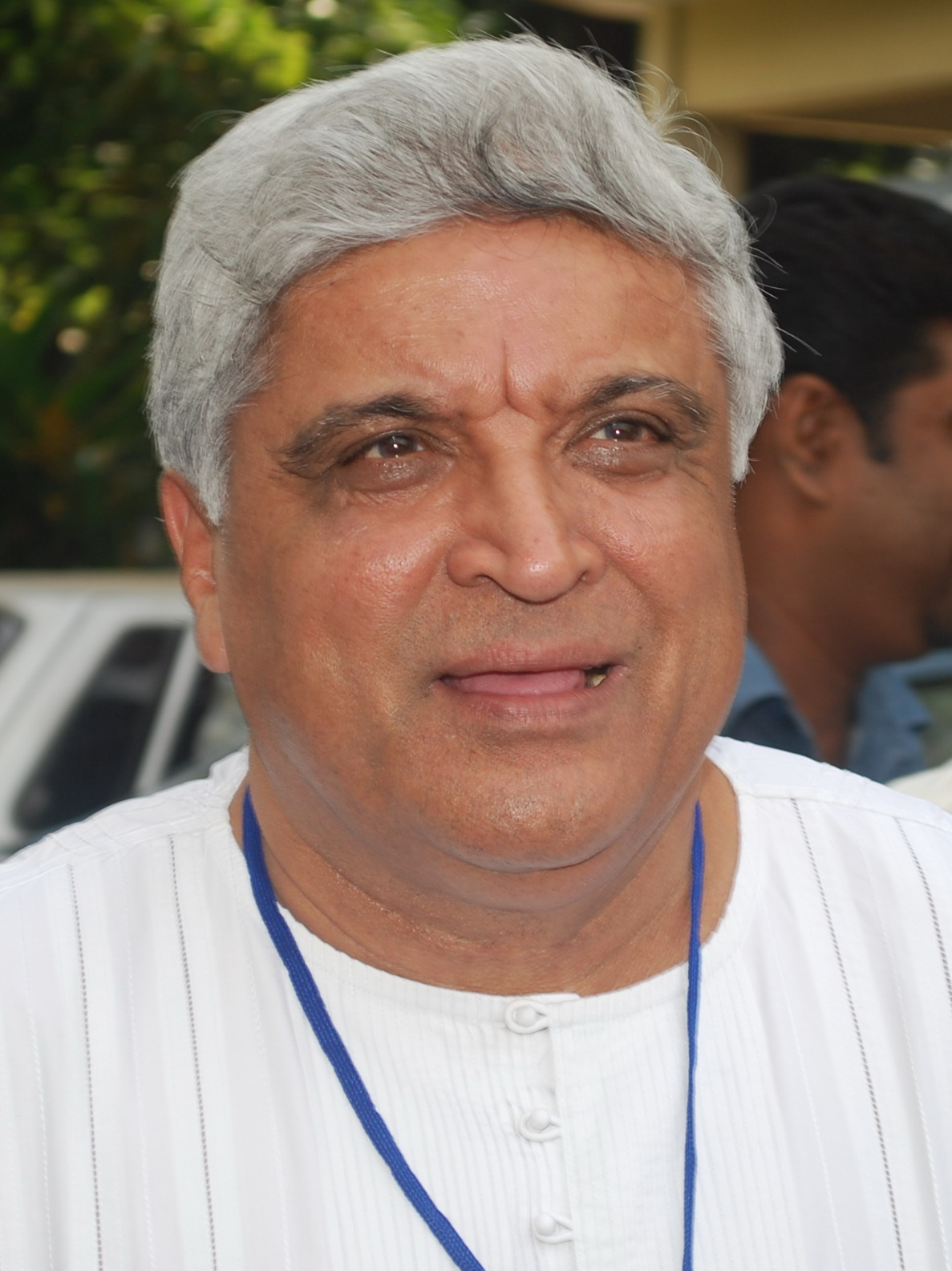
Javed Akhtar, noted Indian writer and lyricist

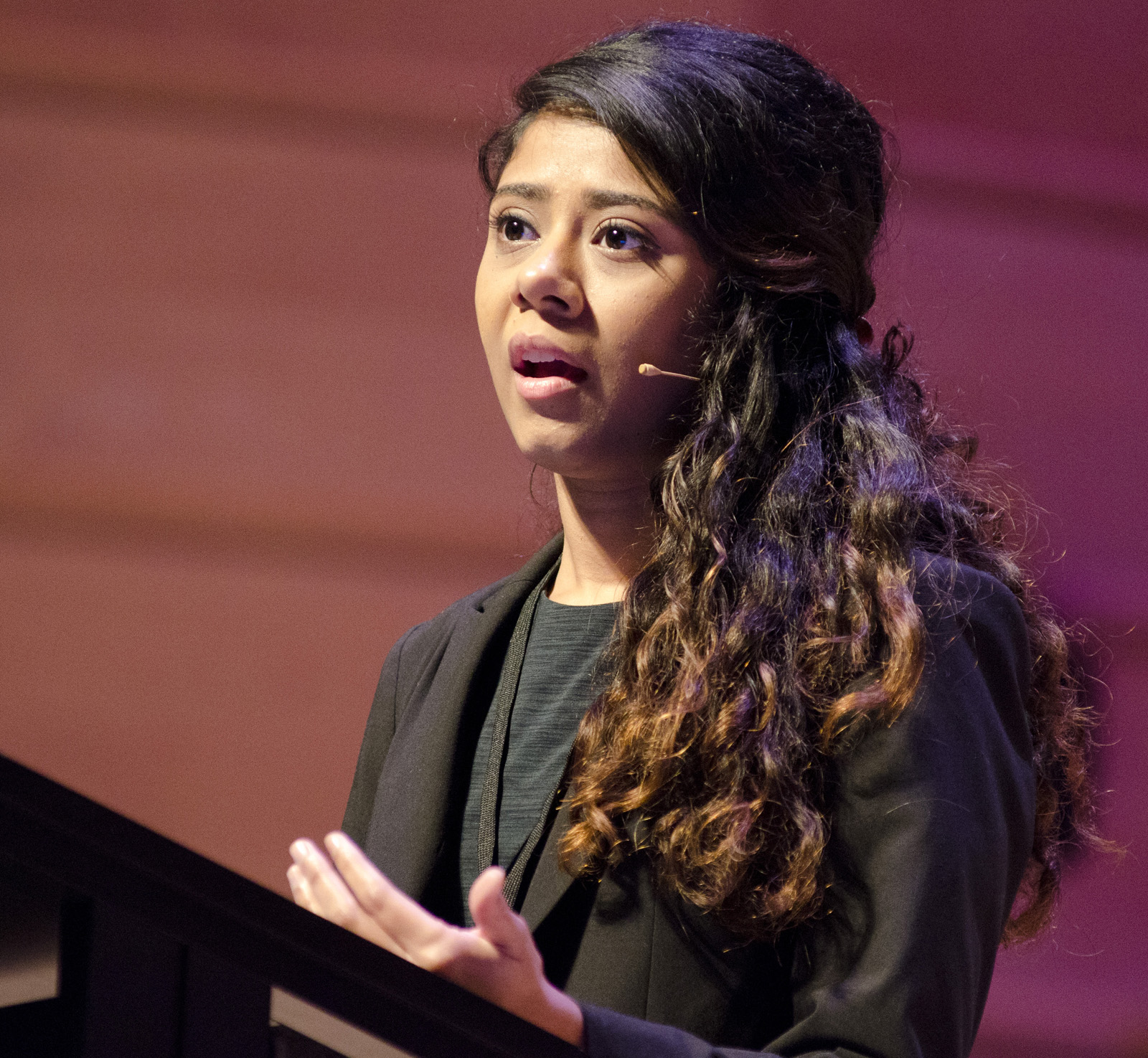
Sarah Haider, cofounder of Ex-Muslims of North America

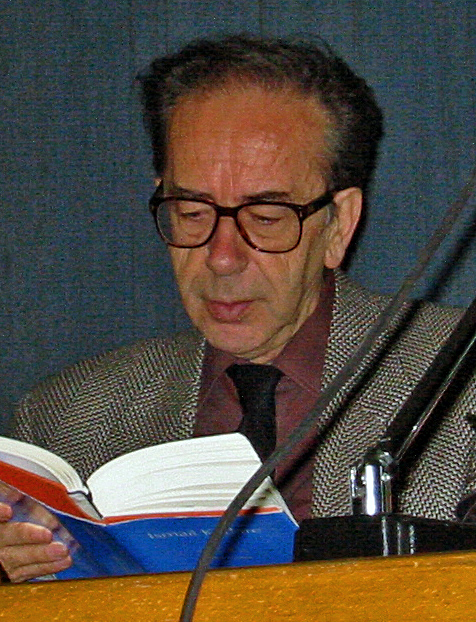
Ismail Kadare, noted Albanian writer

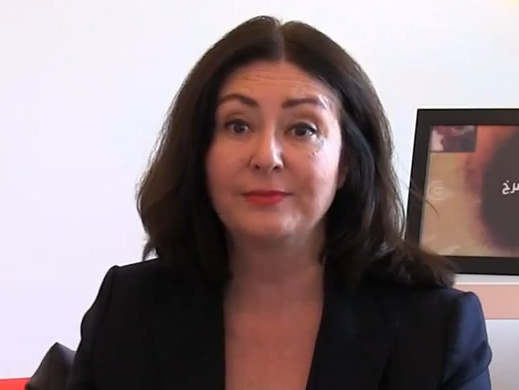
Maryam Namazie, cofounder of the Council of Ex-Muslims of Britain

Armin Navabi, founder of Atheist Republic, about leaving Islam

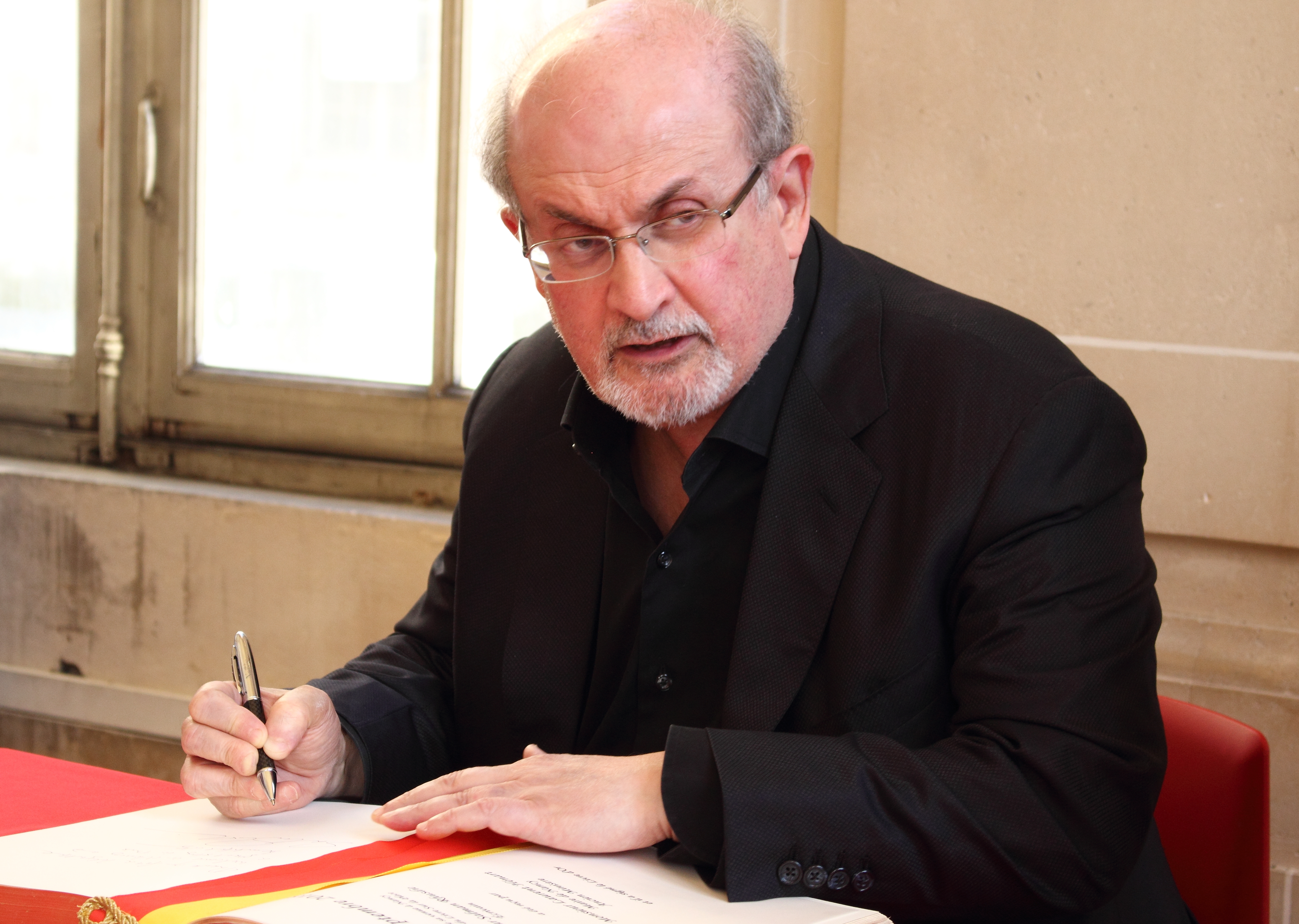
Salman Rushdie, author of The Satanic Verses

- Abdullah al-Qasemi – one of the most controversial intellectuals in the Arab world because of his radical change from defending Salafism to defending atheism and rejecting organized religion.
- Afshin Ellian – Iranian-Dutch professor of law, philosopher, and poet.
- Ahmed Harqan – Egyptian human rights activist and outspoken atheist.
- Ahmed Sharif – Bangladeshi humanist book seller, human rights activist and secular humanist.
- Al-Ma'arri – blind Arab philosopher, poet and writer.
- Alexander Aan – Indonesian atheist and ex-Muslim of Minang descent, who was attacked by a mob and arrested in 2012 for posting "God does not exist" and other antireligious writings on Facebook, attracting international attention.
- Ali A. Rizvi – Pakistani-born Canadian physician, writer and ex-Muslim activist
- Ali Soilih – Comorian socialist revolutionary; president of the Comoros.
- Ali Dashti – Iranian rationalist and member of Iranian Senate.
- Ali Sina – pseudonym of the founder of several anti-Islam and anti-Muslim websites.
- Aliaa Magda Elmahdy – Egyptian internet activist and women's rights advocate.
- Aliyah Saleem – British secular education campaigner, writer and market researcher, activist and co-founder of advocacy group Faith to Faithless.
- Anwar Shaikh – British author of Pakistani descent.
- Armin Navabi – Iranian-born atheist and secular activist, author, podcaster and vlogger, founder of Atheist Republic
- Aroj Ali Matubbar – self-taught Bangladeshi philosopher
- Arzu Toker – German-speaking writer, journalist, publicist, translator of Turkish descent, cofounder of the Central Council of Ex-Muslims in Germany.
- As'ad Abu Khalil – Lebanese professor of political science at California State University, Stanislaus. He describes himself as an "atheist secularist".
- Asif Mohiuddin – Bangladeshi blogger and secularist
- Ma'ruf al-Rusafi – Considered a national poet of Iraq, he was a Sunni Muslim imam, and later became an atheist.
- Ayaz Nizami – Pakistani Islamic scholar became atheist, founder of realisticapproach.org. an Urdu website about atheism, and Vice President of Atheist & Agnostic Alliance Pakistan He is currently detained under the charges of blasphemy and could face the death penalty.
- Aziz Nesin – popular Turkish humorist and author of more than 100 books.
- Barack Obama Sr. – Kenyan senior governmental economist, and the father of 44th U.S. President Barack Obama.
- Bisi Alimi – Nigerian gay rights activist based in the United Kingdom
- Catherine Perez-Shakdam – French journalist, political analyst and commentator; formerly a convert to Islam, born to a Jewish family
- Bonya Ahmed – Bangladeshi-American author, humanist activist and blogger, wife of Avijit Roy; hacked to death after receiving threats related to his promotion of secular views.
- Cenk Uygur – American political commentator of Turkish descent and the main host of the liberal talk radio show The Young Turks.
- Ebru Umar – Dutch columnist of Turkish descent, critic of Islam and of Turkish president Recep Tayyip Erdoğan.
- Enver Hoxha – Communist dictator who declared Albania the first atheist state, and who has been identified as an "arch-atheist".
- Fatima Sana Shaikh – Indian actress
- Faik Konitza – Albanian stylist, critic, publicist and political figure that had a tremendous impact on Albanian writing and on Albanian culture at the time.
- Faisal Saeed Al Mutar – Iraqi-born satirist, human rights activist, writer, founder of the Global Secular Humanist Movement (GSHM).
- Farhan Akhtar – Indian actor, singer, songwriter, playback singer, producer and television host.
- Fauzia Ilyas – founder of Atheist & Agnostic Alliance Pakistan
- Hafid Bouazza – Moroccan-Dutch writer.
- Hamed Abdel-Samad – German-Egyptian political scientist, historian and author.
- Husayn Muruwwa – Lebanese communist philosopher and ex-ayatollah who was nicknamed "red mujtahid".
- Hassan Bahara – Moroccan-Dutch writer.
- Humayun Azad – Bangladeshi author, poet, scholar and linguists.
- Inkulab – Tamil rationalist poet/writer and Marxist activist. Born as Sakul Hameed.
- Irfan Habib – Indian historian.
- Ismael Adham – Egyptian writer and philosopher.
- Ismail Kadare – world-renowned Albanian writer.
- Ismail Mohamed (activist) – Egyptian atheist human rights activist, host of The Black Ducks programme.
- Javed Akhtar – noted Indian writer and lyricist.
- Kacem El Ghazzali – Moroccan-Swiss writer and activist.
- Kanan Makiya – Iraqi-American academic and Islamic and Middle Eastern scholar.
- Kareem Amer – Egyptian blogger.
- Kumail Nanjiani – Pakistani American stand-up comic and actor.
- Lounès Matoub – Algerian Berber Kabyle singer.
- Maryam Namazie – Iranian communist, political activist and leader of the British apostate-organization Council of Ex-Muslims of Britain.
- Massin Kevin Labidi – Dutch atheist activist of Tunisian descent, known for criticism of Islam.
- Mina Ahadi – Iranian-born pacifist, founder of the German apostate-organization "Zentralrat der Ex-Muslime".
- Mirza Fatali Akhundov – 19th century Azerbaijani playwright and philosopher.
- Muhammad Syed – Pakistani American speaker and political activist. Co-founder of Ex-Muslims of North America.
- Nahla Mahmoud – Sudanese-born British writer, secularist, environmentalist, and human rights activist, and spokesperson for the Council of Ex-Muslims of Britain.
- Parvin Darabi – Iranian born American activist, writer and woman's rights activist.
- Pelin Batu – Turkish actress and television personality
- Rahaf Mohammed – Saudi Arabian refugee in Canada whose January 2019 flight attracted international attention and involved diplomatic intervention.
- Ramiz Alia – Albanian communist leader and former president of Albania.
- Rana Ahmad – Saudi Arabian refugee in Germany, author, women's rights activist and founder of the Atheist Refugee Relief.
- Razib Khan – Bangladeshi-American writer in population genetics and consumer genomics.
- Sagopa Kajmer – Turkish rap musician, songwriter, record producer and DJ
- Salman Rushdie – British-Indian novelist and essayist.
- Sam Touzani – Belgian actor, TV presenter, choreographer and comedian with Moroccan roots, critic of both the far-right and Islamism.
- Sarah Haider – American writer, speaker, political activist and co-founder of Ex-Muslims of North America.
- Sarmad Kashani – seventeenth-century mystical poet and sufi saint, arrived from Persia to India, beheaded for assumed heresy by the Mughal emperor, Aurungzebe. Sarmad renounced Judaism, briefly converting to Islam and then Hinduism. He later denounced all religions and rejected belief in gods.
- Sofia Ashraf, Indian rapper and actress.
- Sibel Kekilli – German actress of Turkish origin, known for her role as 'Shae' in Game of Thrones. Kekili was raised as a Muslim, but does not belong to any religion anymore, and although she stated she respects all religions, has criticised the physical mistreatment of women in Islam.
- Sherif Gaber – Egyptian political activist and blogger.
- Taslima Nasrin – Bangladeshi author, feminist, human rights activist and secular humanist.
- Turan Dursun – Turkish author and Islamic scholar. He was once a Turkish mufti and later authored many books critical of Islam.
- Urfi Javed, Indian actress and model.
- Valon Behrami – Kosovo-born Swiss professional footballer who plays as a midfielder for English club Watford.
- Waleed Al-Husseini – Palestinian philosopher, essayist, writer, blogger and co-founder of Council of Ex-Muslims in France (CEMF).
- Yasmine Mohammed – Canadian-born human rights activist, founder of Free Hearts, Free Minds and author of Unveiled: How Western Liberals Empower Radical Islam.
- Zackie Achmat – South African anti-HIV/AIDS activist; founder of the Treatment Action Campaign.
- Zara Kay – Tanzanian-Australian activist, founder of Faithless Hijabi.
- Zineb El Rhazoui – Moroccan-born French journalist and former columnist for Paris-based satirical magazine Charlie Hebdo.
- Zoya Akhtar – Indian director and screenwriter.

=== Undetermined current belief system ===
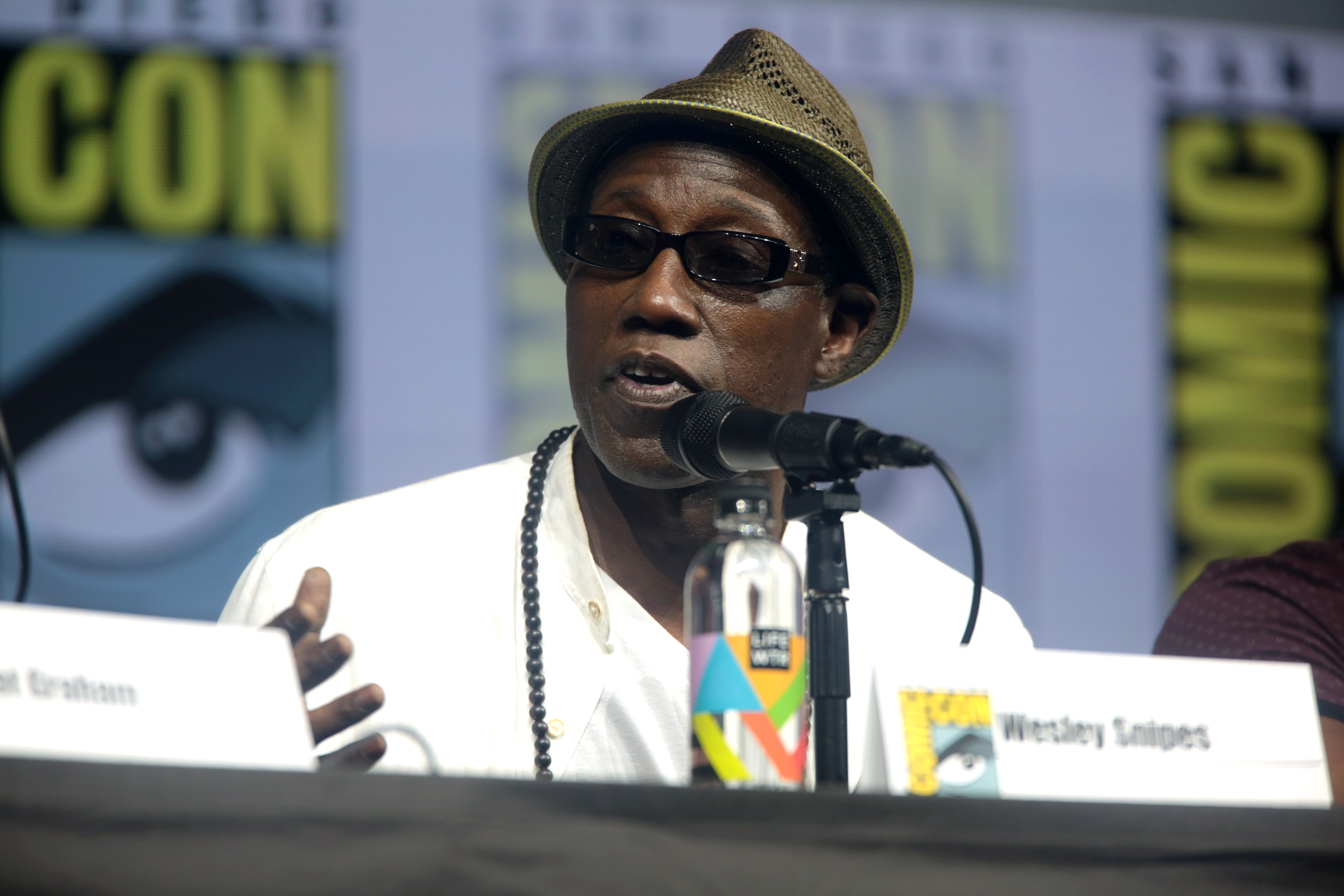
U.S. actor Wesley Snipes converted from Christianity to Islam in 1978, but left in 1988.

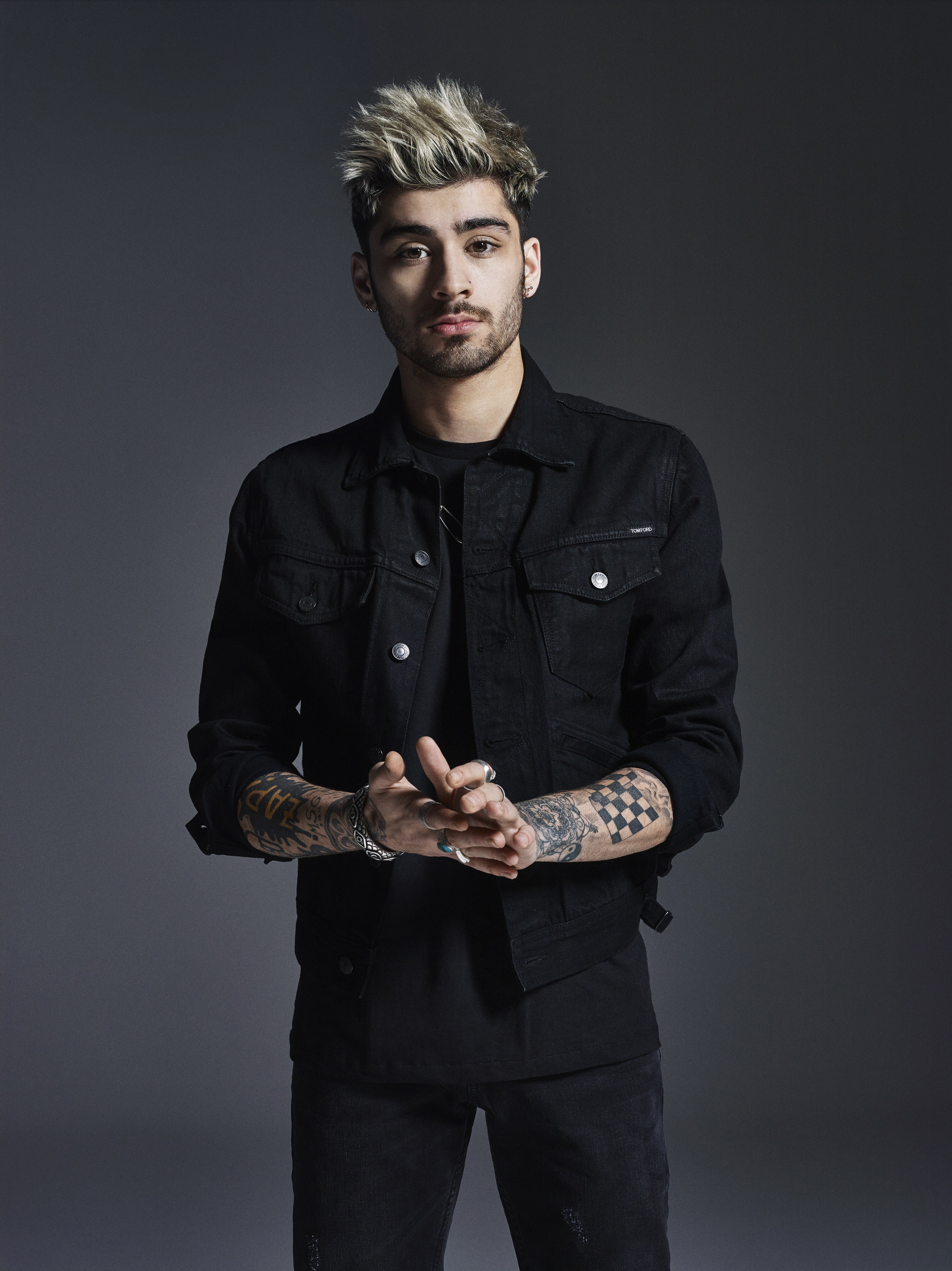
Zayn Malik, English singer-songwriter

- Charles Bronson – British criminal and self-styled "most violent prisoner in Britain".
- David Hicks – Australian-born Guantanamo Bay detainee who converted to Islam and was notorious in his homeland for his once support of radical Islam and for the circumstances surrounding his incarceration, is believed to have renounced Islam whilst incarcerated at Guantanamo Bay.
- Khalid Duran – specialist in the history, sociology and politics of the Islamic world.
- Lex Hixon – not raised religious; Conversions to Hinduism, Sufism. Eastern Orthodox Christianity, and possibly Zen.
- Linda Thompson – British folk singer who, along with her husband Richard, converted to Sufism in the 1970s. The couple have since divorced and she has left the religion.
- Trie Utami – Indonesian singer who after a stormy divorce is known to have left Islam after 2005, but she refuses to declare to what religion she converted.
- Wesley Snipes – American actor, film producer, and martial artist.
- Zayn Malik – English singer of Pakistani and English-Irish descent and boy band One Direction.

== Converted to an Indian religion ==
- Piro Preman, first female Punjabi-language poet who lived in the 19th century. Born a Muslim but became an apostate after joining the Gulabdasia sect

=== Converted to Sikhism ===
- Kuldip Manak – Punjabi folk singer
- Bhai Mardana – companion of Guru Nanak

=== Converted to Buddhism ===
- Anggun, Indonesian-French singer, songwriter, and television personality.
- Princess Mother Sri Sulalai (1770–1837), the consort of Phra Phutthaloetla Naphalai, Rama II of Siam and was the mother of Nangklao, Rama III.
- The Bunnag family, powerful noble family of Mon-Persian descent of the early Rattanakosin Kingdom of Siam, the descendants of Sheikh Ahmad who converted to Buddhism.
- Jongkol Kittikachorn, wife of Field Marshal Thanom Kittikachorn, the 10th Prime Minister of Thailand. She converted to Buddhism in 1930.
- Karim Samlee, Bangladeshi-Thai magician and actor.
- Kylie Padilla, Filipino actress, singer, model and martial artist. Born as a Jehovah's Witness, she converted to Islam from childhood few years after her father Robin's conversion, despite not being devout growing up. She now identifies as a Buddhist as of 2025.
- Lee Yaping, Taiwanese singer. She became famous overnight with the song "Wake Up! Lei Mengna" and is very popular in Hong Kong and Southeast Asia.
- Ipshita Shabnam, Bangladeshi model and actress. She converted to Buddhism while marrying Partha Barua in 2007.
- Napapa Tantrakul (1986–), Thai actress who was raised as Muslim and converted to Buddhism in 2016
- Nora Ariffin, Singaporean actress, fashion model and real estate broker.
- Nusaba Punnakan, Thai actress and presenter. She has been acting since 1992 and is the spouse of politician Puttipong Punnakan.
- Patumwadi Sosaphan, Thai singer and actress. Born in a Muslim family and converted to Buddhism during marriage in 1966.
- Tillakaratne Dilshan (1976–), Sri Lankan cricket player who converted from Islam to Buddhism at the age of 16, previously known as Tuwan Muhammad Dilshan
- Tillakaratne Sampath (1982–), Sri Lankan cricket player who was previously known as Tuwan Mohammad Nishan Sampath
- Suraj Randiv (1985–), Sri Lankan cricket player who was previously known as Mohamed Marshuk Mohamed Suraj
- Pai Hsien-yung (1937–), son of KMT Muslim General Bai Chongxi, a Chinese American writer of Hui descent
- Winai Kraibutr, Thai actor and television personality.
- Wong Ah Kiu (1918–2006), Malay woman born to a Muslim family but raised as Buddhist; her conversion from Islam became a legal issue in Malaysia on her death

=== Converted to Hinduism ===
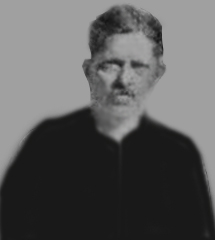
Harilal Gandhi converted to Islam, adopted the name "Abdullah Gandhi", but later converted to Hinduism.

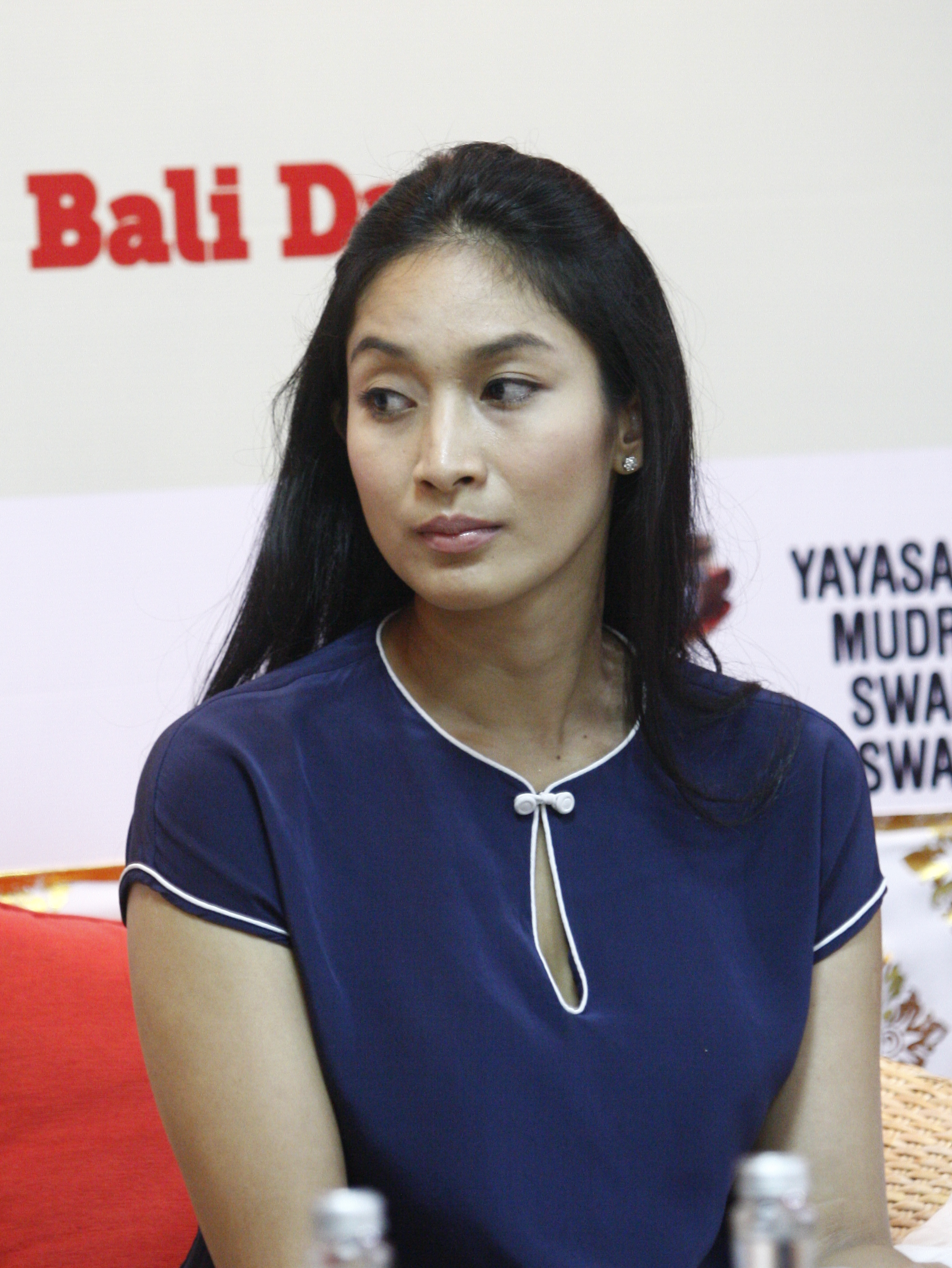
Happy Salma, Indonesian actress, writer, model, converted to Hinduism, became princess and member of the Lordship of Ubud after marriage.

- Annapurna Devi (born Roshanara Khan) – surbahar (bass sitar) player and music teacher in the North Indian classical tradition. She converted to Hinduism upon marriage.
- Anwar Shaikh – British author
- Aashish Khan (born Ustad Aashish Khan Debsharma) – Indian musician
- Asha Gawli – (born Ayesha) wife of Arun Gawli, notorious gangster turned politician from Mumbai, India. She converted to Hinduism upon marriage.
- Bukka I – King of Vijayanagara Empire who converted to Islam, then reverted to Hinduism. The early life of Bukka as well as his brother Hakka (also known as Harihara I) are relatively unknown and most accounts of their early life are based on theories.
- Chander Mohan – former Deputy Chief Minister of Haryana State in India. He was born Chandra Mohan he converted to Islam after marriage and again reverted to Hinduism after his divorce.
- Happy Salma – Indonesian actress, writer, model, became princess and member of the Lordship of Ubud after marriage.
- Haridas Thakura – prominent Vaishnavite saint, instrumental in the early appearance and spread of Hare Krishna movement.
- Harihara I – King of Vijayanagara Empire who converted to Islam, then reconverted.
- Harilal Mohandas Gandhi – son of Mahatma Gandhi. Upon converting to Islam he adopted the name Abdullah Gandhi, but later again reverted to Hinduism.
- Ifa Sudewi – Indonesian chief judge for the 2002 Bali bombing trials.
- Khushboo Sundar – Tamil movie actress. She converted to Hinduism upon marriage.
- Nargis – Bollywood film actress. Mother of Indian actor Sanjay Dutt.
- Netaji Palkar – Maratha noble and commander-in-chief of the army of Chhatrapati Shivaji, 19 June 1676.
- Sukmawati Sukarnoputri – daughter of Indonesia's founding president Sukarno and his wife Fatmawati. Sister of former Indonesian president Megawati Sukarnoputri, Sukmawati converted to Hinduism during a Sudhi Wadani ceremony in October 2021.
- Zubeida – Bollywood film actress, on whose life story the film Zubeidaa was based. She converted to Hinduism upon marriage.
- Wasim Rizvi – Indian Shia and WAQF board chairman, converted to Hinduism.
- Ali Akbar – Kerala film maker, converted to Hinduism.

== Converted to an Abrahamic religion ==
=== Converted to Judaism ===
- Amina Dawood Al-Mufti – Jordanian Muslim of Circassian origin, converted to Judaism upon marrying an Israeli Jewish pilot in secret in Vienna. She later became a spy for Mossad. An Arabic TV series called An Eastern Girl (فتاة من الشرق) (Fatah min Asharq) was made about her starring Suzan Najm Aldeen as Amina. The book (مذكرات أخطر جاسوسة عربية للموساد .. أمينة المفتي) was written about her.
- Avraham Sinai – Lebanese former Shi'ite who converted to Judaism. He served as an informant for the Israelis while serving in Hezbollah, until his actions were uncovered. He fled to Israel and subsequently converted.
- Dario Hunter – American politician. Became the first Muslim born individual to be ordained a rabbi.
- Yasmeen Ali – British adult actress of Afghan origin. Converted to Judaism while dating her Jewish boyfriend.

=== Converted to the Bábí and Baháʼí Faith ===
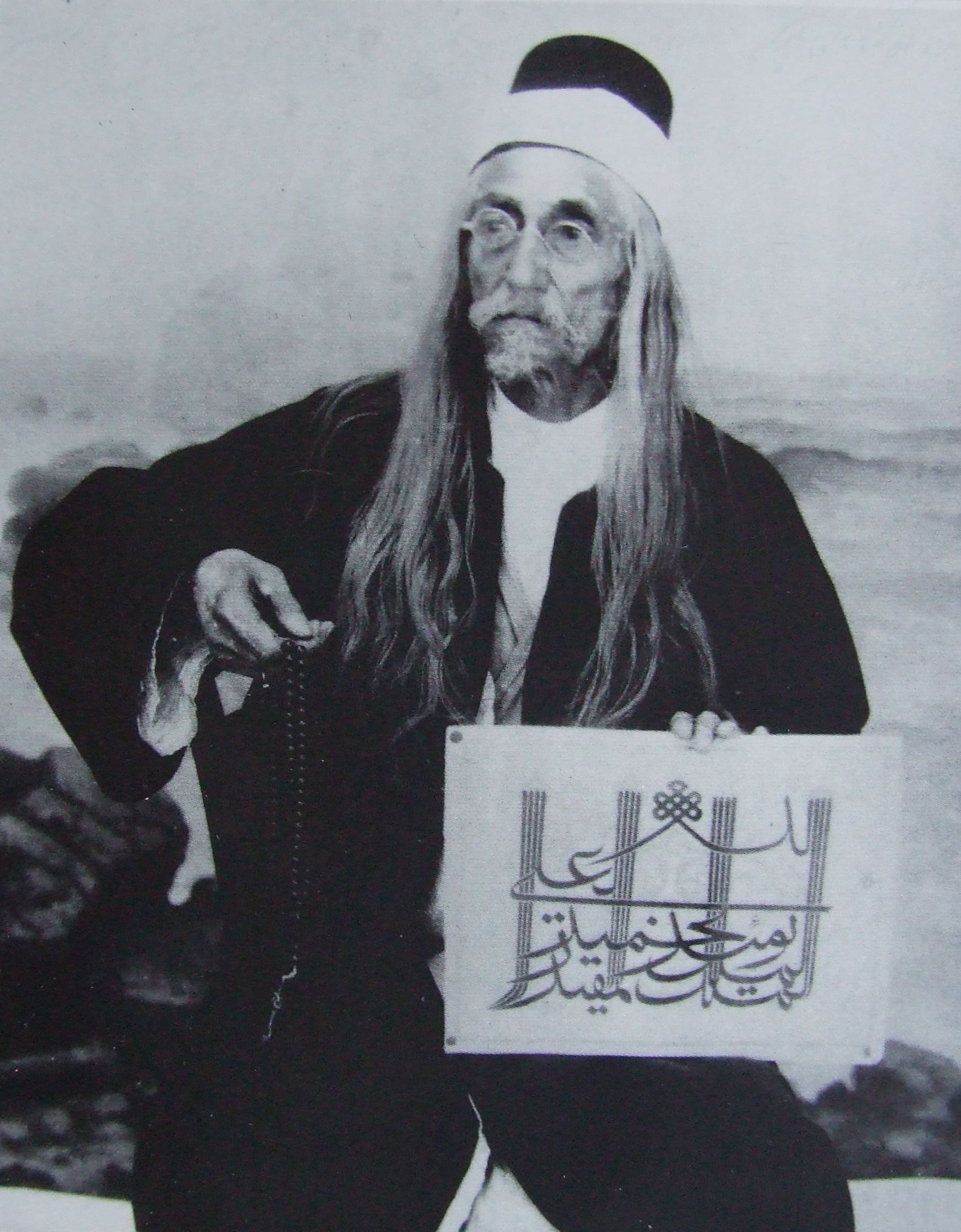
Mishkín-Qalam was a prominent Bahá'í and one of the nineteen Apostles of Bahá'u'lláh, as well as a famous calligrapher of 19th century Persia.

These were mostly people who were followers of the Bahá'u'lláh at the time he founded the Baháʼí Faith. They were formerly Muslims.

- Hají Ákhúnd – eminent follower of Bahá'u'lláh. He was appointed a Hand of the Cause, and identified as one of the nineteen Apostles of Bahá'u'lláh.
- Ibn-i-Abhar – appointed a Hand of the Cause, and identified as one of the nineteen Apostles of Bahá'u'lláh.
- Mírzá Abu'l-Fadl – foremost Baháʼí scholar who helped spread the Baháʼí Faith in Egypt, Turkmenistan, and the United States. One of the few Apostles of Bahá'u'lláh who never actually met Bahá'u'lláh.
- Mírzá Mahmúd – eminent follower of Bahá'u'lláh, the founder of the Baháʼí Faith.
- Mishkín-Qalam – prominent Baháʼí and one of the nineteen Apostles of Bahá'u'lláh, as well as a famous calligrapher of 19th century Persia.
- Nabíl-i-A'zam – Baháʼí historian and one of the nineteen Apostles of Bahá'u'lláh
- Núrayn-i-Nayyirayn – two brothers who were beheaded in the city of Isfahan in 1879.
- Somaya Ramadan – 2001 winner of the Naguib Mahfouz Medal for Literature.
- Táhirih – Persian poet and theologian of the Bábí faith in Iran.

=== Converted to Christianity ===
- Abdul Rahman – Afghan convert to Christianity who escaped the death penalty because of foreign pressure.
- Aben Humeya – (born Fernando de Valor) Morisco Chief who was crowned the Emir of Andalusia by his followers and led the Morisco Revolt against Philip II of Spain.
- Abo of Tiflis – Christian activist and the Patron Saint of the city of Tbilisi, Georgia.
- Abraham of Bulgaria – martyr and saint of the Russian Orthodox Church.
- St. Adolphus – Christian martyr who was put to death along with his brother, John, by Abd ar-Rahman II, Emir of Córdoba for apostasy.
- Ahmed Hassanein – first player of Egyptian heritage ever drafted into the NFL.
- Akbar Gbaja-Biamila – American football player.

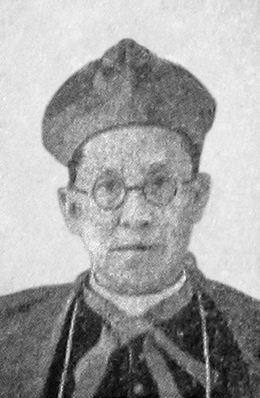
Albertus Soegijapranata, a National Hero of Indonesia, was the first native Indonesian Roman Catholic bishop in Indonesia.

- Albertus Soegijapranata – born in Surakarta, to a Muslim courtier and his wife who later converted to Roman Catholicism; the first native Indonesian bishop; a National Hero of Indonesia; known for his pro-nationalistic stance, often expressed as "100% Catholic, 100% Indonesian".
- Alexander Bekovich-Cherkassky – Russian officer of Circassian origin who led the first Russian military expedition into Central Asia.
- Alexander Kazembek – Russian Orientalist, historian and philologist of Azeri origin .
- Aman Tuleyev – Russian governor of Kemerovo Oblast.

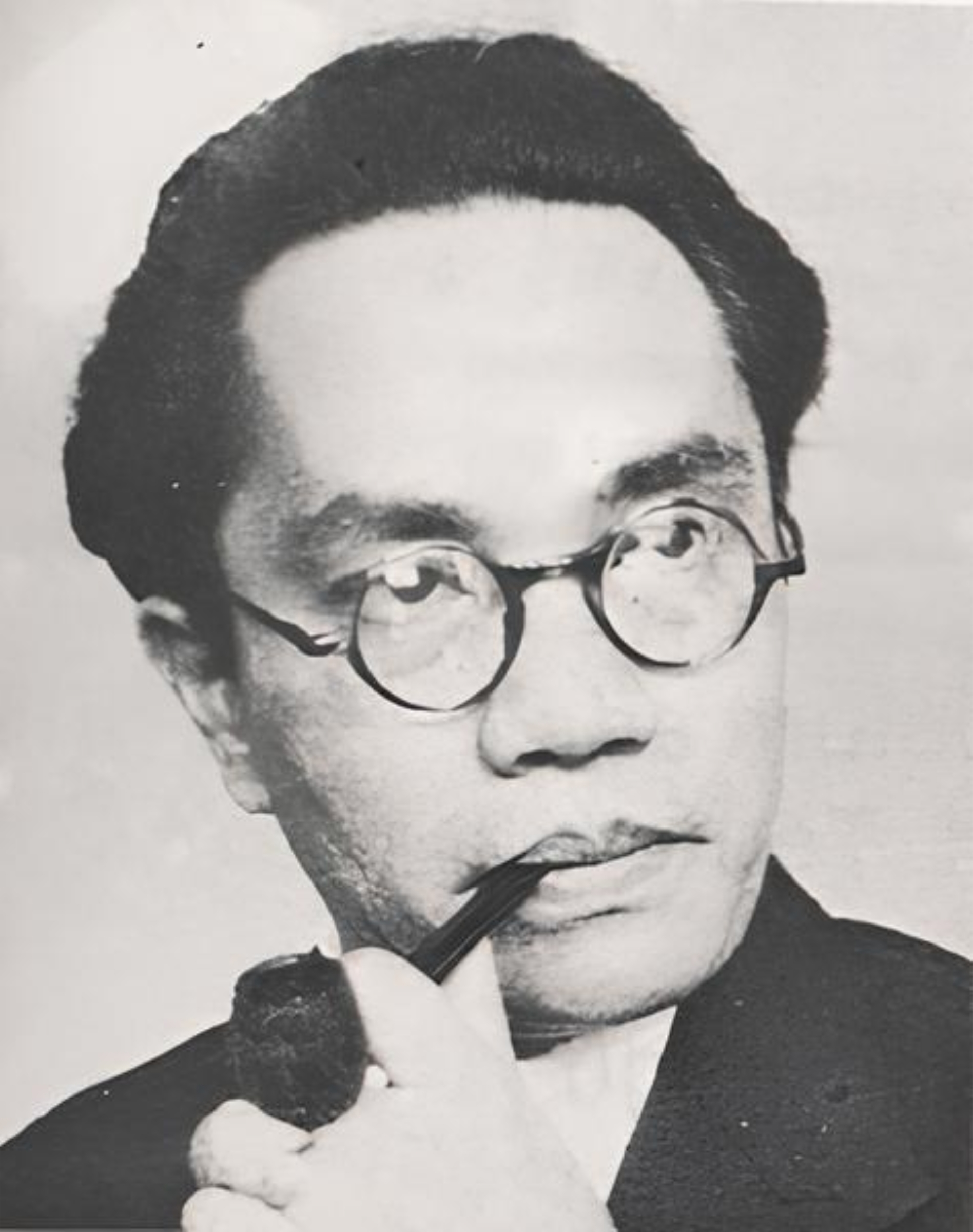
Born into a Muslim Batak family, Indonesian Prime Minister Amir Sjarifuddin converted to Christianity in 1931. He was one of the Indonesian Republic's first leaders.

- Amir Sjarifuddin – Indonesian socialist leader who later became the second prime minister of Indonesia during its National Revolution.
- Aslan Abashidze – former leader of the Ajarian Autonomous Republic in western Georgia.
- Asmirandah – Indonesian actress of Dutch descent converted to Protestantism in December 2013. Zantman owes her conversion to an experience of having dreamed three times of Jesus Christ.
- Aurelius and Natalia – Christian martyrs who were put to death during the reign of Abd ar-Rahman II, Caliph of Córdoba for apostasy.
- Ayaan Hirsi Ali – Somali-born Dutch feminist, writer, and politician.
- Basuki Abdullah – Indonesian painter; converted to Roman Catholicism.
- Begum Samru – powerful lady of north India, ruling a large area from Sardhana, Uttar Pradesh.
- Bob Denard – French soldier and mercenary leader. Converted from Roman Catholicism to Judaism, then Islam and eventually back to Roman Catholicism.
- Broery – Indonesian singer (from Christianity to Islam back to Christianity).

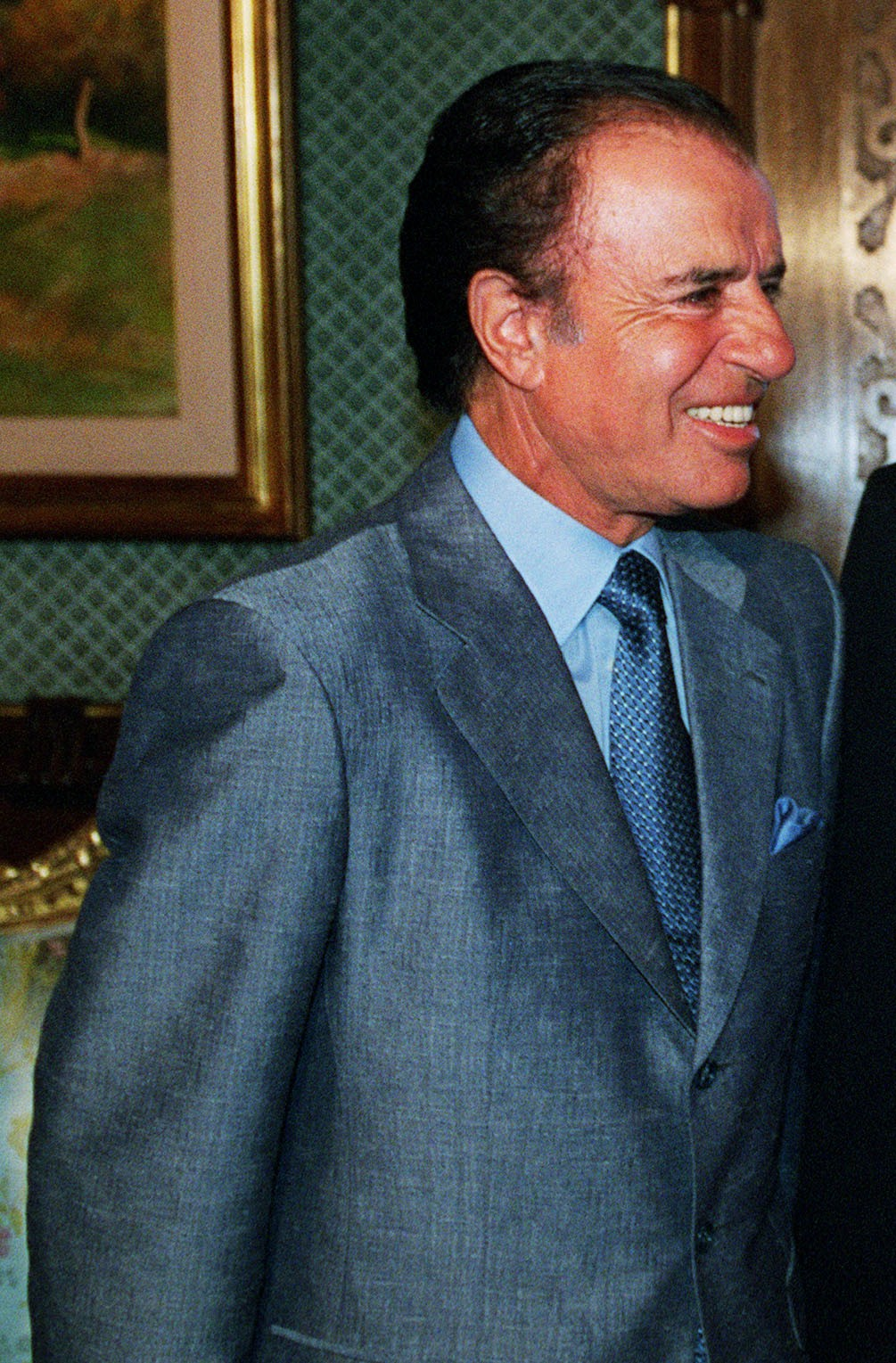
Argentine president Carlos Menem converted to Roman Catholicism due to his political aspirations.

- Brother Rachid – television presenter. He hosts a TV show called Daring Question which focuses on discussing and criticizing Islam.
- Bulus ibn Raja' – Egyptian islamologist who became a monk
- Carlos Menem – former President of Argentina. Raised a Muslim but converted to Roman Catholicism, the majority religion of Argentina, due to his political aspirations (before the 1994 reform, the Argentine Constitution established that the President of the Nation had to be a Roman Catholic).
- Casilda of Toledo – saint of the Roman Catholic Church.
- Chamillionaire – (born Hakeem Seriki) American rapper.
- Chulpan Khamatova – Russian actress.
- Constantine the African – Baghdad-educated Muslim who died in 1087 as a Christian monk at Monte Cassino.
- Daniel Bambang Dwi Byantoro – leader (and Archimandrite) of the Indonesian Orthodox Church.
- Daveed Gartenstein-Ross – counter-terrorism expert and attorney (from Judaism to Islam to Christianity).
- Diana Nasution – Indonesian singer, converted to Protestantism after marriage.
- Djibril Cissé – footballer for club and country.
- Don Juan of Persia – late-16th- and early-17th-century figure in Iran and Spain, converted from Shia Islam to Roman Catholicism.
- Eldridge Cleaver – Conversions/Associations to Nation of Islam then Evangelical Christianity then Mormonism.
- Emily Ruete – (born Sayyida Salme) Princess of Zanzibar and Oman.
- Enrique de Malaca – Malay slave of Ferdinand Magellan, converted to Roman Catholicism after being purchased in 1511.
- Ergun Caner – Swedish-American academic, author, and Baptist minister.
- Estevanico – Berber originally from Morocco and one of the early explorers of the Southwestern United States.
- Fadhma Aït Mansour – mother of French writers Jean Amrouche and Taos Amrouche.
- Fathia Ghali – Egyptian princess and youngest daughter of Fuad I of Egypt and Nazli Sabri.
- Fathima Rifqa Bary – American teenager of Sri Lankan descent who drew international attention in 2009 when she ran away from home and claimed that her Muslim parents might kill her for having converted to Christianity.
- Francis Bok – Sudanese-American activist, convert to Islam from Christianity; but later returned to his Christian faith.
- George Weah – Liberian soccer player (from Christianity to Islam back to Christianity).
- Ghorban Tourani – former Iranian Sunni Muslim who became a Christian minister. Following multiple murder threats, he was abducted and murdered on November 22, 2005.
- Habeeb Hamzat (Peller) – Nigerian online streamer and content creator.
- Hatun Tash – Turkish-born British Christian preacher.
- Hakan Taştan and Turan Topal – two Turkish Christian converts who went on trial in 2006, on charges of "allegedly insulting 'Turkishness' and inciting religious hatred against Islam".
- Hamid Pourmand – former Iranian army colonel and lay leader of the Jama'at-e Rabbani, the Iranian branch of the Assemblies of God church in Iran.
- Hassan Dehqani-Tafti – Anglican Bishop of Iran from 1961 to 1990.
- Ibrahim Ben Ali – soldier, physician and one of the earliest American settlers of Turkish origin.
- Ibrahim Njoya – Bamum people religion; back and forth conversions from Islam to Christianity. Also created his own religion.
- Ibrahim Tunggul Wulung – Indonesian evangelist and missionary.
- Imad ud-din Lahiz – Prolific Islamic writer, preacher and Quranic translator.
- Jabalah ibn al-Aiham – last ruler of the Ghassanid state in Syria and Jordan in the seventh century AD. After the Islamic conquest of Levant he converted to Islam in AD 638. He reverted to Christianity later on and lived in Anatolia until he died in AD 645.
- Jacob Frank – 18th century Jewish religious leader who claimed to be the reincarnation of the self-proclaimed messiah Sabbatai Zevi, and also of King David. Frank publicly converted to Islam in 1757 and later to Christianity at Poland in 1759, but actually presented himself as the Messiah of a syncretic derivation of Shabbatai Zevi's Messianism now referred to as Frankism.
- James Scurry – British soldier and statesman.
- Jean-Bédel Bokassa – Central African Republic Emperor (from Roman Catholicism to Islam back to Roman Catholicism).
- Jessica Iskandar – Indonesian actress and model (from Christianity to Islam back to Christianity).
- Johannes Avetaranian – (born Muhammad Shukri Efendi), Christian missionary and Turkish descendant of Muhammad.
- Josef Mässrur – (born Ghäsim Khan) missionary to Chinese Turkestan with the Mission Union of Sweden.
- Josephine Bakhita – Roman Catholic saint from Darfur, Sudan.
- Julia Volkova – Russian singer and actress best known as a member of the Russian pop duo, t.A.T.u.
- Justinus Darmojuwono – first Indonesian cardinal of the Roman Catholic Church; served as Archbishop of Semarang from 1963 to 1981, and was elevated to the cardinalate in 1967; converted to Catholicism in 1932.
- Kabeer Gbaja-Biamila – American football player
- Kassian Cephas – Indonesian photographer.
- Kiki Fatmala – Arab Indonesian actress.
- Kitty Kirkpatrick – daughter of James Achilles Kirkpatrick, British Resident in Hyderabad and Khair-un-Nissa, a Hyderabadi noblewoman.
- Kyai Sadrach – Indonesian missionary.
- Lakandula – Lakan of the pre-colonial Kingdom of Tondo
- Lina Joy – Javanese Malaysian former Muslim converted to Roman Catholicism. The desire to have her conversion recognized by law was the subject of a court case in Malaysia.
- Lukman Sardi – Indonesian actor converted to Christianity after marriage.
- Lyasan Utiasheva – Russian gymnast, convert to Eastern Orthodox Christianity.

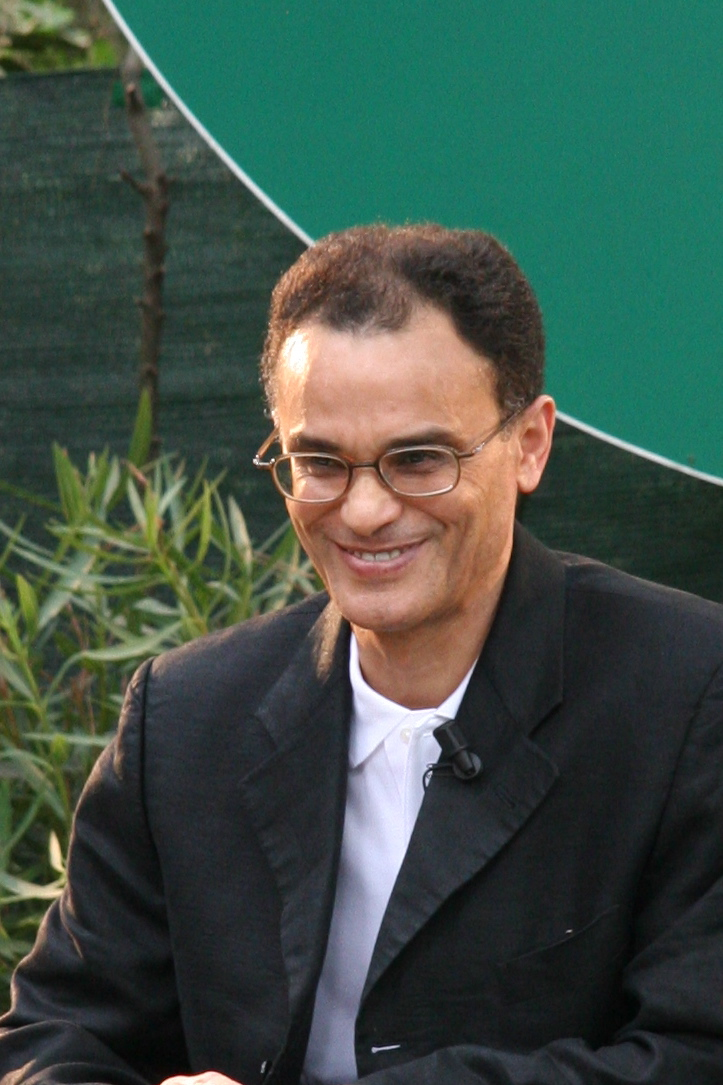
Italian journalist Magdi Allam converted to Roman Catholicism during the Vatican's 2008 Easter vigil service presided over by Pope Benedict XVI, but left the church in 2013.

- Magdi Allam – Italy's most famous Islamic affairs journalist.
- Majeed Rashid Mohammed – Kurdish Christian convert from Islam. He established a network with former Kurdish Muslims with about 2,000 members today.
- Malika Oufkir – author, activist and former prisoner of the Moroccan royal family.
- Manohara Odelia Pinot – Indonesian model and actress. Former wife of Malaysian Kelantanese prince Tengku Muhammad Fakhry Petra.
- Maria Aurora von Spiegel – (born Fatima) was a Turkish mistress of Augustus II the Strong and the wife of a Polish noble.
- Maria Huberdina Hertogh – Dutch-Indonesian child kidnapped and forcibly converted to Islam during the World War II in 1943 by Malay Muslims but was eventually returned to her Catholic family in 1950.
- Maria Temryukovna – Circassian princess, and second wife to Ivan IV of Russia who was born in a Muslim upbringing, and baptised into the Russian Orthodox Church on August 21, 1561.
- Marina Nemat – Canadian author of Iranian descent and former political prisoner of the Iranian government. Born into a Christian family, she converted to Islam in order to avoid execution but later reverted to Christianity.
- Mark A. Gabriel – Egyptian writer
- Mary Fillis
- Mathieu Kérékou – President of Benin (from Christianity to Islam back to Christianity).
- Matthew Ashimolowo – Nigerian-born British pastor and evangelist.
- Mehdi Dibaj – Iranian pastor and Christian activist.
- Mehmet Ali Ağca – Turkish ultra-nationalist assassin, who shot and wounded Pope John Paul II on May 13, 1981. In early 2009, Ağca renounced Islam in prison and announced his intention to convert to the Catholic faith upon release.
- Michał Czajkowski – Polish-Cossack writer and political emigre who worked both for the resurrection of Poland and the reestablishment of a Cossack Ukraine.
- Mohammed Elewonibi – Nigerian-Canadian football player
- Mohammed Hegazy – first Egyptian Muslim convert to Christianity to seek official recognition of his conversion from the Egyptian Government.
- Momolu Dukuly – Liberian foreign minister.
- Mosab Hassan Yousef – son of Sheikh Hassan Yousef, a Hamas founder and one of its leader.
- Moussa Dadis Camara – ex-officer of the Guinean army.
- Muhsin Muhammad – football player for Carolina Panthers
- Nabeel Qureshi – former Ahmadi Muslim and now co-director of Acts 17 Apologetics Ministries. He has given lectures at universities and seminaries throughout North America.
- Nafa Urbach – Indonesian singer, actress and model.
- Nasir Siddiki – Canadian evangelist, author, and business consultant.
- Nazli Sabri – Queen consort of Egypt.
- Nonie Darwish – Egyptian-American writer and public speaker.
- Nur Luke – Uyghur Bible translator.
- Olavo de Carvalho – Brazilian polemicist, philosopher, political pundit, astrologer and journalist.
- Omar ibn Sa'id – Fula writer and Islamic scholar who was enslaved and transported to the United States in 1807.
- Parveen Babi – Indian actress, converted to Christianity during her later life, but buried according to Muslim rites.
- Patrick Sookhdeo – British Anglican canon
- Paul Mulla – Turkish scholar and professor of Islamic Studies at the Pontifical Oriental Institute.
- Pinkan Mambo – (born Pinkan Ratnasari Mambo) Indonesian singer converted in 2010. Decision taken after admitting she studied various religions of the world and eventually dropped in awe of Jesus Christ.
- Qadry Ismail – former American football player.
- Qasim Khanate – some Muslim begs and Khans of the Qasim Khanate converted to Russian Orthodox Christianity.
- Raghib Ismail – former American football player.
- Rajah Humabon – first Filipino Sultan convert to Roman Catholicism in the name of Carlos.
- Rajah Matanda – sovereign of the Kingdom of Maynila
- Rashid Nurgaliyev – Russian politician and general convert to Russian Orthodoxy.
- Rianti Cartwright – Indonesian actress, model, presenter and VJ. Two weeks before departure to the United States to get married, Rianti left the Muslim faith to become a baptized Catholic with the name Sophia Rianti Rhiannon Cartwright.
- Ridvan Aydemir – Turkish-German YouTuber.
- Rotimi Adebari – first Black mayor in Ireland.
- Roy Marten – (born Wicaksono Abdul Salam) Indonesian actor whose family was converted to Roman Catholicism during his childhood but who converted later to Indonesian Orthodoxy in 1997.
- Rudolf Carl von Slatin – Anglo-Austrian soldier and administrator in the Sudan.
- Ruffa Gutierrez – Filipina actress, model and former beauty queen (from Christianity to Islam back to Christianity)
- Sabatina James – Pakistani-Austrian former Muslim and now an Austrian Roman Catholic author.
- Saeed and Nagmeh Abedini
- Saint Alodia and Saint Nunilo – Christian martyrs and confessors who were put to death during the reign of Abd ar-Rahman II, Caliph of Córdoba for apostasy.
- Sarah Balabagan – Filipina who was imprisoned in the United Arab Emirates from 1994 to 1996 for murder. She was initially sentenced to death, but was later returned to the Philippines.
- Sayed Borhan khan – Khan of Qasim Khanate from 1627 to 1679.
- Saye Zerbo – President of the republic of Upper Volta (now Burkina Faso).
- Sheikh Deen Muhammad – (I.E. Sake Dean Mahomed) British Indian traveller, surgeon and entrepreneur who introduced shampooing and the Indian take-away curry house restaurant in Britain, and was the first Indian to have written a book in the English language.
- Shams Pahlavi – Iranian princess and the elder sister of Mohammad Reza Pahlavi, Shah of Iran.
- Sharena Gunawan – Indonesian actress and model. Converted to Christianity after remarried with Indonesian actor Ryan Delon Situmeang.
- The Shihab family – prominent Lebanese noble family. The family originally belonged to Sunni Islam and converted to Maronite Catholicism at the end of the 18th century.
- The Sibirsky family – foremost of many Genghisid (Shaybanid) noble families formerly living in Russia.
- Sigi Wimala – Indonesian model and actress, converted to Catholicism after marriage.
- Simeon Bekbulatovich – Khan of Qasim Khanate.

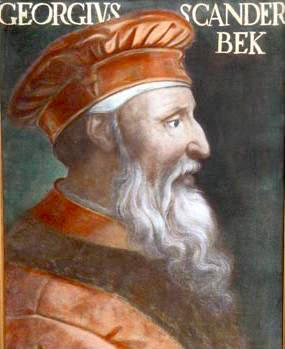
Albanian monarch Skanderbeg converted from Eastern Orthodox Christianity to Islam, but became a Roman Catholic later in life, upon his return to Albania.

- Skanderbeg – Albanian monarch and military leader. Skanderbeg converted to Islam from Christianity but reverted to Christianity later in life.
- Soraya Esfandiary-Bakhtiari – second wife and Queen Consort of Mohammad Reza Pahlavi, the late Shah of Iran who converted to Roman Catholicism.
- Ștefan Răzvan – Gypsy prince who ruled Moldavia for six months in 1595.
- Taysir Abu Saada – former member of the PLO and the founder of the christian ministry Hope For Ishmael after he converted to christianity. He was Yasir Arafat's personal driver.
- Thomas Yayi Boni – President of Benin
- Tunch Ilkin – (born Tunç Ali İlkin) Turkish American sports broadcaster and a former American football player
- Ubayd-Allah ibn Jahsh – brother of Zaynab bint Jahsh, the wife of Muhammad and one of the male Sahaba (companions of the Prophet).
- Udo Ulfkotte – German journalist who was born a Christian, became an atheist, then converted to Islam and finally converted back to Christianity.
- Umar ibn Hafsun – leader of anti-Umayyad dynasty forces in southern Iberia. Hafsun converted to Christianity with his sons and ruled over several mountain valleys for nearly forty years, having the castle Bobastro as his residence.
- Utameshgaray of Kazan – Khan of Kazan Khanate
- Walid Shoebat – American author and self-proclaimed former member of the PLO
- Wu'erkaixi – Uyghur dissident known for his leading role during the Tiananmen protests of 1989.
- Yadegar Moxammat of Kazan (Yadegar Mokhammad of Kazan) – last khan of Kazan Khanate
- Youcef Nadarkhani – Iranian Christian pastor who has been sentenced to death for apostasy.
- Zachariah Anani – former Sunni Muslim Lebanese militia fighter
- Zaida of Seville – refugee Andalusian Muslim princess who was a mistress and then perhaps queen of Alfonso VI of Castile

== Religious founders ==
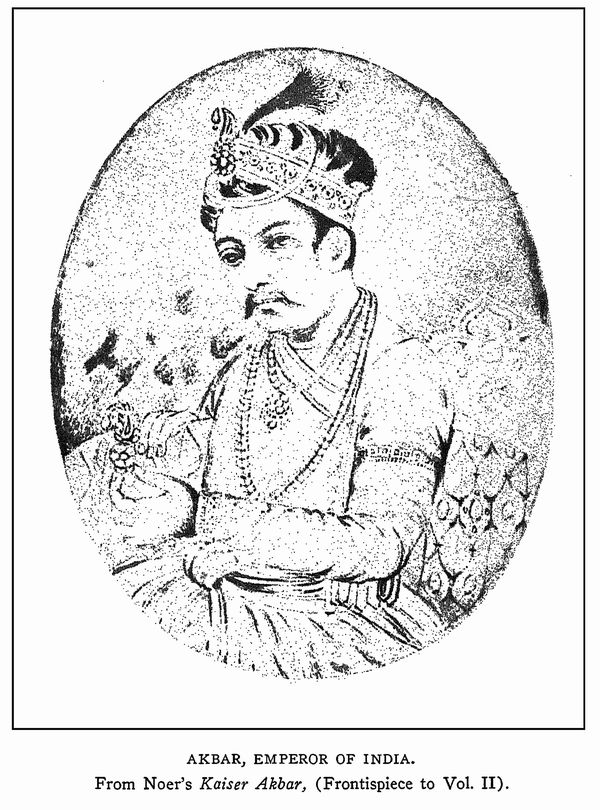
- Mughal emperor Akbar proclaimed that no single religion possessed the absolute truth. This inspired him to create the Din-i Ilahi in 1581.
  Akbar the Great – Mughal emperor and founder of Din-i Ilahi, a religious movement whose followers never numbered more than 19 adherents, although Akbar never renounced Islam publicly or privately, and modern scholars have argued that it was a spiritual discipleship program rather than a new religion.
- Ariffin Mohammed – founder of the Sky Kingdom who claimed a unique connection to God. In spite of renouncing Islam in 2001, he stated that there was no restriction on practising your own faith and at the same time belonging to the Sky Kingdom.
- Báb – founder of Bábism. Most of his followers later accepted Bahá'u'lláh and thus joined the Baháʼí Faith.
- Bahá'u'lláh – after the Bab's death, claimed to be the prophet the Báb spoke of, thereby founding the Baháʼí Faith.
- David Myatt – founded the Numinous Way
- Dwight York – African American author, black supremacist leader, musician, convicted child molester and founder of the religious doctrine called Nuwaubianism.
- Kabir – 15th-century mystical poet and founder of the Kabir panth. Born to a Hindu widow but adopted and raised as Muslim by a childless Muslim couple, later denouncing both Hinduism and Islam.
- Riaz Ahmed Gohar Shahi – founder of the spiritual movements Messiah Foundation International and Anjuman Serfaroshan-e-Islam.
- Sultan Sahak – founded Ahl-e Haqq

== See also ==
- Apostasy
- Apostasy in Islam
- Apostasy in Islam by country
- Criticism of Islam
- Ex-Muslims
- List of converts to Islam
- Religious conversion

=== Other apostasy-related lists ===
- List of ex-Muslim organisations
- List of former Jews
- List of former atheists and agnostics
- List of former Protestants
- List of former Catholics
- List of former or dissident Mormons
- List of former Christians
