= Labidi =

Labidi (Arabic: العبيدي) is an Arabic surname, occurring mainly in Tunisia. Notable people with the surname include:

- Ahmed Labidi, Tunisian long-distance runner
- Chiheb Labidi, Tunisian footballer
- Hamdi Labidi, Tunisian footballer
- Khemais Labidi, Tunisian footballer and football manager
- Lilia Labidi, Tunisian anthropologist, feminist and politician
- Massin Kevin Labidi, Tunisian-Dutch atheist activist
- Meherzia Labidi Maïza, Tunisian politician
- Mohsen Labidi, Tunisian footballer
- Nadia Labidi, Algerian film producer, film director, and politician
- Najma Kousri Labidi, Tunisian feminist and LGBT-rights activist
- Néziha Labidi, Tunisian politician
- Samir Labidi, Tunisian politician
- Sofiane Labidi, Tunisian sprinter and coach
- Wahid Labidi, Tunisian World Scout Committee member
- Zakarie Labidi, French footballer

== See also ==
- Labidi Ayachi, Tunisian middle-distance runner
