= List of converts to Hinduism =

The following is a list of converts to Hinduism from other religions or a non-religious background.

== From Abrahamic religions ==
=== Christianity ===
- Annie Jobbie (also known as Chitra Shaji Kailash) – Indian actress
- Agehananda Bharati – German Indologist
- M. Chandra – Indian Politician
- Sister Christine – German-American educationist and disciple of Swami Vivekananda
- Alice Coltrane – American jazz musician
- James Cousins (also known as Jayaram) – Irish-Indian writer and Theosophist
- Alain Daniélou – French Indologist
- Bhagavan Das – (born Kermit Michael Riggs) – American yogi
- Savitri Devi – French-born Greek Nazi activist, writer and German spy
- Verrier Elwin – British Christian missionary who converted to Hinduism in 1935 under the influence of Mahatma Gandhi
- Alfred Ford – American businessman
- David Frawley – American writer, Ayurveda practitioner, astrologer and Hindutva proponent
- Sister Gargi – American writer and disciple of Swami Ashokananda of Ramakrishna Mission
- François Gautier – French political writer, journalist and Hindutva proponent
- Trevor Hall – American musician
- George Harrison – Lead guitarist of The Beatles and solo-artist, follower of ISKCON
- David Ananda Hart – British theologian
- Christopher Isherwood – American novelist and disciple of Swami Prabhavananda of Ramakrishna Mission
- Jomol – Indian actress
- Kirtanananda Swami (born as Keith Gordon Ham) – Gaudiya Vaishnav guru and founder of New Vrindaban; raised as a Baptist
- Lissy – Indian actress
- Jeffery D. Long – American scholar of religious studies; converted from Catholicism
- Dharma Mittra – Brazilian yoga teacher; raised in a Catholic family
- Nayanthara – Indian actress
- Sister Nivedita– British-Irish writer, educationist, Indian independence activist and disciple of Swami Vivekananda
- Ranchor Prime – British author and Hindu religious scholar; was raised as a Roman Catholic
- Julia Roberts – American actress
- Sonia Sahni – Indian actress
- Satyananda Stokes – American former Evangelist and Indian independence activist
- E. C. George Sudarshan – American theoretical physicist
- John Woodroffe – British Indologist
- Yadunandana Swami – (born as Javier Pera López) – Spanish adherent of ISKCON; previously a Roman Catholic
- Ieva Zasimauskaitė – Lithuanian Singer
- Carol Gabbard – mother of United States politician Tulsi Gabbard

=== Islam ===
- Zubeida Begum — Indian actress
- Ashalata Biswas — Indian actress
- Asha Sachdev — Indian actress
- Annapurna Devi — Indian surbahar (bass sitar) player of Hindustani classical music
- Harilal Gandhi — Son of Mahatma Gandhi
- Sati Kazanova — Russian singer
- Aashish Khan — Indian classical musician
- Editor Mohan — Indian film editor
- Nargis — Indian actress, politician, and social worker who converted upon marriage to actor Sunil Dutt
- Ramasimhan — Indian film director
- Raskhan — Sufi poet
- Syed Waseem Rizvi — Former member and chairman of the Shia Central Waqf Board of Uttar Pradesh
- Happy Salma — Indonesian actress, converted and became member of the Lordship of Ubud after marriage
- Salabega — Odia poet
- Anwar Shaikh — British–Pakistani writer
- Ifa Sudewi — Indonesian chief judge for the 2002 Bali bombing trials
- Sukmawati Sukarnoputri — Daughter of Indonesia's founding father and first president Sukarno
- Haridas Thakura — Prominent Vaishnavite saint, instrumental in the early appearance and spread of the Gaudiya Vaishnavism movement
- Zubeida — Indian actress

=== Judaism ===
- Ram Dass (born Richard Alpert) (1931–2019) – syncretist, and follower of the Hindu deity Hanuman. Professor of psychology at Harvard University.
- Tamal Krishna Goswami (born Thomas G. Herzig) (1946–2002) – governing body commissioner of the International Society for Krishna Consciousness.
- Lora Logic (b. 1960) – punk rock saxophonist with Poly Styrene's X-Ray Spex.
- Radhanath Swami (born Richard Slavin) (b. 1950) – prominent Bhakti yoga guru and a governing body commissioner of the International Society for Krishna Consciousness.

== From other Indian-origin religions ==
This is list of converts from Indian-origin religions.

=== Buddhism ===
- Mihirakula (r. c. 502 – c. 530) – Huna ruler.
- Rajasinghe I (c. 1544–1593) – Sri Lankan king who conquered Kandy.
- Rishabhadatta (1st/2nd century CE) – Satrap viceroy.
- Rudradaman I (r. 130–150) – Satrap ruler and conqueror of the Satavahanas.
- Vasudeva I (r. c. 191 – c. 232) – Kushan king
- Jayavarman III (r. c. 835 – c. 877) - Prince

=== Jainism ===
- Mahendravarman I (r. 600–630) – Pallava King and patron of the arts.
- Vishnuvardhana (r. c. 1108 – c. 1152) – King of Hoysala empire and prominent temple-builder.
- Tirunavukkarasar (c. 6th–7th century CE) – Saivite saint and one of the most prominent of the sixty-three Nayanars.

== Other ==
=== Other theist converts ===
- Mihirakula (r. c. 502–530) – Huna ruler.
- Heliodorus (c. 2nd century BCE) – Greek minister to King Bhagabhadra.
- Pamheiba (1690–1751) – Manipuri King
- Suhungmung (r. 1497–1539) – Ahom kingdom's ruler who extended Assam up to the Kamarupa Kingdom
- Supangmung (r. 1663–1670) – Ahom kingdom's ruler who recaptured Guwahati. Converted to Vaishnavism.
- Susenghphaa (r. 1603–1641) – Ahom king; during his rule the Ahom-Mughal conflicts began

=== Non-theistic converts ===
- Annie Besant – British socialist, theosophist, women's rights activist, writer, orator, and supporter of both Irish and Indian self-rule.
- John Dobson (former atheist who became a believer in Vedanta) – astronomer and telescope designer.
- Sita Ram Goel (former atheist) – Indian commentator, writer and Hindu activist.
- Chrissie Hynde (born 7 September 1951) is an American musician. She is a founding member and the lead vocalist, guitarist, and primary songwriter of the garage rock new wave band the Pretenders.
- Poly Styrene (3 July 1957 – 25 April 2011), singer with one of Britain's earliest punk rock bands, X-Ray Spex; earlier religious affiliation unknown (Poly Styrene had one Sudanese parent, possibly Muslim, and one British parent of unknown religion) .

=== Converts from undetermined former religion ===
- Agehananda Bharati (born Leopold Fischer) (1923–1991) – academic Sanskritist, a prolific author about religious subjects, and a Hindu monk in the Dasanami Sannyasi order.
- Alain Daniélou – French historian, intellectual, musicologist, and Indologist.
- Crispian Mills of Kula Shaker – Hare Krishna devotee. His initiated name is Krishna Kantha Dasa. He was initiated by Narayana Maharaja. He wrote a foreword to a book by Bhaktivinoda Thakur titled Sri Siksastaka.
- Geoffrey Giuliano – American biographer.
- Nina Hagen (follower of Haidakhan Babaji) – German singer.
- Joe Don Looney (follower of Swami Muktananda) – football player.
- J Mascis – lead vocalist, guitarist, and drummer for Dinosaur Jr.
- John McLaughlin (became a disciple of Sri Chinmoy) – jazz fusion guitar player.
- Lex Hixon (syncretist and disciple of Swami Nikhilananda) – poet, philosopher, spiritual practitioner and teacher.
- Sati Kazanova, Russian singer.
- Savitri Devi (born Maximiani Portas) – Greek-French writer and Nazi-sympathiser.
- Savitri Khanolkar (born Eve Yvonne Maday de Maros) – designer of India's highest gallantry award, the Param Vir Chakra.
- Mathias Rust – German daredevil pilot.
- Kelli Williams – American actress who played Lindsay Dole Donnell on the ABC legal drama The Practice.
- Sherlyn Chopra - Indian actress.

== See also ==
- Category:Converts to Hinduism
  - List of converts to Hinduism from Christianity
  - List of converts to Hinduism from Buddhism
- List of former Hindus
  - List of converts to Christianity from Hinduism
  - List of converts to Buddhism from Hinduism
