= Anwar Shaikh =

Anwar Shaikh may refer to:

- Anwar Shaikh (writer) (1928–2006), British India-born British writer
- Anwar Shaikh (economist) (1945–2026), Pakistani American heterodox economist
