= Les Scouts Tunisiens =

National Scouting organization of Tunisia

- The Tunisian Scouts
- Country: Tunisia
- Founded: 1934
- Membership: 32,000
- Affiliation: World Association of Girl Guides and Girl Scouts, World Organization of the Scout Movement
- Website scouts-tunisiens.org

Les Scouts Tunisiens (in Tunisian Arabic: الكشافة التونسية; The Tunisian Scouts) is the national Scouting organization of Tunisia. It was founded in 1934, and became a member of the World Organization of the Scout Movement in 1957 and is also a full member of the World Association of Girl Guides and Girl Scouts. The coeducational Scouts Tunisiens has about 32,000 members (24,080 Scouts and 8,582 Guides). The Girl Guides are an integral but independent section of Les Scouts Tunisiens.

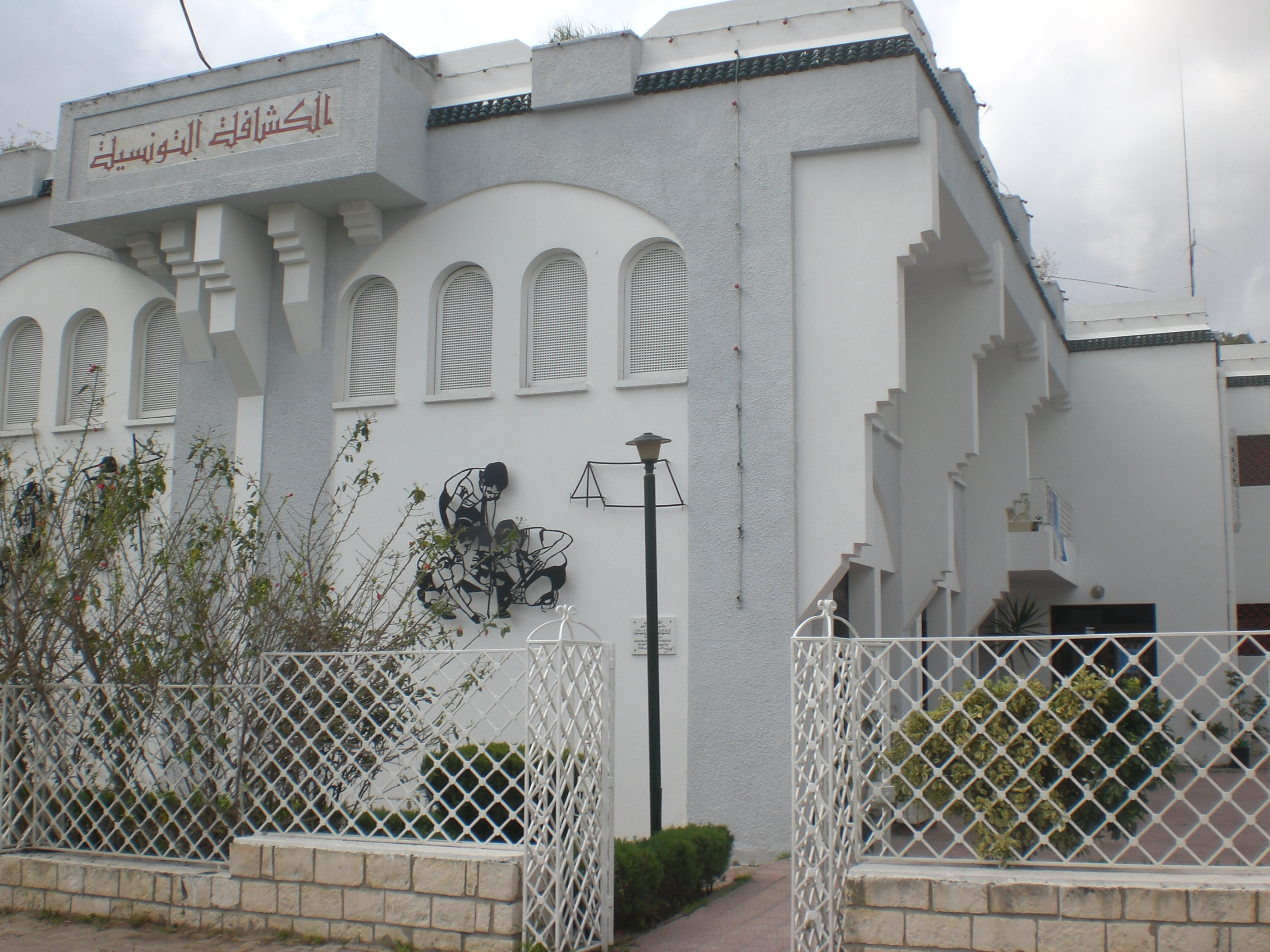
Headquarters of Les Scouts Tunisiens

The French brought Scouting to the country for children of French military and other citizens prior to 1933.

In 1976, Abdallah Zouaghi was awarded the Bronze Wolf, the only distinction of the World Organization of the Scout Movement, awarded by the World Scout Committee for exceptional services to world Scouting.

The 2005 World Scout Conference was held in Hammamet.

Les Scouts Tunisiens is known for its citizenship training through community service. Tunisian Scouting is an independent youth movement, under the guardianship of the Ministry of Youth and Sports. It receives moral support as well as financial support and equipment. They also are able to use public youth centers for their activities.

Service activities include planting trees, construction of schools and hospitals, providing recreation for children in orphanages, literacy campaigns and disaster relief.

== Program and sections ==
Badge of the Tunisian Girl Guides

- Louveteaux/Cub Scouts-ages 7 to 12
- Eclaireurs/Scouts-ages 12 to 16
- Raiders-ages 16 to 18
- Routiers/Rovers-ages 18 and older

The Scout Motto is Kun Musta'idan or كن مستعدا, translating as Be Prepared in Arabic and Sois Prêt, translating as Be Prepared in French. The noun for a single Scout is Kashaf or كشاف in Arabic and Tunisian Arabic.

== See also ==
- Wahid Labidi
