= Ridvan Aydemir =

Turkish-German ex-Muslim YouTuber

Apostate Prophet
- Born: Ridvan Aydemir; February 8, 1991 (age 35); Germany
- Occupation: YouTuber

YouTube information
- Years active: 2017–present
- Genre: Religion
- Subscribers: 613 thousand
- Views: 141 million

Ridvan Aydemir is a Turkish-German ex-Muslim activist and YouTuber known for his critiques of Islam under the pseudonym Apostate Prophet. He announced his conversion from atheism to Eastern Orthodox Christianity in 2025.

== Early life and education ==
Aydemir was born in Germany to Turkish Muslim parents and later moved to Turkey in 2006 during his teenage years. There, he completed high school and mandatory military service. Initially a devout Sunni Muslim, Aydemir became deeply engaged in Islamic theology, but eventually left Islam after critical examination of its teachings. His apostasy led to personal and social consequences, including strained relationships with his family and community. Additionally, Aydemir has faced lawsuits in Turkey for his criticism of Islam.

== Career ==
In 2017, he launched his YouTube channel, Apostate Prophet, where he critiques Islamic doctrines and addresses issues related to apostasy and freedom of belief. He frequently collaborates with Christian apologist David Wood and has participated in public debates with Muslim apologists such as Mohammed Hijab and Daniel Haqiqatjou.

Identifying as an atheist and affiliating with Atheist Alliance International for a period of around ten years, Aydemir announced his conversion to Eastern Orthodox Christianity in 2025. In July 2025, he delivered a speech at Turning Point USA's Student Action Summit in Tampa, Florida, discussing the incompatibility of Islam with freedom of expression.

During the Gaza war, Ridvan Aydemir became a staunch supporter of Israel. Muslim Skeptic, an online dawah blog of US muslim scholar and YouTuber Daniel Haqiqatjou, published an article in 2023 accusing him of supporting the Palestinian genocide.

In 2024, the ex-Muslim YouTuber Apostate Aladdin criticized Aydemir for his conduct as a prominent representative of the ex-Muslim movement, resulting in a brief but intense dispute between both individuals.
