= Daniel Haqiqatjou =

American Muslim commentator and debater (born 1980)

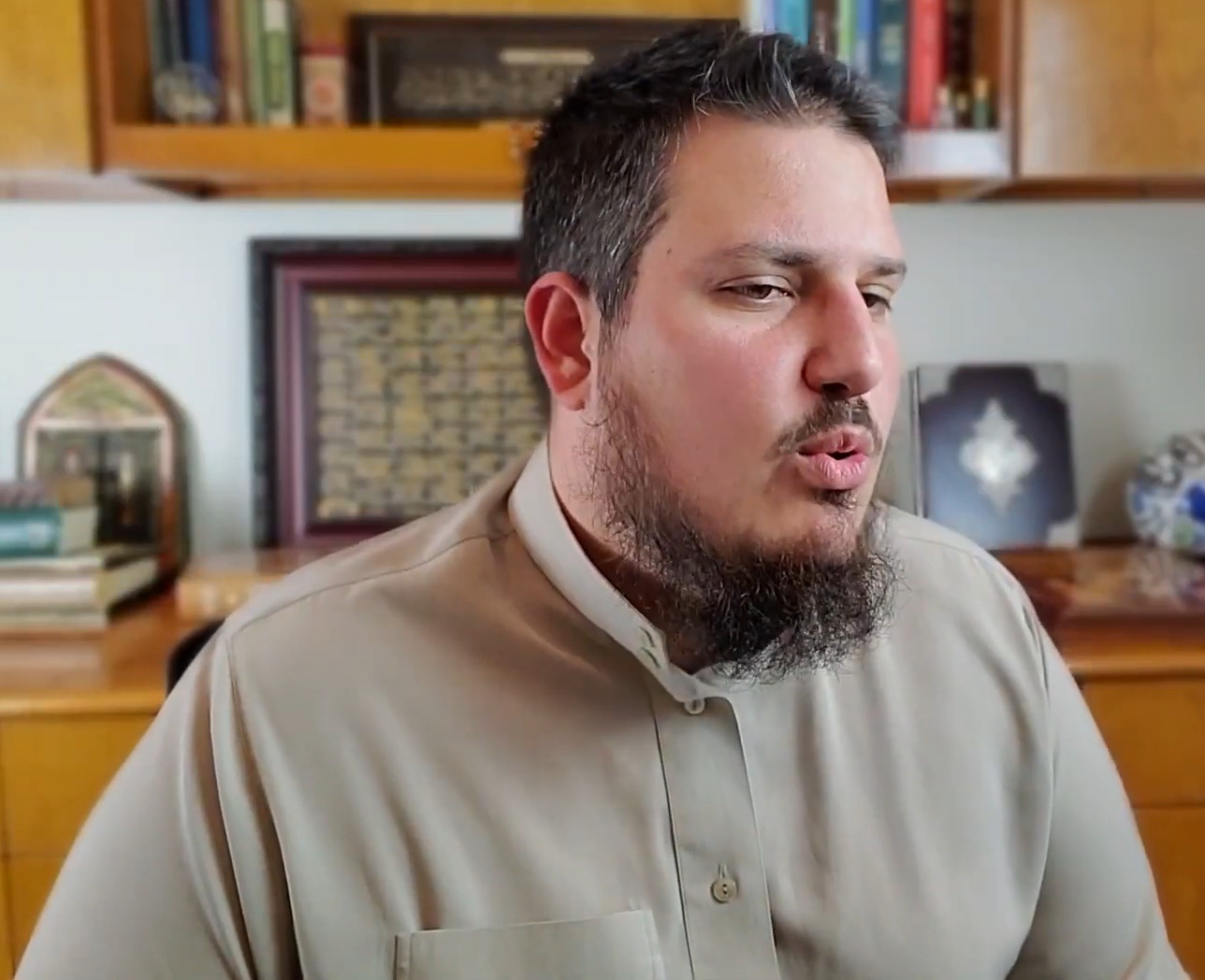
- Haqiqatjou in 2020

Personal life
- Born: Daniel Reza Haghighat Jou; 1985 or 1986 (age 40–41) Houston, Texas, U.S.
- Education: Harvard University (AB); Tufts University (MA)
- Known for: Critiques of modernism, debates and comparative religion
- Website: muslimskeptic.com

Religious life
- Religion: Islam
- Denomination: Sunni

YouTube information
- Channel: The Muslim Skeptic
- Years active: 2015–present
- Subscribers: 459,000
- Views: 162.7 million

Daniel Reza Haghighat Jou (born 1985 or 1986), known professionally as Daniel Haqiqatjou, is an American Muslim religious and political commentator and debater associated with the "Muslim manosphere".

== Early life ==
Haqiqatjou was born in Houston, Texas, to Iranian parents in a secular family of Shia background. He was raised in Houston, where he currently resides.

During high school, Haqiqatjou converted from Shia Islam to Sunni Islam. In 2008, he graduated from Harvard University with a degree in physics and a minor in philosophy, before completing a master's degree in philosophy at Tufts University.

== Career ==
From 2014 to 2017, he was a writer for the online magazine MuslimMatters. In 2015, he founded the website Muslim Skeptic and created a YouTube channel of the same name, focusing primarily on interfaith criticism, modernism, current events, family issues, and reports on figures whom Haqiqatjou has accused of attempting to change Islam from within. The Middle East Forum characterized Haqiqatjou as a Texas-based Islamist and Muslim Skeptic as an Islamist website. In 2016, according to Influence Watch, Haqiqatjou published an article on Muslim Skeptic questioning whether democratic forms of government produce just governance, criticizing majority rule as an unreliable basis for determining moral questions.

In 2019, Haqiqatjou founded the Alasna Institute, an online Islamic seminary offering courses on traditional Islamic disciplines and critiques of ideologies it considers modernist or un-Islamic. The following year, Haqiqatjou authored The Modernist Menace to Islam.

His company Global Ummah Retreats promises to teach men how to "defend your home against feminism". Sahar Ghumkhor and Hizer Mir analyzed Haqiqatjou as an example of what they term the "Alt-Wallah", a category of thought they place at the intersection of a supposed crisis of masculinity, the alt-right, and Muslim men.

== Views and controversies ==
Haqiqatjou has been accused of misogyny and antisemitism many times, including by the ADL. He has said that women getting college educations leads them into sex work. His “Interfaith Critiques” discuss Jewish texts and seek to show that they justify racial hatred, homophobia and criminal conspiracy.

Haqiqatjou is a strong critic of Israel. In 2017 Haqiqatjou compared Israel and its Prime Minister Benjamin Netanyahu to Nazi Germany and Adolf Hitler.

In 2019, he said that Israel occupied Palestinian television stations and broadcast pornographic images, describing Israel's alleged "promotion of base desires" as a "weapon that the agents of Shaytan (Satan) are using in full force today." He alleged that Senator Ilhan Omar has "Zionist masters" and "Zionists control every level of U.S. government." He applauded Brunei for implementing "Islamic laws that would allow death by stoning for adultery and homosexuality", calling it "just the news to cheer you up" and describing homosexuals as "sodomites and fornicators".

In 2020, Haqiqatjou's invitation by the Muslim Students Association (MSA) to speak at York University was criticised by the Jewish Defence League, Friends of Simon Wiesenthal Center, Canadian Antisemitism Education Foundation and professors at York, arguing that Haqiqatjou was "known for anti-Semitic and homophobic rhetoric."

In 2019 and 2020, a public dispute took place between Haqiqatjou and Omar Suleiman's Yaqeen Institute over the institute's approach to contemporary social issues, particularly LGBT-related topics. A talk at a Mississauga community centre was cancelled as a result of these criticisms.

In 2023, according to Middle East Eye, Haqiqatjou's invitation from MSA branches to several New York colleges sparked controversy among some of its Muslim students due to his controversial and allegedly misogynistic opinions, namely his views on gender roles and women's education.

In March 2024, the Jerusalem Post described Haqiqatjou as promoting conspiracy theories, including about 911, and the Anti-Defamation League said he has engaged in antsemitism and has pushed conspiracy theories, extremist, prejudiced, misogynistic, and anti-LGBTQ+ rhetoric.

In Spring 2024, a speech by Haqiqatjou at the MSA branch at Queens College, City University of New York was condemned by the college president, alleging antisemitism. Reporting on this, Jerusalem News Syndicate alleged that Haqiqatjou has said that Israel created ISIS and was involved in the September 11 terror attacks, and that he has defended sexual violence, quoting him as saying "there is no rape if the husband or wife touches a spouse sexually, as this is their right (by virtue of marriage) regardless of consent (on the part of the touched spouse)", and "there is no rape if a master sexually touches his female slave, as the master has a right to do this (by virtue of ownership)."

Following the September 2025 assassination of conservative activist Charlie Kirk, the Middle East Forum reported that Haqiqatjou suggested on X that Israeli Prime Minister Benjamin Netanyahu had ordered the killing and portrayed Kirk as a likely victim of a "Zionist conspiracy", despite Kirk's support for Israel.

In September 2026, amid a renewed escalation between Yemen's Houthi movement and Saudi Arabia , Haqiqatjou sparked controversy after posting an image of the Makkah Clock Tower on X (formerly known as Twitter) alongside a message calling on Yemen to "demolish it"; the post was subsequently deleted, but screenshots continued to circulate online. The post drew criticism online, with users objecting to a call to demolish a landmark located within the Haram area. Haqiqatjou subsequently continued to defend the call for the Clock Tower's demolition, while maintaining that his remarks concerned the Clock Tower specifically rather than the Ka'abah or the Grand Mosque despite the Clock Towers being part of the King Abdulaziz Endowment Project, the disbursements of which are meant to service and benefit the Masjid al-Haram

== Personal life ==
Haqiqatjou has been married to Egyptian-born Umm Khalid since 2008; the two met at Harvard University. They have five children.

On June 23, 2007, Haqiqatjou's sister, Donna Jou, a 19-year-old student at San Diego State University, disappeared after attending a party in Los Angeles at the home of convicted sex offender John Steven Burgess, who invited her through Craigslist using an alias. Burgess was charged with involuntary manslaughter after he told police that she had died of an overdose resulting from drugs he had given her and that he had subsequently disposed of her body in the ocean. Jou's body was never recovered.

== See also ==
- Atharism
- Biblical criticism
- Criticism of Modernism
- Islamic apologetics
- Islamic fundamentalism
- Islamic-Jewish relations
