= Samir Labidi =

Tunisian politician

Samir Labidi (born 1962) is a Tunisian politician. He is the former Communications Minister. Prior to this, he was the Minister of Youth, Sports, and Physical Education.

== Biography ==
Samir Labidi was born on January 8, 1962, in Gafsa, Tunisia. He was the Secretary General for the Union Générale des Etudiants de Tunisie, the Tunisia student union, and worked as a lawyer at The Hague.

He was the Tunisian Ambassador to the United Nations in Geneva, the World Trade Organization, and to the Conference on Disarmament. In 2005, he was involved with the World Summit on the Information Society. He was the president of the Ambassadors of the Arab League in 2006, president of the African Ambassadors to the International Organization for Migration in 2007, and president of the Conference on Disarmament in 2008.

In 2008, he became the Tunisian Minister for Youth and Sports. Later, he became the Communications Minister.
