= Mansiya V. P. =

Indian classical dancer (born 1995)

Mansiya V. P. (born 1995;) is an Indian dancer who specialises in the Bharatanatyam form of Indian classical dance. She has pursued her career in dancing, despite facing social ostracism by orthodox among Muslims on account of her dancing while being a non-Hindu. She has also faced exclusion from some Hindu temples.

In December 2022, Mansiya was elected as one of the 26 members of the council of Kerala Sangeetha Nataka Akademi.

== Early life and education ==
Mansiya was born in 1995 in Velluvampuram, Malappuram, to Syed Alavikutty and Amina V. P. She has an elder sister, Rubiya, who is also a dancer. During her childhood, Mansiya's father worked abroad in Saudi Arabia, but he supported his wife's interest in having his daughters study traditional dance. Alavikutty was not religious, though his wife was Muslim. When he returned to India, he worked in a travel agency. They raised their daughters with a non-conformist, secular outlook and were open-minded in ensuring that their daughters would receive exposure to varied religious traditions. The daughters studied the Quran in a Madrasah and were taught from both Hindu and Christian religious texts at home.

Both sisters attended public school and Veeran Haji High School. Rubiya went on to earn a post graduate degree from Annamalai University of Chidambaram and became a dance teacher. Mansiya completed her under-graduate studies at N.S.S College, Manjeri and went on to get a first division M.A. in Bharatnatyam from the University of Madras.

== Dance ==
'My art is my God and the stage is my temple':

"... I don't believe in any religion. But I believe in God... My strength is my art and practicing my art is my puja... Just before we perform, we touch the stage in obeisance. That's because the stage is our temple and what we perform is our God.... in a temple, before every performance I pray to the deity from outside and prostrate in front of Him. ..."

~ Mansiya V.P. in interview with Shobha Warrier on Rediff

Despite difficult circumstances and acute social ostracism due to prevailing religious conservatism, both daughters were enrolled in Indian classical dance classes since age of three and encouraged to pursue and continue their dance career along with regular education. They studied various classical forms of Indian dances including Bharatnatyam, Kuchipudi, Mohiniyattam, Kerala Nadanam and Kathakali. Their teachers included Sarojini in Manjeri, RLV Anand, Bharatanjali Sasi, and Puthur Pramodh Das, among others. From 2005 to 2012, Mansiya regularly participated in the Kerala state school festivals (class VIII to XII) and won prizes for her Mohiniyattom performances. She was twice awarded the "Kalathilakam", an award for the best female performer, at the annual youth festival of the University of Calicut. She has experimented with choreographing a fusion of classical Bharatnatyam with traditional Sufi music.

== Social ostracism ==
According to a report by Haritha John in The News Minute, the family was ostracized from the local community due to Islam being against public appearances by post puberty women. Stage performances are a taboo subject among conservative Kerala Muslim community and even the application of makeup for a dance performance is frowned upon. According to Megha Varier, the sister's father Alavikutty was already detested in their community for being a theatre artist and the family was shunned for not following Burkha. Varier says putting up with contesting questions by the daughters to Madrasah teachers exacerbated the situation. John says social ostracism in her Muslim community results in her and her family regularly being excluded from community public functions and events. Varier's report adds that there is a denial of social and financial help even during serious illness to any of their family members as the result of their secular lifestyle. John says the Mansiya and Rubiya sister duo have been attacked and faced abuses while walking on the road. Their own relatives and friends told them that they would end up in hell since they dance on the stage. The sisters faced neglect both at school and at the madrassa even from teachers who shunned them. As a result of all of this, the sisters had few friends. John adds that Mansiya even faced death threats while the community did not allow her mother Amina's burial because the sister duo perform Indian classical dances.

According to Manoj Viswanathan, while Mansiya's own Islam community ostracized her family, some Hindu temples allowed her to perform at their premises even though she was not a Hindu and had declared herself to be irreligious.. A few temples, such as the Guravayoor Temple and Koodalmanikyam Temple (Thrissur district Kerala), declined dance performance opportunities due to individual temple regulations on admittance of non-Hindus to temple grounds. Some politicians and dancers expressed their disappointment over some Hindu temples not giving performance opportunities to non-Hindu dancers.

According to Nikhila Henry, similar exclusionary practices were adopted by the church in the case of Soumya Sukumaran, another Bharatanatyam dancer. Sukumaran's family's church shuns her for being a dancer.
