= Wahid Labidi =

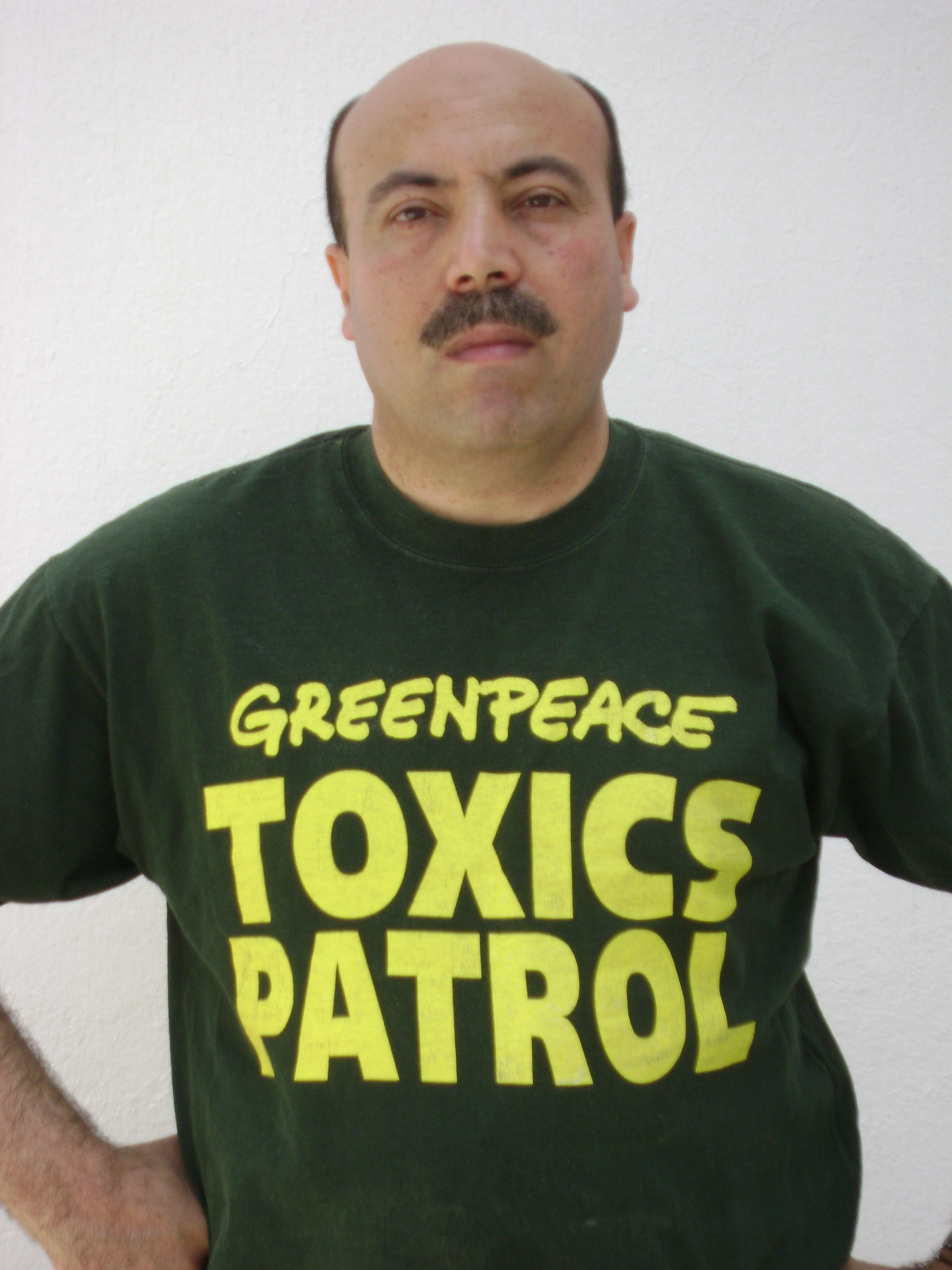
- Born: 24 December 1960 (age 65)

Wahid Labidi (Arabic: وحيد العبيدي, born 24 December 1960 ) of Tunisia was the vice-chairman of the World Scout Committee, the main executive body of the World Organization of the Scout Movement, and chairman of its World Conference Organizing Committee. Professionally, Labidi is a political and economic consultant, specializing in Arab Civil Society, and the promotion of democracy and human rights.

Labidi is a former senior political advisor for Greenpeace International, and the toxics campaigner for Greenpeace Tunisia. He also serves as Political and Economic Specialist for the Middle East Partnership Initiative (MEPI).

Labidi studied biology at the Tunisian University of Sciences as an undergraduate, and then took his Masters in the same institution and subject. He went on to research genetics, also at the Tunisian University of Sciences and gained a secondary school teaching certificate. Between 1991 and 1992, Labidi was a secondary school teacher and educational advisor.

He was a Students' union leader for the Faculty of Sciences, between 1980 and 1984. He was also an Educational Union board member (Labor Union) between 1988 and 1992.

== Scouting ==
Labidi represented the Scouts at the Tunisian National Youth Council, having been active in Scouting since 1968 without interruption. He holds the "4 Wood Badges" (Trainer of Trainers in Scouting). He was elected as board member of the Les Scouts Tunisiens for 6 mandates (1988–2008).

Labidi served as the chairman of the Community Development Committee of the Arab Scout Region of WOSM from 1999–2007. He also served as chairman of the organizing committee of the 37th World Scout Conference in Tunisia in 2005. Labidi participated in the World Jamboree's Organizing committee (Thailand 2003). He has also attended the 35th, 36th and 37th World Scout Conferences and four Arab Scout Conferences. He is a member of the World Scouting GRTF (Governance Review Task Force) and has chaired delegations to more than ten regional and international youth events between 1982–2002. In 2017, he was awarded the 355th Bronze Wolf, the only distinction of the World Organization of the Scout Movement, awarded by the World Scout Committee for exceptional services to world Scouting.

=== Scout honors and awards ===
- Scouting Meritorious Honor Award: Highest and most prestigious Tunisian Scouts award
- Scout award from the World Scout Bureau (September 2005)
- Gold Medal awarded by the Tunisian Environment protection Agency for Beach Cleaning projects
- "Nature's Best Friend" Award, granted by the Arab Bird Protection Association
- Youth Superior Award, granted by the Tunisian Ministry of Youth and Sports
