= Amina Dawood Al-Mufti =

Jordanian spy for the Israeli Mossad

Amina Dawoud Mohammed Al-Mufti or Onya Moshe Perrad (Arabic: أمينة داود محمد المفتي; 1939–2008) was a Circassian-Jordanian spy for the Israeli Mossad, who left Islam and converted to Judaism. She was arrested by the secular-nationalist Fatah in 1975, where she remained for nearly five years in detention in Southern Lebanon, until she was released in a prisoner exchange on February 13, 1980.

== Early life ==
Amina Dawood Al-Mufti was born in 1939 in a suburb of Amman. Her family are ethnic Circassians who hold Jordanian citizenship. She held a high political and social position, where her father was a wealthy jewelry merchant and her uncle held the rank of major general in the royal court. Her mother was educated and fluent in four languages, and Amina was the youngest child. In 1957, Amina traveled to Vienna, the capital of Austria, to complete her university studies and obtained a bachelor's degree in medical psychology from the University of Vienna. She returned to Jordan in 1961 and left again for Austria for a doctorate in psychopathology in 1966. Amina then became interested in Judaism. After finding out the person who helped her obtain a fake psychopathology doctorate was Jewish, she decided to convert and marry him. Her husband was an Israeli Air Force pilot with the rank of captain residing in Austria. It was the name of her husband Moshe Perrad that she changed her surname to, after she married him at the Temple of Shimodt in Vienna in 1967.

Amina and her husband immigrated in 1972 to Israel. At the end of January 1973, the Syrian Armed Forces artillery shot down his plane and he was presumed dead after no trace of him was found.

== Mossad service ==
After the loss of her husband, Amina began her spying, believing that she was avenging the loss of her husband. She joined the Mossad, which in turn subjected her to intensive training, then sent to Lebanon to work as a volunteer inside the Palestinian camps. She got in the Palestinian factions, got to know the leaders, and approached them and gained their trust. She lived in Lebanon, specifically in Beirut, and inserted herself in Palestinian shelters with the excuse that she is a volunteer doctor to heal the wounded. She arrived at the office of Yasser Arafat and convinced him that she is a skilled doctor who genuinely wants to help the Palestinians, and she eventually obtained from him a signed permission on a permit that enables her to enter all Palestinian sites as a doctor involved in the rehabilitation of the wounded. She began monitoring the movements of Palestinian leaders, especially Ali Hassan Salameh, who was a frequent customer at the Coral Beach Hotel in Beirut. With the information, she was also able to thwart several Palestinian operations, and got its men arrested before they carried out the operations. She was directing Israeli forces, to bomb Fatah positions in Lebanon while still looking unsuspicious to the Palestinians. Her name was also linked to the Lillehammer affair.

== Arrest and release ==
In September 1975, Fatah arrested Amina after their investigations revealed that she was sending accurate and sensitive information about the PLO and its personnel and their locations to Israel. Abu Al-Hassan, a PLO official, asked that Amina would not be executed, but Arafat refused, saying she would only be safe if she was exchanged for Palestinian prisoners. After her full confession, she was kept detained for five years in a cave near the city of Sidon, until she was exchanged with two Palestinian prisoners held in Israel, Mehdi Bseiso and William Nassar, on February 13, 1980. The exchange took place on the island of Cyprus on the property of Larnaca International Airport, under the supervision of the Red Cross.

== Release and later life ==
Amina returned to Israel after being exchanged, where she underwent intensive medical care and underwent plastic surgery to fix her broken jaw. Her teeth were also replaced and she was given a wig to cover her hair which became thin after the arrest. Then she moved to live in the city of Kiryat Yam, north of Haifa, under heavy guard. She was given the new name of "Dr. Ruth Nisanov" and a new birth date and identity. She then worked as a psychiatrist in the anesthesiology department at Sheba Medical Center. The department was then headed by Dr. Yona Elian, who was best known for heading the successful Mossad operation to capture Adolf Eichmann. After Dr. Yona Elian left office, Amina was fired and went to work in a hotel by the Dead Sea, and moved to a house in Hadera. In 1994, after Israel signed the peace agreement with Jordan and opened the border between the two countries, Amina traveled to visit her family in Amman. Her family renewed the relationship with her and she made frequent visits. She later returned to Amman, and at the end of 2008, she died at the age of 69 and was buried in Jordan.

Amina topped the honor board at the entrance to the Mossad headquarters. The honor board is a panel that includes the names of the most skilled members who were most loyal to Israel.

== Legacy ==
An Arabic TV series called An Eastern Girl (Arabic: فتاة من الشرق) was made about her, in which the Syrian actress Suzan Najm Aldeen played Amina. A book was also written about her.
