= Anwar Shaikh (writer) =

British Pakistani writer (1928–2006)

Anirudh Gyan Shikha (1 June 1928 – 25 November 2006; known as Anwar Shaikh) was a British India-born British writer, who spent much of his adult life in Pakistan and the United Kingdom, dying in Cardiff, Wales.

== Biography ==
Born Hajji Muhammad Shaikh, he was born into a family descended from Kashmiri Pandit converts to Islam in the city of Gujrat located in the north of Punjab (Pakistan). He was born on the day of the Haj, or pilgrimage, in 1928, which prompted his parents to attach 'Hajji' to his first name, but he was also born with aposthia (in which boys are born without foreskin), which was seen as an even greater omen for a bright future; thus his name then became Muhammad Anwar Shaikh, with Anwar meaning radiant in the Arabic language. In his youth, he was a devout Sunni along with his family.

During the violent days of the Partition of India, he became involved with Muslim nationalist groups and participated in violent attacks against non-Muslims. On one occasion he was involved in the killing of a Sikh father and his son. On another occasion, he bludgeoned another Sikh man he encountered on a Darabi road with a long knife. Memories of these crimes were said to have haunted him ever since. As he reached the age of 25, Shikha left Islam and expressed his perspectives through theological writings. He emigrated to the United Kingdom, married a Welsh woman, and became a successful businessman dealing in property development. At around this time, Shikha also converted to the Hindu religion practised by his ancestors. He subsequently adopted the name Anirudh Gyan Shikha. The importance of Shikha's work was recognized by Tariq Ali, who devoted a chapter of his book The Clash of Fundamentalisms to his views and the reaction they provoked.

Shikha was living in Cardiff, Wales, when a fatwa was issued against him from his homeland Pakistan in 1995, where at least fourteen fundamentalist clerics issued death sentences against him for apostasy. He died in Cardiff on 25 November 2006. Ali wrote that Shikha had gained notoriety among British Muslims. Many Muslims around the world, especially those of the subcontinent origin, have urged prominent Muslim scholars to write a rebuttal of Shikha's ideas.

== Works ==
- Islam: The Arab Imperialism, Cardiff, Principality (1998)
- The Vedic Civilization
- Islam: The Arab National Movement
- Islam: Sex and Violence
- Islam and Human Rights
- This is Jehad!
- Eternity
- Faith and Deception
- Taxation and Liberty
- Islam and Terrorism
- Sexual Conflict

== See also ==
- Apostasy in Islam
- Criticism of Islam
- List of former Muslims
- Religious conversion
