= Ifa Sudewi =

Indonesian chief judge

Ifa Sudewi is Chief Judge of Jambi High Court, Indonesia since 2025.

She is best known as the first female judge to be appointed to the 2002 Bali bombings trials. Educated in Solo, Java, she became a judge in 1990.
