= Massin Kevin Labidi =

Dutch-Tunisian political activist and blogger

- ماسين كيفن العبيدي
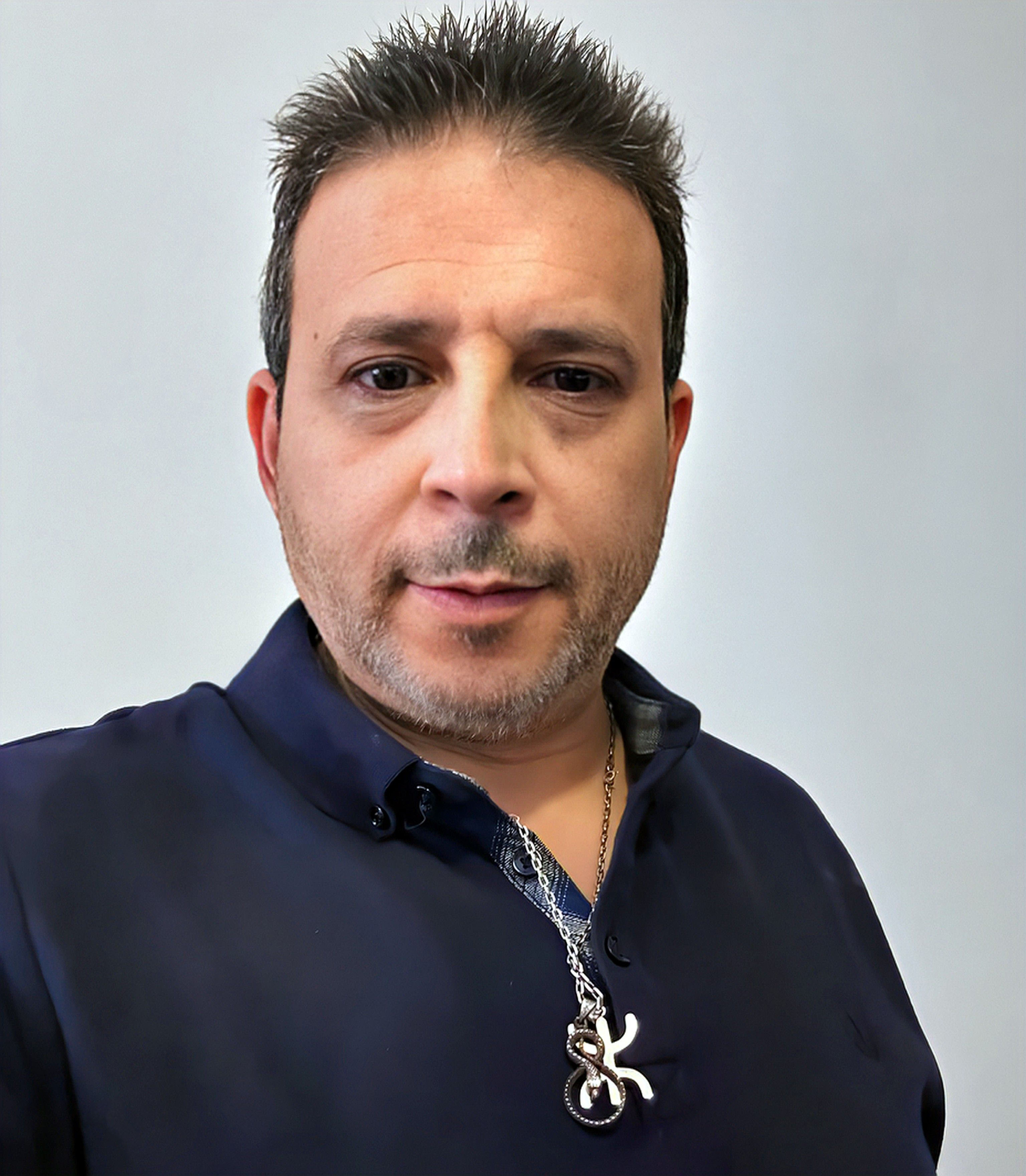
- Born: Mohamed Karim Labidi; 4 August 1966 (age 60); Tunisia
- Occupations: Atheist, political activist and blogger
- Known for: Criticism of Islam

Massin Kevin Labidi, birth name was Mohamed Karim Labidi (Arabic: ماسين كيفن العبيدي, Tifinagh: ⵎⴰⵙⵉⵏ ⴽⵉⴼⵉⵏ ⴰⵍⵄⴱⵉⴷⵉ, massin kɛvɪn labidi, IPA, born 4 August 1966; popularly known as Karim Labidi) is a Dutch-Tunisian ex-Muslim and ex-Islamist of Amazigh descent. An atheist, political activist and blogger known for his criticism of Islam.

== Biography ==
=== Early life ===
Massin Kevin Labidi was born into a traditional Sunni family, Tunisia, the Republic of Tunisia, on 4 August 1966. He is the seventh of nine children, grew up and studied briefly in Tunisia, and set off from his hometown to France in 1980 to pursue his education. Labidi family was non-conservative at first, the family knew political Islam through one of the elder sisters, the spouse of the former leader of Ennahda Movement, Salah Karker. Labidi was biased towards his elder sister, travelling between Iran and Syria for Islamic seminaries.

=== Political Islam ===
Labidi is an ex-Shia Imam, studied Islam in Tehran at Hawza Al-Qaim in 1983 that was headed by Mohammad al-Shirazi, Labidi received his Islamic education from senior Shia sheikhs, including Fawzi Muhammad Al Saif, Hassan al-Saffar, Hadi al-Modarresi and Mohammad Taqi al-Modarresi. He joined the Iranian Shia Islam political network, Rissali, (he had been recruited by Iranian Cultural Center in Paris) to be responsible of engaging new Islamist elements and worked as a coordinator with Ennahda Movement, his brother in law Salah Karker in particular, in Tunisia since 1985 until 1987. Labidi was arrested in Tunisia with a group of Islamist youths in 1987 on several charges claimed the impact of state security and dealing with foreign parties, and after the 1987 Tunisian coup d'état, Zine El Abidine Ben Ali, Labidi was released under a general legislative amnesty at the beginning of 1988.

== Work ==
Labidi abandoned the Iranian Shia Islam network, and became acquainted with Gnosticism and Sufism, through his visits to various countries in pursuit of knowledge. He settled in Morocco (1992–1997) moving between Tangier, Fez, Meknes and finally Agadir and was influenced by Sufi sheikhs, spiritual teachings. Labidi got arrested again in Morocco in 1998, discharged to Mauritania and then to Tunisia.

=== Islam criticism ===
Labidi has apostatized from Islam in 1998 and declared his atheism. Labidi found his atheistic faith, he summarizes his belief in one single line "No one is the Master of people, everyone is the Master of himself", he was invited to several events and political-intellectual conferences around the world; the Islam against Islam conference organized by AIME association, on 30 October 2004, the first of its kind in France, where Labidi spoke against political Islam describing the definition of Taqiya.The first association for ex-Muslims, Inter-Mediterranean Association, founded by Labidi in Tunisia 2001, was part of the leading association, "From Here, There, But Together"; first ex-Muslims association in France 2000, releasing its first hardcover magazine, T'AIME@TIC. The association and all its activities were banned in 2006 and Labidi was placed under unofficial house arrest until 2011, at the time of the Tunisian revolution.

=== Political events ===
Labidi sought political asylum in Netherlands 2012 and legally changed his first name to Massin Kevin after becoming a Dutch citizen. Labidi returned to his political-intellectual activities, in which he founded the intellectual, cultural movement "MCAN"; Movement of Changing North Africa, in 2015, the main pillar of MCAN is freedom of the Amazigh people on their land. Labidi applied to form a political party "Tinastparty" in Tunisia 2018 which was rejected by Tunisian authorities after multiple attempts. With respect to the association, the first MCAN conference took place in Rotterdam 15 July 2017, Labidi, official spokesperson, gave political speech about Amazigh culture to spread public awareness, right of speech and well-being for each individual. This movement participated in several political-intellectual events, Hirak Rif Movement occurred in Rotterdam 12 May 2018, whereas Labidi demanded the respect, preserve for the Amazigh; Morocco countryside. 2 June 2018, another protest "Mouchbessif" was arranged in Paris and Tunisia and MCAN participated in it to permit people of Tunisia to break their fast during the day in Ramadan. In Tunisia 13 August 2018, MCAN participated in "Harir Tunis" demonstration that was organized by "Tunisian Association of Democratic Women" for giving women equal inheritance rights. The Association "Amazighs Sanhaja du Rif" arranged, from 11 to 13 January 2019 in Tétouan, the 7th edition of the Bachikh Festival celebrating the Amazigh New Year 2969, under the theme: "A unique identity, a diverse culture and diverse languages". Labidi spoke on behalf of MCAN association about the Amazigh of Tunisia, affirming the right to land.

=== His books ===
Labidi tells his life experience with political Islam in his book, published by Zaynab Publishing House, French edition "Ma vie, ma Tunisie" that was translated later to Arabic in 2018 "رحلة وطن مع الإسلام السياسي" which means "My life, my Tunisia"

=== Activities ===
Labidi has been receiving death threats from Islamists since he started again, criticizing Islam through social media and political events. Labidi is active on Facebook, Twitter, Instagram and he has more than three YouTube channels that cover several topics; Criticism of Islam, politics, and spirituality. Labidi owns three personal and official websites, reflect his political and intellectual views.
