= List of members of the Norwegian Nobel Committee =

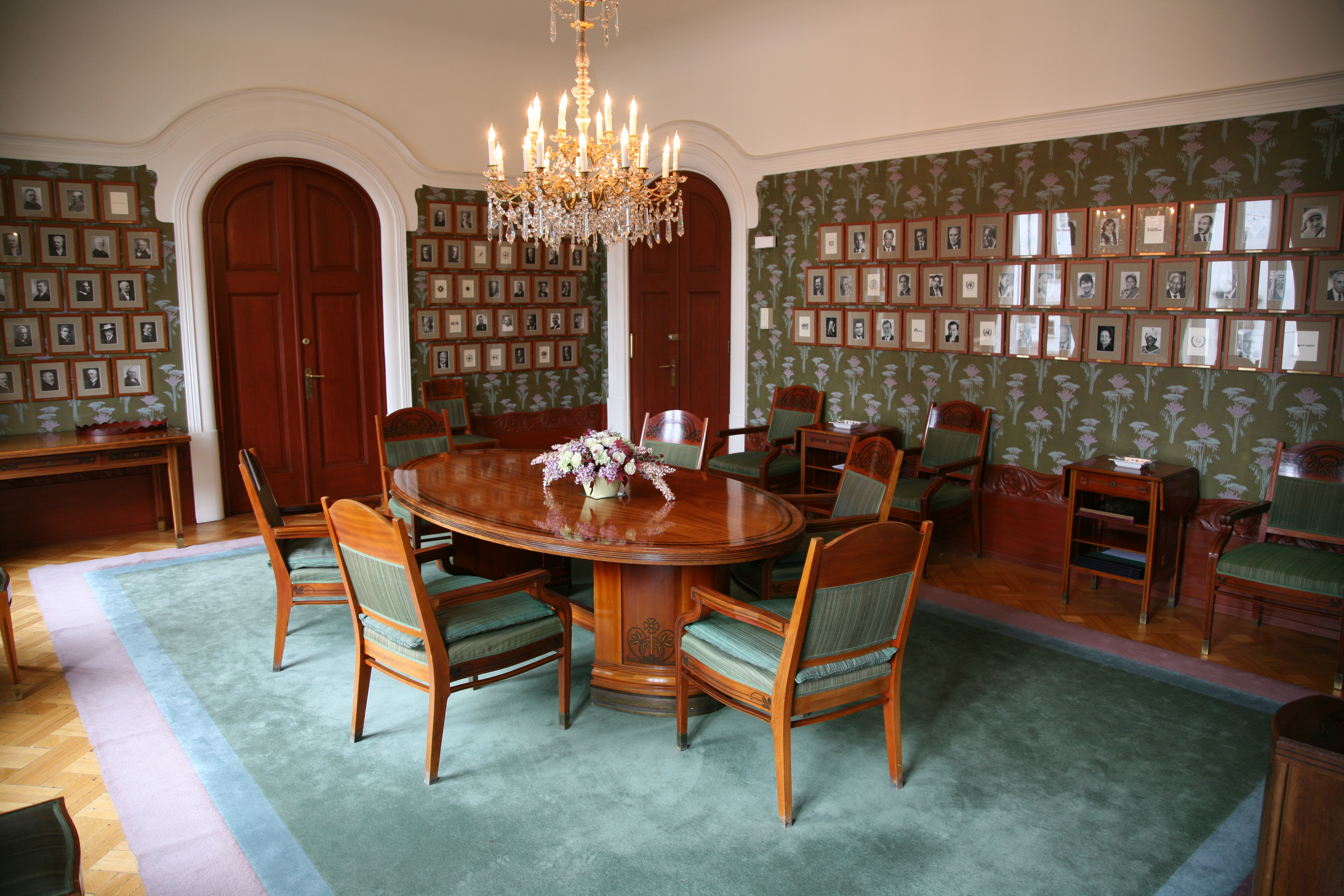
The committee meeting room at the Norwegian Nobel Institute

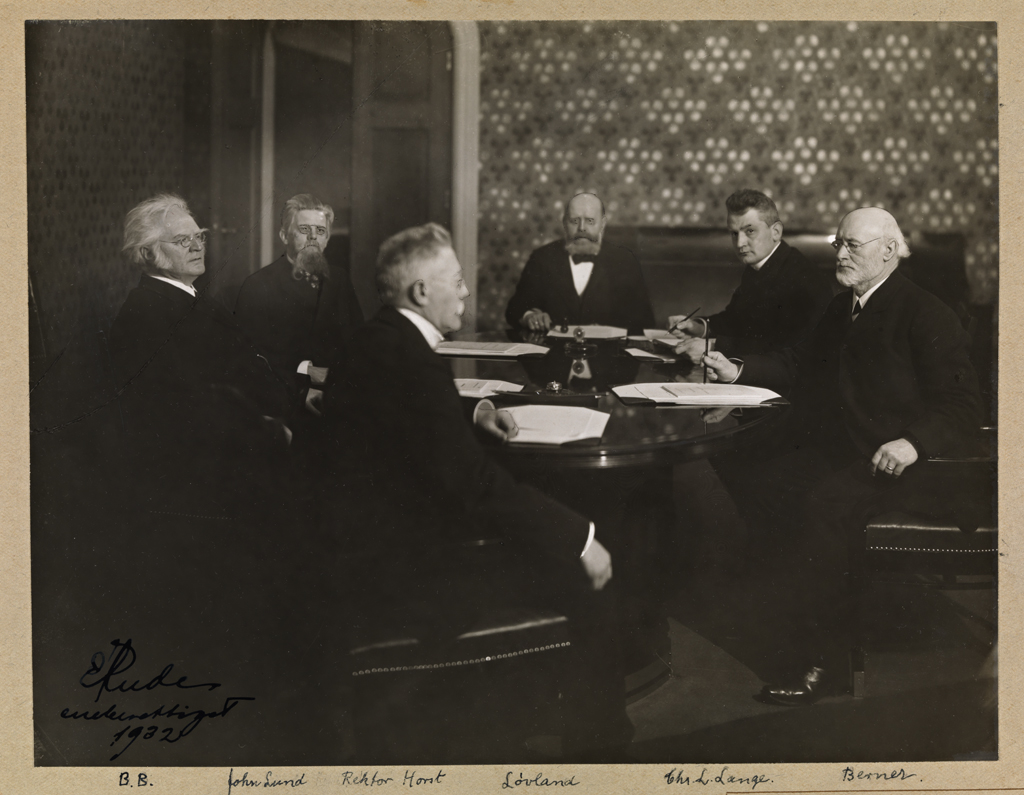
The first meeting of the committee in 1897. From the left Bjørnstjerne Bjørnson, John Lund, Hans Jacob Horst, Jørgen Løvland, Christian Lange and Carl Berner.

The five members of the Norwegian Nobel Committee award the Nobel Peace Prize every year. They are appointed by the Parliament of Norway and roughly represent the political makeup of that body. The committee was established in 1897, and has awarded the prize most years since 1901. Fifty-four people have sat on the committee, of which ten have been women. Thirteen have been chair and six deputy chair. The awards in 1935 (to Carl von Ossietzky), 1973 (to Henry Kissinger) and 1994 (to Yasser Arafat) caused members of the committee to withdraw due to disagreement with the committee decision.

Since 2018, the members are Berit Reiss-Andersen (chair, of the Labour Party), Henrik Syse (deputy chair, of the Conservative Party), Thorbjørn Jagland (Labour Party), Anne Enger (Centre Party) and Asle Toje (Progress Party). Historically, the committee's members have represented seven political parties, including (in addition to the four parties currently represented) the Liberal Party, the Socialist Left Party and the Christian People's Party. Six people have sat as the committee's secretary, who is also director of the Norwegian Nobel Institute. Since 2025, this has been Kristian Berg Harpviken.

== Appointment ==
The five-member Norwegian Nobel Committee was established on 5 August 1897, after the Parliament of Norway accepted the duty to award the Nobel Peace Prize as stated in the will of Alfred Nobel. The first prize was awarded in 1901. The Committee is assisted by a secretariat that is part of the Norwegian Nobel Institute. In 1901, the committee was renamed the Nobel Committee of the Parliament of Norway, but this was reverted in 1977. In 1948, the election system was changed to make the committee more proportional to the representation in parliament. From then until 1967, the Labour Party, who held a majority in parliament, had three representatives in the committee.

It is no longer possible for active parliamentarians to sit on the committee, except for the last half year of parliamentary representation, if they have stated that they will not run for re-election. This allowed Jagland and Valle to sit on the committee in 2009, while they were still elected. The appointment is made by parliament after nominations by the parties who are to be represented in the committee.

Since 2009, the Labour Party had two seats, while the three next-largest parties, the Progress Party, the Conservative Party and the Centre Party, each have one representative. The remaining parties in parliament are not represented.

== Current members ==
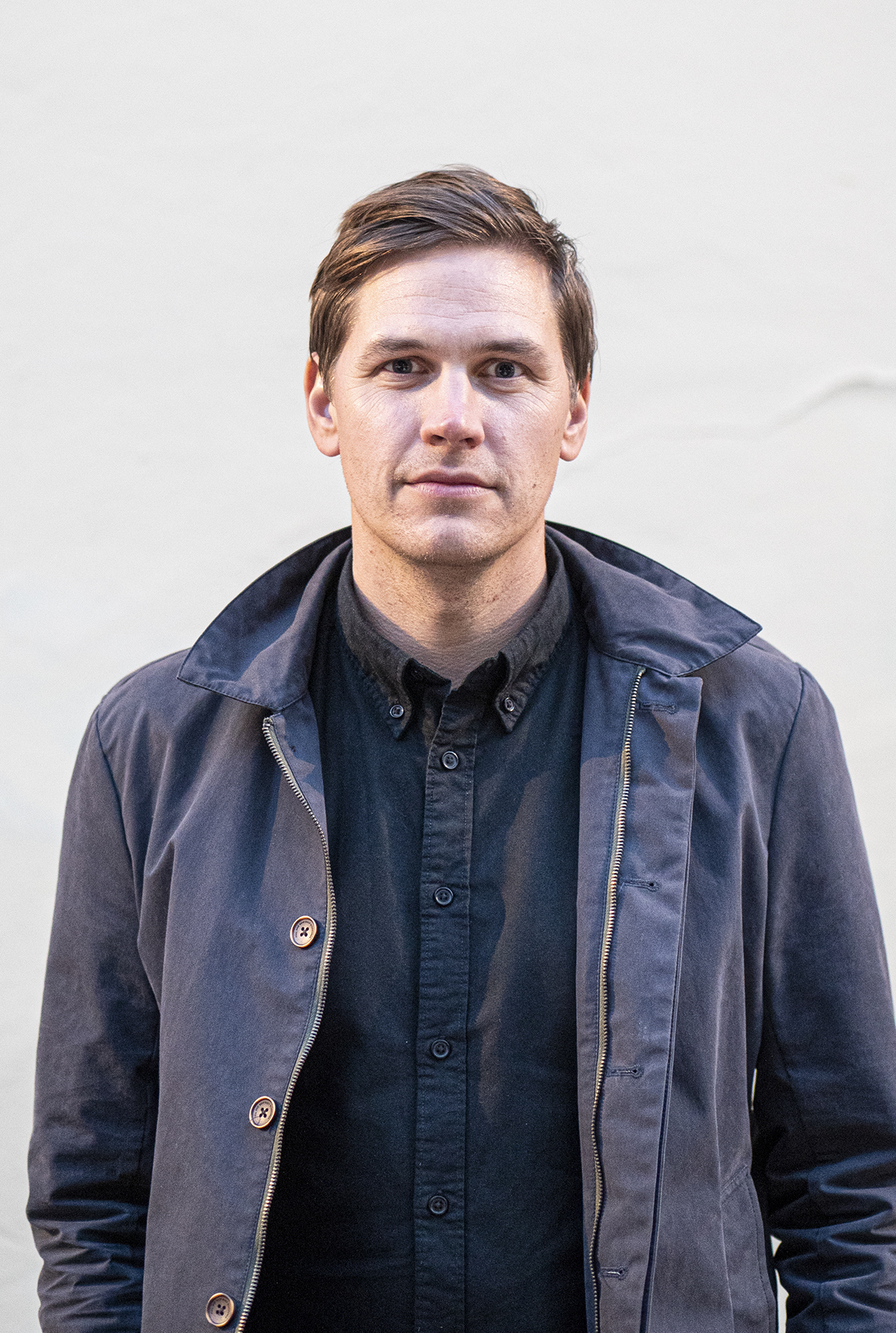
Jørgen Watne Frydnes, current chair of the Committee since 2024.

1. Anne Enger (born 9 December 1949) has sat on the committee since 2018. She is a Centre Party politician, independent adviser, former Party leader (1991–1999), former Minister of Culture and Deputy Prime Minister (1997–1999) and former County Governor of Østfold (2004–2015).
2. Asle Toje (born 16 February 1974) has sat on the committee since 2018. He is a foreign policy scholar and commentator, former Research Director at the Norwegian Nobel Institute.
3. Gry Larsen (born 7 November 1975) has sat on the committee since 2024.
4. Kristin Clemet (born 1957) has sat on the committee since 2021.
5. Jørgen Watne Frydnes (born 1984) has sat on the committee since 2021, and was appointed chair in 2024.

== All members ==
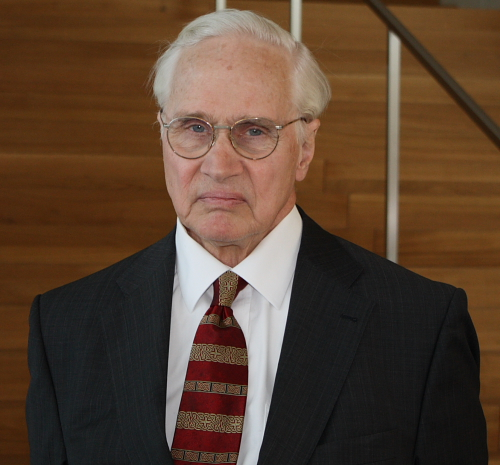
Francis Sejersted was chair from 1991 to 1999.

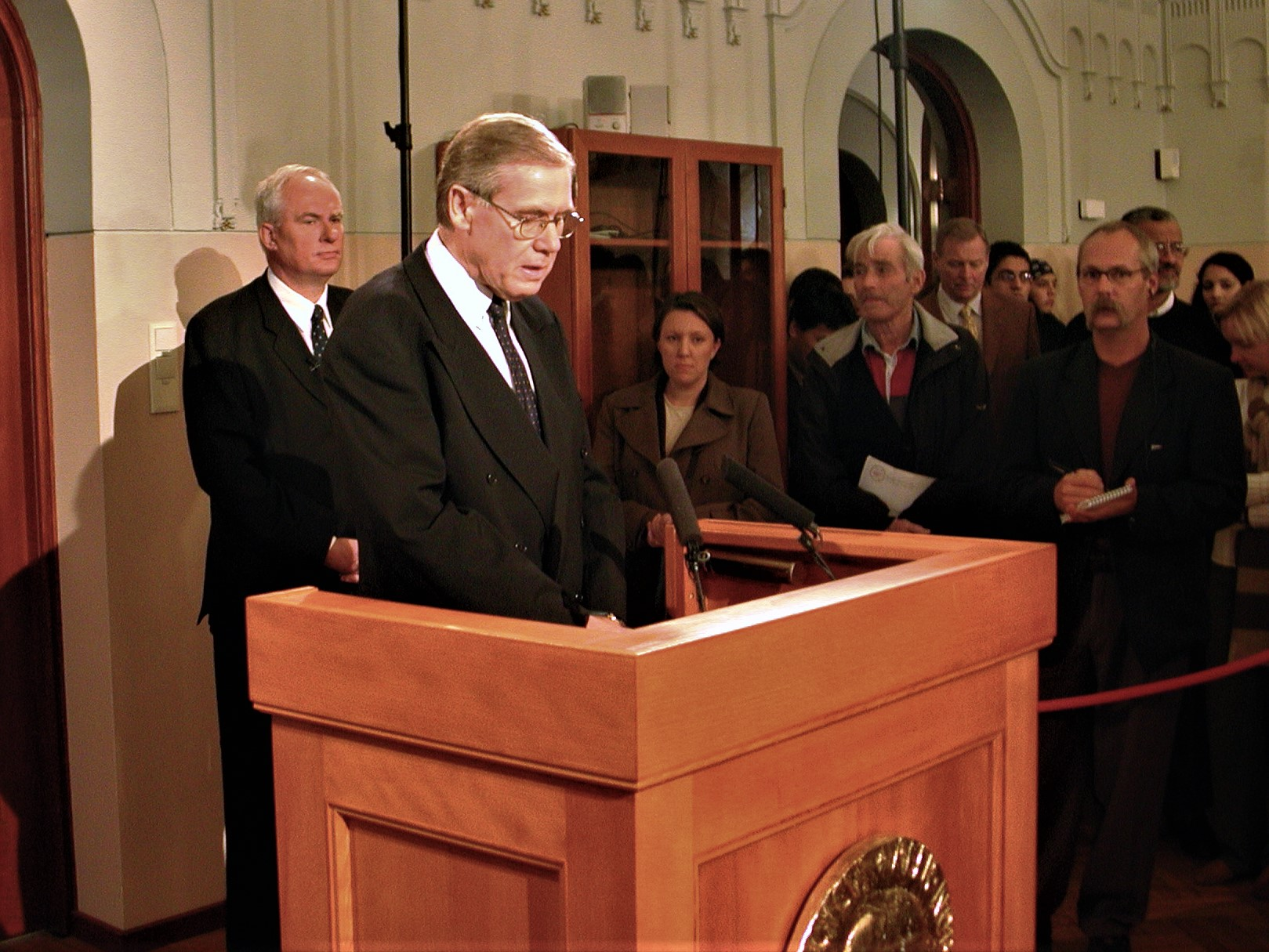
Gunnar Berge was chair from 2000 to 2002.

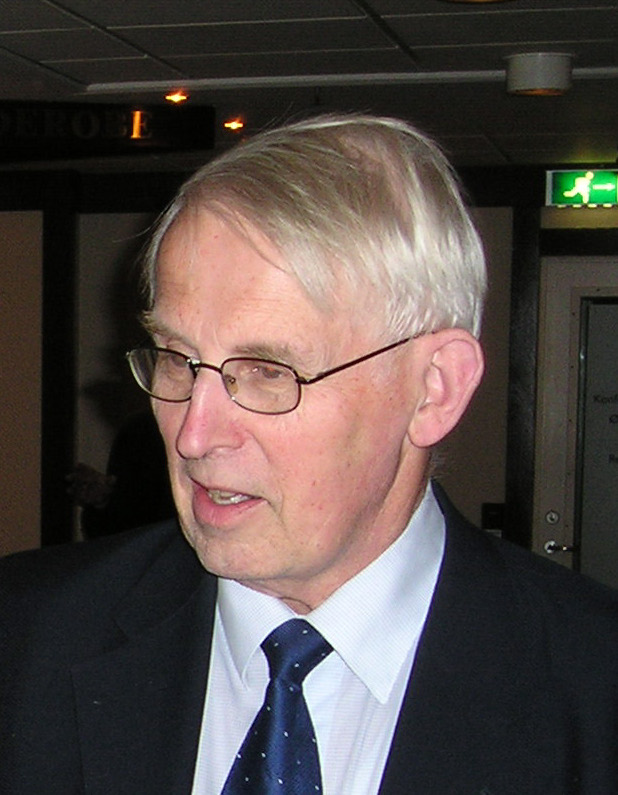
Ole Danbolt Mjøs was chair from 2003 to 2008.

Thorbjørn Jagland, chair of the Committee in 2009–2015, awarding the 2009 Prize to Barack Obama

The committee has had 59 different members. Fifteen people have been chair and nine deputy chair. Twelve women have sat on the committee, starting with Aase Lionæs in 1949. From 2009 to 2011, four of the board's five members were women. Christian Lous Lange is the only person to have both sat on the committee and been its secretary, and the only peace laureate to have sat on the committee. Bjørnstjerne Bjørnson was, however, awarded the Nobel Prize in Literature. The longest-serving members are Hans Jacob Horst and Aase Lionæs, who both served for 30 years. The longest-sitting chair is Gunnar Jahn, who sat for 26 years as chair and 29 years on the committee. The longest period without any changes to the committee was the 15 years from 1949 to 1963. The shortest-sitting member was Esther Kostøl, who sat for less than a year in 1997.

Seven political parties have been represented in the committee. The first committee consisted exclusively of members of the Liberal Party. The party was represented on all committees until 1973, after which it has not had a seat. In 1907, Francis Hagerup became the first representative from the Conservative Party, and this party has been represented on the board since. The Labour Party has been represented on the board since 1919, when Halvdan Koht became a member. The Agrarian Party (since named the Centre Party) was first represented on the board by Birger Braadland in 1938. The Christian Democratic Party was first represented by Erling Wikborg in 1965, the Socialist Left Party by Hanna Kvanmo in 1991 and the Progress Party by Inger-Marie Ytterhorn in 2000.

Three awards have resulted in members withdrawing from the committee. Following the 1935 award to the German pacifist Carl von Ossietzky, Johan Ludwig Mowinckel and Halvdan Koht withdrew. Koht was later re-appointed to the committee. Following the 1973 award to Lê Đức Thọ and Henry Kissinger, Einar Hovdhaugen and Helge Rognlien withdrew. Following the 1994 award to Yasser Arafat, Shimon Peres and Yitzhak Rabin, Kåre Kristiansen withdrew.

Thorbjørn Jagland sat on the committee from 2009 to 2020 and was its chair in 2009–2015. In March 2015, Jagland was demoted as a chairman, the first such move since the establishment of the Committee, but remained member. There was no official reason given for demotion, but a lot of criticism was aimed at him for awarding the Prize to Barack Obama, to the EU, and to Liu Xiaobo.

Member	Start	End	Tenure (years)	Party	Chair	Deputy chair
Jørgen Løvland	1901	1921	21	Liberal	1901–21	—
John Lund	1901	1912	12	Liberal	—	1901–13
Bjørnstjerne Bjørnson	1901	1906	6	Liberal	—	—
Johannes Steen	1901	1904	4	Liberal	—	—
Hans Jacob Horst	1901	1930	30	Liberal	—	1914–22
Carl Berner	1905	1918	14	Liberal	—	—
Francis Hagerup	1907	1920	14	Conservative	—	—
Cornelius Bernhard Hanssen	1913	1939	27	Liberal	—	1922–39
Halvdan Koht	1919	1938	22 (Note: Halvdan Koht did not serve from 1937 through 1940.)	Labour	—	—
Fredrik Stang	1921	1940	20	Conservative	1922–40	—
Wollert Konow	1922	1924	3	Liberal	—	—
Christian Holtermann Knudsen	1924	1924	1	Labour	—	—
Johan Ludwig Mowinckel	1925	1936	12	Liberal	—	—
Axel Thallaug	1931	1933	3	Conservative	—	—
Christian Lous Lange	1934	1938	6	Labour	—	—
Gunnar Jahn	1938	1966	29	Liberal	1941–66	—
Birger Braadland	1938	1948	10 (Note: Birger Braadland did not serve in 1941.)	Agrarian	—	—
Anders Vassbotn	1939	1939	2	Liberal	—	—
Carl Joachim Hambro	1940	1963	22 (Note: Carl Joachim Hambro was on leave of absence in 1946.)	Conservative	—	1945–49
Martin Tranmæl	1940	1963	24	Labour	—	—
Halvard Manthey Lange	1945	1948	3 (Note: Halvard Manthey Lange was on leave of absence in 1946.)	Labour	—	—
Christian Oftedal	1946	1947	2	Liberal	—	—
Herman Smitt Ingebretsen	1946	1946	1	Conservative	—	—
Aase Lionæs	1949	1978	30	Labour	1968–78	—
Gustav Natvig-Pedersen	1949	1965	3	Labour	—	1949–65
Nils Langhelle	1964	1967	3	Labour	1967	1965–66
John Lyng	1964	1965	2	Conservative	—	—
Erling Wikborg	1965	1969	5	Christian Democratic	—	—
Bernt Ingvaldsen	1967	1975	9	Conservative	1967	1967, 1968–75
Helge Refsum	1965	1972	6	Centre	—	—
Helge Rognlien	1967	1973	7	Liberal	—	—
John Sanness	1970	1981	12	Labour	1979–81	—
Einar Hovdhaugen	1973	1973	1	Centre	—	—
Egil Aarvik	1974	1989	16	Christian Democratic	1982–89	1976–81
Trygve Haugeland	1974	1984	11	Centre	—	—
Sjur Lindebrække	1976	1981	6	Conservative	—	—
Else Germeten	1979	1984	6	Labour	—	—
Gidske Anderson	1982	1993	12	Labour	1990	1981–90; 1991–93
Francis Sejersted	1982	1999	18	Conservative	1991–99	1990
Odvar Nordli	1985	1996	12	Labour	—	—
Gunnar Stålsett	1985	2002	19 (Note: Gunnar Stålsett did not serve in 1994.)	Centre	—	2000–02
Gunnar Stålsett	2012	2014	19	Centre	—	2000–02
Kaare Sandegren	1990	1996	3 (Note: Kaare Sandegren only served in 1990, during the last quarter of 1993 and the last quarter of 1996.)	Labour	—	—
Kåre Kristiansen	1991	1994	4	Christian Democratic	—	—
Hanna Kvanmo	1991	2002	12	Socialist Left	—	1993–98
Sissel Rønbeck	1994	2011	18 (Note: Rønbeck was on leave from October 1996 to November 1997.)	Labour	—	—
Gunnar Berge	1997	2002	6	Labour	2000–02	1999
Esther Kostøl	1997	1997	1	Labour	—	—
Inger-Marie Ytterhorn	2000	2017	18	Progress	—	—
Ole Danbolt Mjøs	2003	2008	6	Christian Democratic	2003–08	—
Berge Furre	2003	2008	6	Socialist Left	—	2003–08
Kaci Kullmann Five	2003	2017	15	Conservative	2015–17	2009–15
Thorbjørn Jagland	2009	2020	12	Labour	2009–15	—
Ågot Valle	2009	2011	3	Socialist Left	—	—
Berit Reiss-Andersen	2012	2023	12	Labour	2017–23	2015–17
Henrik Syse	2015	2020	6	Conservative	—	2018–20
**Anne Enger**	2018	2026	9	Centre	—	—
**Asle Toje**	2018	2029	12	Progress	—	—
**Kristin Clemet**	2021	2026	6	Conservative	—	—
**Jørgen Watne Frydnes**	2021	2026	6	Labour	2024—	—
**Gry Larsen**	2024	2029	6	Labour	—	—

Key
Current members in **bold**

== Secretaries ==
The committee's secretary is the sitting director of the Norwegian Nobel Institute. Since 2025, the secretary has been Kristian Berg Harpviken (born 1961), sociologist, researcher, and former director of the Peace Research Institute Oslo.

Secretary	Start	End	Tenure (years)
Christian Lous Lange	1901	1909	9
Ragnvald Moe	1910	1945	36
August Schou	1946	1973	18
Tim Greve	1974	1977	4
Jakob Sverdrup	1978	1989	12
Geir Lundestad	1990	2014	25
Olav Njølstad	2015	2025	10
Kristian Berg Harpviken	2025	present	0

== Notes and references ==
=== Bibliography ===
- Heffermehl, Fredrik (2008). Nobels vilje (in Norwegian). Oslo: Vidarforlaget. ISBN 978-82-7990-074-0.
