= 2012 Nobel Peace Prize =

Award

The 2012 Nobel Peace Prize
- European Union
- "for over six decades contributed to the advancement of peace and reconciliation, democracy and human rights in Europe."
- Date: 12 October 2012 (announcement by Thorbjørn Jagland); 10 December 2012 (ceremony)
- Location: Oslo, Norway
- Presented by: Norwegian Nobel Committee
- Rewards: 8 million SEK ($1.2M, €0.9M)
- First award: 1901
- Website: www.nobelprize.org/prizes/peace/2012/

The member states of the European Union (European Communities pre-1993), animated in order of accession. Only territories in and around Europe are shown.

The 2012 Nobel Peace Prize was awarded to the European Union (EU) (founded in 1958) "for over six decades [having] contributed to the advancement of peace and reconciliation, democracy and human rights in Europe" by a unanimous decision of the Norwegian Nobel Committee.

The decision highlighted the reconciliation of France and Germany, stating that "over a seventy-year period, Germany and France had fought three wars. Today war between Germany and France is unthinkable. This shows how, through well-aimed efforts and by building up mutual confidence, historical enemies can become close partners." The decision also highlighted the EU's contribution to the "introduction of democracy" in Greece, Spain and Portugal, the advancing of democracy and human rights in Turkey, the strengthening of democracy in Eastern Europe following the Revolutions of 1989 and overcoming of "the division between East and West" and ethnically based national conflicts, and finally the EU's contribution to the "process of reconciliation in the Balkans".

== Nominations ==
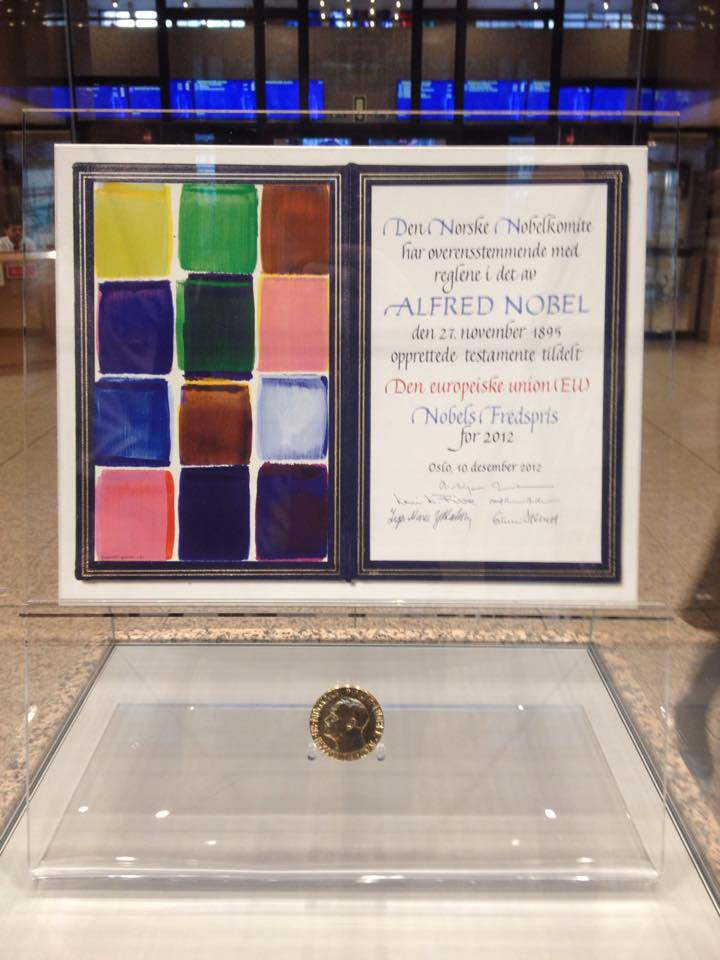
The medal and the certificate exposed at the Council of the European Union

For the 2012 award the Nobel Committee received 231 valid nominations, compared to the record 247 candidates in 2011. 43 of the nominations were organisations, while the remaining 188 were individuals, either alone, together with others or together with organisations.

== Norwegian Nobel Committee members ==
Members of the Norwegian Nobel Committee were appointed by the Norwegian Parliament to roughly reflect the party makeup of that body. The committee had the following membership in 2012: Thorbjørn Jagland (chair), Kaci Kullmann Five (deputy chair), Inger-Marie Ytterhorn, Berit Reiss-Andersen, and Gunnar Stålsett (member during Ågot Valle's sick leave).

== Announcement ==
The award was announced on 12 October 2012. The Nobel citation referred to the strict demands the European Union placed on all would-be members, gave special mention to Greece, Spain, and Portugal—all of which joined in the 1980s after dictatorships ended—and referred to the countries in Eastern Europe that embraced it after the fall of the Berlin Wall and the collapse of the Soviet Union.

== Official reactions ==
=== European Union ===
The President of the European Council, Herman Van Rompuy, said that the award recognised the European Union as the "biggest peacemaker in history".

The President of the European Parliament, German social democrat Martin Schulz, said he was "deeply touched. The European Union has reunified the continent through peaceful means and brought arch enemies together. This historic act of reunification has been rightfully recognised." He said that "from the Balkans to the Caucasus, the EU serves as a beacon for democracy and reconciliation."

The President of the European Commission, José Manuel Barroso, called the award "a very important message to Europe that the European Union is something very precious, that we should cherish it for the good of Europeans and for the good of the entire world."

The High Representative of the Union for Foreign Affairs and Security Policy, Catherine Ashton, said she was "delighted" at the news, adding that "in the countries of the EU, historic enemies have become close partners and friends. I am proud to be part of continuing this work."

=== European Union members and candidates ===
Founding members

Belgium – The Prime Minister of Belgium, Elio Di Rupo, said that "this choice shows that the European project continues to inspire the world today. The European Union was originally the dream of people and politicians in search of peace and prosperity for all citizens. It has become a strong symbol of cooperation and progress. Europe, a continent that was torn by terrible wars, thanks to the European Union is an example for the world of peaceful dialogue and conflict prevention."

France – The President of France, François Hollande, said the prize was an "immense honour", adding that "through this award, every European can feel pride, that of being a member of a union which has been able to make peace between peoples who for a long time clashed, and to build a community founded on values of democracy, liberty and solidarity." Former President Valéry Giscard d'Estaing said that "it is right that this extraordinary effort that has been accomplished by the Europeans and their leaders to establish a lasting peace on their continent—historically ravaged by war—is rewarded and honored."

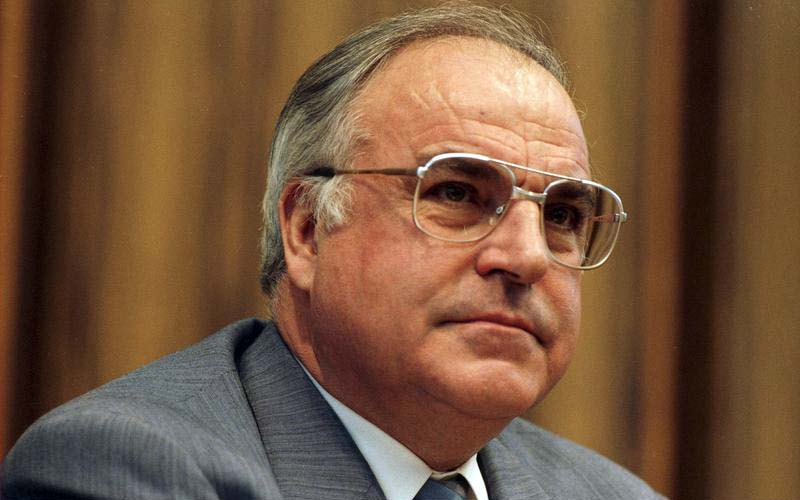
Helmut Kohl, who together with François Mitterrand is regarded as the main architect of the Maastricht Treaty that established the European Union in 1993, said the award was "a wise and far-sighted decision" that "is above all a confirmation for the European peace project."

Germany – The President of Germany, Joachim Gauck, called the award "a great encouragement in difficult times" and said the EU is "a unique project of peace and freedom". The Chancellor of Germany, Angela Merkel, called the award a wonderful decision that "honours the idea of European integration". The Minister for Foreign Affairs of Germany, Guido Westerwelle, called the award "a fantastic decision which makes me proud and happy. European integration is the most successful project for peace in history." Former Chancellor Helmut Kohl called the award "a wise and far-sighted decision" that "is above all a confirmation for the European peace project. As Europeans we all have reason to be proud today. I am proud, and I wish for God's blessing for us on our further path to a united Europe."

Italy – The Prime Minister of Italy, Mario Monti, hailed the decision and said that the European Union's "formula of (using) integration to stop war and guarantee peace and practised for decades is the subject of study and admiration in other parts of the world."

Luxembourg – The Prime Minister of Luxembourg, Jean-Claude Juncker, called the award a "good decision", stating that the EU from its inception was a peacemaker in Europe. He added that "it is sometimes useful to get such recognition from the outside [...] to remind us why we are considered a model for others."

Netherlands – The Prime Minister of the Netherlands, Mark Rutte, said the award was a "great recognition of the major historical role the European Union has played in peace, security and democracy."

New accession states (by order of accession)

Denmark (1973) – The Minister for Europe of Denmark, Nicolai Wammen, said the prize is "fully deserved, because the EU has been a peace project from the beginning. The European cooperation has been successful in creating lasting peace between countries that for centuries have been at war with each other."

Ireland (1973) – The Tánaiste and Minister for Foreign Affairs and Trade of Ireland, Eamon Gilmore, "warmly welcomed" the decision, stating that "the European Union has been the most successful peace process in our lifetime, and indeed in our living memory."

United Kingdom (1973) – The British government issued a statement, saying that "this award recognises the EU’s historic role in promoting peace and reconciliation in Europe, particularly through its enlargement to Central and Eastern Europe. The EU must always strive to preserve and strengthen those achievements for the future."

Greece (1981) - The Prime Minister of Greece, Antonis Samaras was representing Greece and in his announcement he stressed the need for advanced social cohesion for facing the problem of unemployment, in order to avoid right-extremists raise in the European Union.

Spain (1986) – The Prime Minister of Spain, Mariano Rajoy, said the award was "excellent news", adding that "the EU serves as a stimulus for the further consolidation of Europe's political, economic and monetary union."

Austria (1995) – The President of Austria, Heinz Fischer, said the award was "great and pioneering news for Europe", adding that "we have always considered the united Europe as a peace project, and the grand recognition of this idea by the Nobel Prize committee gives us confidence and courage to continue working on the European peace project."

Finland (1995) – The President of Finland, Sauli Niinistö, said the prize was a magnificent recognition that the EU has worked hard for peace and brought virtues of the European tradition to the outside world. The Prime Minister of Finland, Jyrki Katainen, said "there is every reason to be happy that we can take part in integration, building stability and strengthening the project of peace."

Sweden (1995) – The Minister of Foreign Affairs of Sweden, Carl Bildt, warmly congratulated "all of Europe" and said the prize was "highly deserved and highly important".

Czech Republic (2004) – The President of the Czech Republic, Václav Klaus, called the decision a "great mistake", adding that "it would make sense, if the award would have been given to an individual instead of an organisation. To award a bureaucratic institution is an 'empty' prize."

Hungary (2004) – The Prime Minister of Hungary, Viktor Orbán, said the EU deserved the Nobel Peace Prize, and that the EU represented the peaceful coexistence of previously hostile countries.

Poland (2004) – The Minister of Foreign Affairs of Poland, Radosław Sikorski, issued a statement, saying "congratulations to the EU, and therefore to all of us", adding that "the Nobel Peace Prize signifies that European integration is a guarantee of peace in the region."

Slovenia (2004) – The President of Slovenia, Danilo Türk, said that the prize was deserved because the EU is "the most successful peace project in the history of humanity." The Prime Minister of Slovenia, Janez Janša, stated that peace was one of the founding causes for the foundation of the European Union and that the award was a reminder that peace is a value.

Candidates and other aspiring members

Albania – The Foreign Minister of Albania, Edmond Panariti, said the award meant a "great responsibility that should encourage the will for enlargement."

Bosnia and Herzegovina – The chairman of the joint Presidency of Bosnia and Herzegovina, Bakir Izetbegović, said the award "should be a strong boost for EU countries to overcome existing problems and stick to the concept of further enlargement."

Croatia – The Foreign Minister of Croatia, Vesna Pusić, praised the EU for its role in keeping "a lasting peace in a region that had wars almost continuously for centuries."

Kosovo – The Foreign Minister of Kosovo, Enver Hoxhaj, said that "awarding the Nobel Peace Prize to the EU makes us proud and motivates us to continue the reforms in order that Kosovo become a member of the union."

Macedonia – The President of the Republic of Macedonia, Gjorge Ivanov, said the award honoured the project of "unifying peoples in their mutual efforts for freedom, solidarity and prosperity."

Montenegro – The Foreign Minister of Montenegro, Nebojša Kaluđerović, said the "idea to unite European countries with all their differences is the best proof the EU is worthy of this award."

Serbia – The Prime Minister of Serbia, Ivica Dačić, congratulated the EU, expressing hope that it would manage to preserve its unity.

Turkey – The Minister of European Union Affairs of Turkey, Egemen Bağış, said that "his country's membership perspective has contributed to this award."

=== Other ===
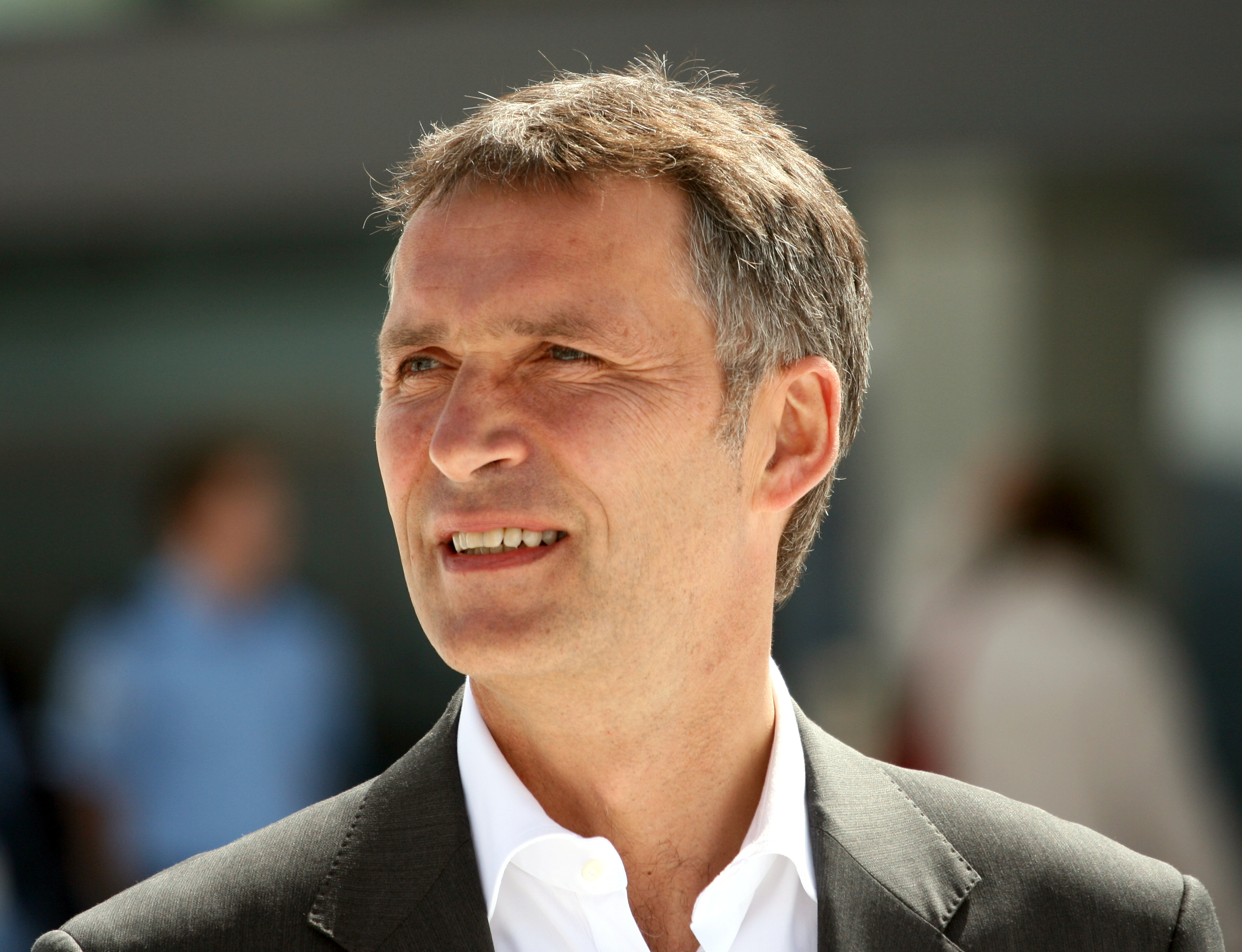
Prime Minister Jens Stoltenberg of Norway said the EU has secured peace and built democracy.

NATO – The Secretary General of NATO, Anders Fogh Rasmussen, offered the European Union his "warmest congratulations", stating that "the European Union has played a vital role in healing the wounds of history and promoting peace, reconciliation and cooperation across Europe. It has contributed to the advancement of freedom, democracy and human rights across the continent and beyond. From the outset, NATO and the European Union have shared common values and helped shape the new Europe."

Norway – The Prime Minister of Norway, Jens Stoltenberg, congratulated the European Union, stating that the EU "has helped to secure peace and build democracy in Europe over many years."

Switzerland – The President of Switzerland, Eveline Widmer-Schlumpf, congratulated the EU. A government statement said the prize recognised "the essential role" which the EU has played in the peaceful development of the continent.

United Nations – The Secretary-General of the United Nations, Ban Ki-moon, lauded the decision in a statement on behalf of the entire United Nations family, and emphasised the European Union's role in helping to build peace, promote human rights and support economic and social development across the world. He called the award "a richly-deserved recognition of its accomplishments and its importance in Europe and around the world."

United States – The U.S. Secretary of State, Hillary Clinton, congratulated the European Union, stating that "certainly it's quite remarkable to see how unified and peaceful Europe is in the 21st century and that did not happen by coincidence. It happened because of the very hard work and dedication of leaders and citizens across Europe."

== Public reactions ==
The prize was mostly positively received by European and American media, with the notable exception of sections of the British media. In editorials, Aftenposten, Der Spiegel, Frankfurter Allgemeine Zeitung, Le Soir, De Standaard, de Volkskrant, La Stampa, Le Figaro, Die Welt, Die Presse and the Financial Times all described the prize as deserved. The Wall Street Journal described the award as "an inspired decision" and "a reminder there is more to the EU than the euro and that its achievements over 60 years have been remarkable."

Steven Pinker applauded the decision as part of a lecture about The Better Angels of Our Nature, remarking that the assignment of the prize recognized the value of an international community as well as the fact that what had started as an economic union had really had a pacifying effect.

While European leaders greeted the decision, the award tended to be criticized by Eurosceptics including the far-right (such as National Front leader Marine Le Pen) and far-left. Nigel Farage, leader of the right-wing UKIP and co-chairman of the anti-EU EFD group within the European Parliament, claimed the decision brought the Nobel Peace Prize "into total disrepute" due to its "insulting" assumption that the EU has prevented conflicts.

In a poll conducted in Norway by ResponsAnalyse for the newspaper Aftenposten, 26% of respondents agreed with the decision to award the European Union the prize, while 37% opposed it and a further 37% had no opinion. The director of the Norwegian Nobel Institute, Geir Lundestad described the results of the poll as "... more positive than he had expected" on the background of the "... negative attitude to the EU" in Norway. Lundestad stated that the award was not about Norwegian membership in the EU, but a "wider perspective".

On 30 November 2012, Nobel Peace Prize winners Desmond Tutu, Mairead Maguire and Adolfo Pérez Esquivel publicly opposed the awarding of the prize to the European Union. The 1984, 1976 and 1980 laureates stated in an open letter to the Nobel Foundation, based in Sweden, that in their view the EU stood for "... security based on military force and waging wars rather than insisting on the need for an alternative approach" and that "... the Norwegian Nobel Committee has redefined and reshaped the prize in a way that is not in accordance with the law". The International Peace Bureau, which won the prize in 1910, and several peace activists, writers and lawyers also signed the letter. The signatories demanded that the Nobel Foundation stop the payment of the SEK 8 million prize money.

== Award ceremony ==
During the announcement, committee chairman Thorbjørn Jagland was asked whether Helmut Kohl or any of the current EU officials would be present to accept the prize on the EU's behalf. Jagland said the EU will have to decide who would accept the prize.

The EU decided that the prize would be accepted by President of the European Council Herman Van Rompuy, President of the European Commission José Manuel Barroso and President of the European Parliament Martin Schulz. Van Rompuy and Barroso held the acceptance speeches.

Most EU heads of states or governments except six attended the ceremony. French President François Hollande and Chancellor of Germany Angela Merkel attended. David Cameron and five other EU heads of state or government did not attend. Cameron sent his deputy Nick Clegg in his stead.

== See also ==
- 2004 enlargement of the European Union
- Eurosphere
- History of the European Union
- Pax Europaea
- Stabilisation and Association Process
- League of peace
- World peace
