= 2009 Nobel Peace Prize =

Award given to Barack Obama

- Barack Obama
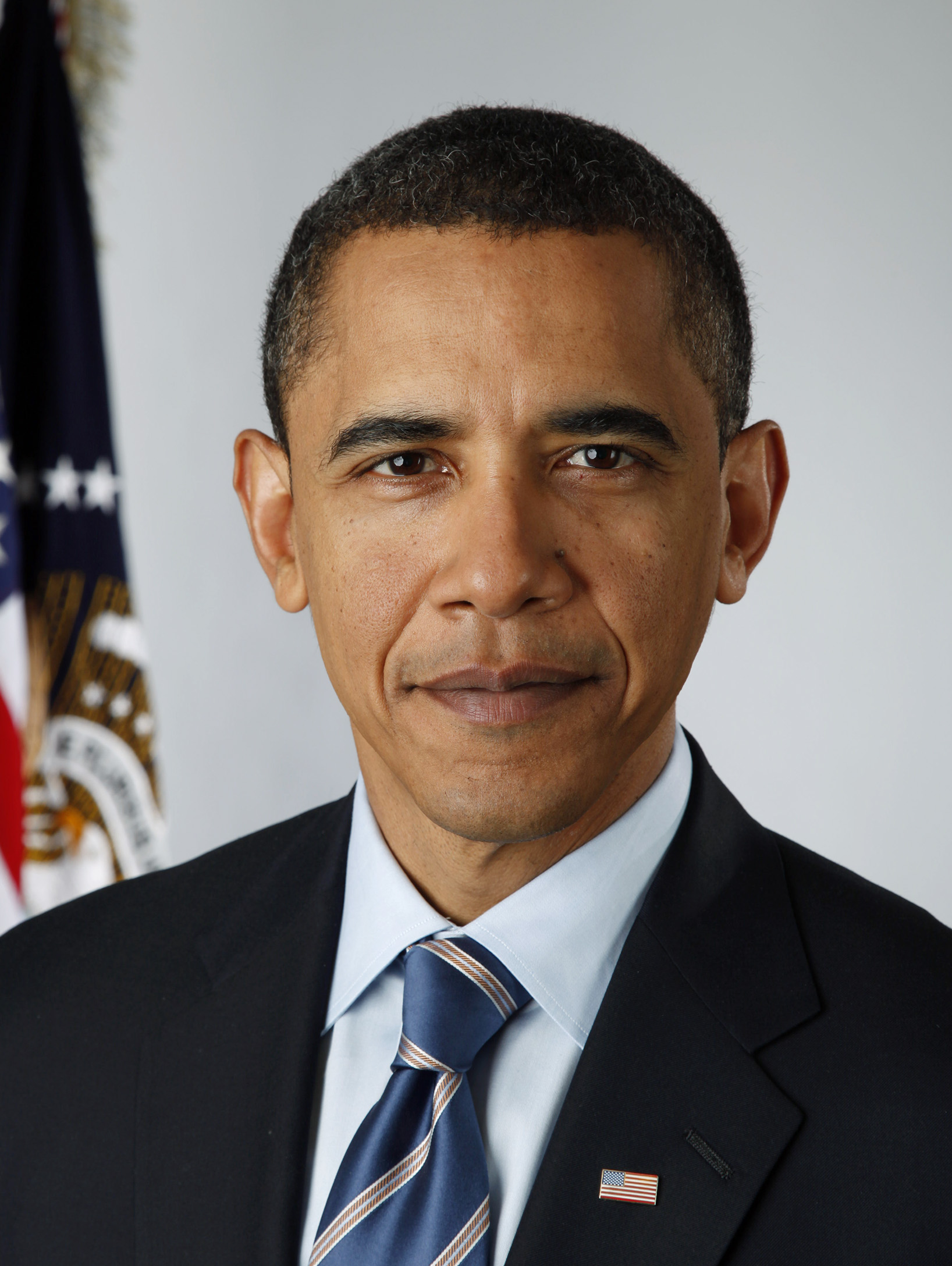
- "for his extraordinary efforts to strengthen international diplomacy and cooperation between peoples."
- Date: 9 October 2009 (announcement by Thorbjørn Jagland); 10 December 2009 (ceremony)
- Location: Oslo, Norway
- Presented by: Norwegian Nobel Committee
- Reward: 10 million SEK ($1.5M)
- Website: Official website

The 2009 Nobel Peace Prize was awarded to United States President Barack Obama (b. 1961) for his "extraordinary efforts to strengthen international diplomacy and cooperation between peoples". The Norwegian Nobel Committee announced the award on October 9, 2009, citing Obama's promotion of nuclear nonproliferation and a "new climate" in international relations fostered by Obama, especially in reaching out to the Muslim world.

The Nobel Committee's decision drew mixed reactions from US commentators and editorial writers across the political spectrum, as well as from the rest of the world.

Obama accepted the prize in Oslo on December 10, 2009. In a 36-minute speech, he discussed the tensions between war and peace and the idea of a "just war" saying, "perhaps the most profound issue surrounding my receipt of this prize is the fact that I am the commander-in-chief of the military of a nation in the midst of two wars."

Obama is the fourth president of the United States to have won the Nobel Peace Prize (after Theodore Roosevelt, Woodrow Wilson and Jimmy Carter, with Carter's honor happening after leaving office).

== Selection and announcement ==
The winner is selected by the Nobel Committee from nominations submitted by committee members and others. Nominations for the 2009 Nobel Peace Prize closed just 11 days after Obama took office. There were 205 nominations for the 2009 award, which included Chinese and Afghan civil rights activists and African politicians. Colombian senator Piedad Córdoba, Afghanistan's Sima Samar, Chinese dissident Hu Jia and Prime Minister of Zimbabwe Morgan Tsvangirai had been speculated to be favorites for the award.

The five members of the Nobel Committee are appointed by the Norwegian Parliament to roughly reflect the party makeup of that body. The 2009 Committee comprised two members of the Norwegian Labour Party, one from the left-wing Socialist Left Party, one from the Conservative Party of Norway and one from the right-wing Progress Party. The chairman of the committee was Thorbjørn Jagland, former Norwegian Labour Party prime minister and Secretary General of the Council of Europe since September 29, 2009. The panel met six or seven times in 2009, beginning several weeks after the February 1 nomination deadline. The winner was chosen unanimously on October 5, but was initially opposed by the Socialist Left, Conservative and Progress Party members until strongly persuaded by Jagland.

Jagland said "We have not given the prize for what may happen in the future. We are awarding Obama for what he has done in the past year. And we are hoping this may contribute a little bit for what he is trying to do," noting that he hoped the award would assist Obama's foreign policy efforts. Jagland said the committee was influenced by a speech Obama gave about Islam in Cairo in June 2009, the president's efforts to prevent nuclear proliferation and climate change, and Obama's support for using established international bodies such as the United Nations to pursue foreign policy goals.

The New York Times reported that Jagland shrugged off the question of whether "the committee feared being labeled naïve for accepting a young politician's promises at face value", stating that "no one could deny that 'the international climate' had suddenly improved, and that Mr. Obama was the main reason... We want to embrace the message that he stands for."

Barack Obama with Thorbjørn Jagland at the 2009 Nobel Peace Prize ceremony

Obama was the fourth U.S. president to be awarded the Nobel Peace Prize, after Theodore Roosevelt (1906) and Woodrow Wilson (1919)—both of whom received the award during their terms—and Jimmy Carter (2002), who received the award 21 years after leaving office. In addition, then-sitting vice president Charles Dawes was a co-winner with Austen Chamberlain (1925), and former vice president Al Gore was a co-winner with the U.N.'s Intergovernmental Panel on Climate Change (2007).

Obama was the first U.S. president to receive the award during his first year in office (at eight and a half months, after being nominated less than two weeks in office), although several other world leaders were awarded in the year following their election to national office, including Óscar Arias (1987).

== Reactions ==
=== Barack Obama ===
Obama said he was "surprised" and "deeply humbled" by the award. In remarks given at the White House Rose Garden on the day of the announcement, Obama stated, "I do not view it as a recognition of my own accomplishments but rather an affirmation of American leadership on behalf of aspirations held by people in all nations."

"Throughout history, the Nobel Peace Prize has not just been used to honor specific achievement; it's also been used as a means to give momentum to a set of causes," Obama said. "And that is why I will accept this award as a call to action—a call for all nations to confront the common challenges of the 21st century." He said those common challenges included the goal of eliminating nuclear weapons (which he said might not occur in his lifetime), nuclear proliferation, climate change, tolerance "among people of different faiths and races and religions", peace between and security for Israelis and Palestinians, better social conditions for the world's poor, including "the ability to get an education and make a decent living; the security that you won't have to live in fear of disease or violence without hope for the future." The United States, he said, is "a country that's responsible for ending a war and working in another theater to confront a ruthless adversary that directly threatens the American people and our allies."

The award, he said, "must be shared with everyone who strives for justice and dignity—for the young woman who marches silently in the streets on behalf of her right to be heard even in the face of beatings and bullets; for the leader imprisoned in her own home because she refuses to abandon her commitment to democracy [referring to Aung San Suu Kyi]; for the soldier who sacrificed through tour after tour of duty on behalf of someone half a world away; and for all those men and women across the world who sacrifice their safety and their freedom and sometime their lives for the cause of peace." He did not take questions from reporters after giving his statement.

Obama announced early that he would donate the full 10 million Swedish kronor (about US$1.4 million) monetary award to charity. The largest donations were given to the housing charity Fisher House Foundation who received $250,000, and the Clinton Bush Haiti Fund which received $200,000. Eight organizations which support education also received a donation. $125,000 was donated to the College Summit, the Posse Foundation, the United Negro College Fund, the Hispanic Scholarship Fund, the Appalachian Leadership and Education Foundation, and the American Indian College Fund. $100,000 was donated to Africare, and the Central Asia Institute.

=== In the United States ===
Obama's winning of the peace prize was largely unanticipated and called a "stunning surprise" by The New York Times, though major oddsmaker Centrebet had in fact put him at 7–1 odds of winning, with Piedad Córdoba and Sima Samar at 6–1 and Morgan Tsvangirai at 7–1.

In a USA Today / Gallup Poll conducted October 16–19, 61% of American adults polled responded that they thought Obama did not deserve to win the prize, while 34% responded that he did; when asked if they were personally glad that Obama won the award, 46% of respondents said they were and 47% said they were not glad (poll margin of error +/–3%).

There was widespread criticism of the Nobel Committee's decision from commentators and editorial writers across the political spectrum. The New York Times published a mildly supportive editorial which said the prize was "a (barely) implicit condemnation of Mr. Bush's presidency. But countering the ill will Mr. Bush created around the world is one of Mr. Obama's great achievements in less than nine months in office. Mr. Obama's willingness to respect and work with other nations is another." It said that much remains to be done. Among those agreeing that the award was a criticism of the Bush administration were the editorial pages of the Los Angeles Times, The Wall Street Journal, and The Washington Post, as well as Thomas L. Friedman of The New York Times.

Jonah Goldberg of the National Review said that "surely someone in Iran—or maybe the Iranian protestors generally—could have benefitted more from receiving the prize" while in CounterPunch, political journalist Alexander Cockburn said that, in historical context of other former U.S. Presidents winning the Nobel Peace Prize, the award to Obama "represents a radical break in tradition, since he's only had slightly less than nine months to discharge his imperial duties". Peter Beinart of the Daily Beast called the decision a "farce", while Noam Chomsky said: "In defense of the committee, we might say that the achievement of doing nothing to advance peace places Obama on a considerably higher moral plane than some of the earlier recipients".

Many were critical of the Nobel Committee. A Wall Street Journal editorial, noting Obama's comment that the world's problems "can't be met by any one leader or any one nation", opined, "What this suggests to us—and to the Norwegians—is the end of what has been called 'American exceptionalism'. This is the view that U.S. values have universal application and should be promoted without apology, and defended with military force when necessary. Put in this context, we wonder if most Americans will count this peace-of-the-future prize as a compliment."

The Washington Post columnist Michael Gerson wrote that the committee members "have forfeited any claim to seriousness. Peace—the kind of peace that keeps people from being killed and oppressed—is an achievement, not a sentiment. ... Intending to honor Obama, the committee has actually embarrassed him." Commentary magazine's Peter Wehner wrote that the award, with past awards that seemed aimed at criticizing the Bush administration, showed the Nobel Committee "long ago ceased to be a serious entity; this choice merely confirms that judgment."

According to The Washington Post news analyst Dan Balz, "even among his supporters there was a sense of surprise and even shock on Friday, a belief that the award was premature, a disservice and a potential liability." An editorial in The Washington Post began, "It's an odd Nobel Peace Prize that almost makes you embarrassed for the honoree", and compared the Nobel Committee's statement that Obama had "created a new climate in international politics" to a recent satirical skit on television. A Los Angeles Times editorial said the committee "didn't just embarrass Obama, it diminished the credibility of the prize itself". Thomas L. Friedman of The New York Times wrote, "It dismays me that the most important prize in the world has been devalued in this way".

Much of the commentary across the political spectrum involved describing the award as something risible, with the humor focusing on Obama's getting the award without having accomplished much. According to an analysis in The New York Times, "it ... [is] striking how so many people seemed to greet the Nobel news with shock followed by laughter". On the morning of the announcement, several of The Washington Post's opinion-page columnists, posting at the newspaper's "Post Partisan" blog, characterized the award as laughable or directly satirized it, including such supportive columnists as Ruth Marcus ("ridiculous—embarrassing, even"), Richard Cohen (who satirized the award), and foreign-affairs columnist David Ignatius ("goofy" and "weird"), and Michael Kinsley (whose satirical response came the next day). Other prominent commentators who often supported Obama but responded with ridicule included Peter Beinart and Ann Althouse.

James Taranto wrote in The Wall Street Journal an article summarising various opinions on the Internet, concluding how the award was embarrassing for Obama. He said the award was a "staggeringly premature honor – the equivalent of a lifetime-achievement Oscar for a child star" and that it "makes yesterday's satire into today's news". Fred Greenstein, presidential historian and author and professor of politics emeritus at Princeton University, told Fox News that giving President Obama the Nobel Peace Prize is a "premature canonization" and an "embarrassment to the Nobel process". Slate magazine blogger Mickey Kaus, The New York Times columnist David Brooks and former U.N. ambassador John Bolton amongst others, called for Obama to not accept the award; pundit Michael Crowley argued that it was a "mixed blessing".

Subsequent to the award many Americans now consider that Obama did not deserve it in the light of following events. Opponents of the award cite the expansion of the war on terror and the large increase in the number of drone strikes carried out under Obama, specifically in Pakistan. There have been a number of calls for Obama to either return the award or to have the Nobel Committee recall it, most recently in 2013. In April 2013 a petition was begun asking the Nobel Committee to rescind the Peace Prize. The petition garnered 10,000 signatures in its first day and nearly 20,000 by the end of its first week.

==== Political reaction ====
Nobel laureate and former U.S. vice president Al Gore called the award "extremely well deserved". Obama received congratulations and kind words from other elected officials, such as from House speaker Nancy Pelosi and former rival, Senator John McCain, who said, "As Americans, we're proud when our president receives an award of that prestigious category". RNC chairman Michael Steele discussed his disapproval of the award in a fund-raising letter, writing, "the Democrats and their international leftist allies want America made subservient to the agenda of global redistribution and control."

In 2015, Geir Lundestad, the non-voting Director of the Nobel Institute and secretary for the Nobel Committee at the time of the award, published a memoir, Secretary of Peace. In it, he wrote "In hindsight, we could say that the argument of giving Obama a helping hand was only partially correct. Many of Obama's supporters believed it was a mistake." Lundestad said that Obama had been surprised by the award, and considered not going to Oslo to accept it. He also said in his memoir that Obama had since failed to live up to the Nobel Committee's expectations.

=== In Norway ===
A poll conducted by Synovate for the newspaper Dagbladet showed that 43% of the Norwegian population believed giving Obama the prize was right, while 38% believed it was wrong. 19% had no opinion. The poll showed a sharp divide between younger and older people; of those over 60 years of age 58% were for and only 31% against it. Of those between 18 and 29 years of age, only 25% approved of the decision, while 42% disapproved.

The award divided opinion among politicians. Prime Minister Jens Stoltenberg congratulated Obama for a "well-deserved prize". Siv Jensen, leader of the opposition Progress Party, said that while Obama had taken several good initiatives the committee should have waited to see their results. Erna Solberg, leader of the Conservative Party, also said that the prize came early and increased pressure on Obama to live up to the expectation. Torstein Dahle, the leader of the far leftist party Red, called the award a scandal, citing the fact that Obama was the commander-in-chief of a country at war in Iraq and Afghanistan.

=== Other reactions ===
The response from U.S. allies was generally positive; reactions around the world were mixed or negative.

Several Nobel Laureates commented: Bangladeshi economist Muhammad Yunus (co-winner 2006 prize) said the committee's award was "an endorsement of [Obama] and the direction he is taking". Archbishop Desmond Tutu said the award to Obama "anticipates an even greater contribution towards making our world a safer place for all". Mairead Corrigan (co-winner 1976) expressed her disappointment, stating, "[g]iving this award to the leader of the most militarized country in the world, which has taken the human family against its will to war, will be rightly seen by many people around the world as a reward for his country's aggression and domination." Lech Wałęsa (1983), cofounder of the Solidarity trade union and former president of Poland, said the award was premature. "He has not yet made a real input." The 14th Dalai Lama congratulated Obama.

United Nations Secretary-General Ban Ki-moon praised the Nobel Committee's choice. "We are entering an era of renewed multilateralism ... President Obama embodies the new spirit of dialogue and engagement on the world's biggest problems: climate change, nuclear disarmament and a wide range of peace and security challenges."

In Europe, French President Nicolas Sarkozy said the award would reinforce Obama's determination to work for justice and peace. He added that the award "finally confirms the return of America in the hearts of all the peoples of the world". Dmitry Medvedev, then-president of Russia, said the award would encourage warmer U.S.–Russian relations, and he hoped it would "serve as an additional incentive" for both governments to foster a better "climate in world politics". British Prime Minister Gordon Brown sent a private message of congratulations to President Obama.

Hope that the prize would assist Obama's efforts toward nuclear disarmament was also a part of congratulatory statements from Ireland's Taoiseach Brian Cowen and German Chancellor Angela Merkel. Vatican spokesman Fr. Federico Lombardi said the Vatican "appreciated" the nomination. Kosovar President Fatmir Sejdiu congratulated Obama by saying, "This award is testimony to your success as a leader of a free country aimed at creating a safer and more peaceful world."

In Australia, former Foreign Minister Alexander Downer said that the selection was "a political decision of gross stupidity", laying the blame on the selection committee for a "hideous display of cynical politics". Stuart Rees, director of the Sydney Peace Foundation in Australia, questioned the award. "Perhaps the Nobel organisation wants to give him a magic wand. I think the guy is full of promise, but I don't think the promise has been realised yet particularly in regards the Middle East."

In Asia and the Middle East: Afghanistan's president Hamid Karzai said that Obama was the "appropriate" person to win the Nobel Peace Prize. Siamak Hirai, a spokesman for Karzai, said, "His hard work and his new vision on global relations, his will and efforts for creating friendly and good relations at global level and global peace make him the appropriate recipient of the Nobel Peace Prize". Taliban spokesman Zabiullah Mujahid said the decision was ridiculous, saying, "The Nobel prize for peace? Obama should have won the 'Nobel Prize for escalating violence and killing civilians'."

Indonesia's Masdar Mas'udi, deputy head of the Islamic organisation Nahdlatul Ulama, praised Obama's policy towards his country as confirmation of his worthiness as a Nobel laureate. "I think it's appropriate because he is the only American president who has reached out to us in peace," he said. "On the issues of race, religion, skin colour, he has an open attitude." Japanese Prime Minister Yukio Hatoyama, Indian President Pratibha Patil, and Israeli President and Nobel Peace Prize laureate Shimon Peres sent congratulatory messages to Obama, but Iranian Foreign Minister Manouchehr Mottaki told reporters that "the decision was taken hastily and the award was [too] early".

In Latin America, former Cuban president Fidel Castro called the award "positive" and said the prize should be seen as a criticism to the "genocidal policy" carried out by past U.S. presidents. Venezuelan foreign minister Nicolás Maduro said the award was a surprise and perhaps premature. "As President Hugo Chávez said at the United Nations, (the Obama administration) is a government that has raised expectations and hopes in many people in the world, amid great contradictions."

In Africa, the news of the Obama Nobel Peace Prize was positively received. Kenyan president Mwai Kibaki issued a statement saying that the prize was a "recognition of the contribution [Obama is] making for the well being of humanity". In South Africa, President Jacob Zuma used Ubuntu—the Zulu term for "the importance of community"—in his congratulatory message, saying that the U.S. president's "leadership reflects the true spirit of Ubuntu because your approach celebrates our common humanity." Zimbabwe prime minister Morgan Tsvangirai, who was touted as a possible Nobel laureate, said Obama deserved the honor.

In 2011, Bolivian president Evo Morales and Russian Liberal Democratic Party leader Vladimir Zhirinovsky condemned the award, calling it hypocritical in light of US policy during the Libyan Civil War.

After the death of Anwar al-Awlaki and his son Abdulrahman al-Awlaki by CIA predator drones in Yemen, Nasser al-Awlaki, the father and grandfather of Anwar and Abdulrahman respectively, released an audio message condemning the killings:

I urge the American people to bring the killers to justice. I urge them to expose the hypocrisy of the 2009 Nobel Prize laureate. To some, he may be that. To me and my family, he is nothing more than a child killer.

== Nobel lecture ==
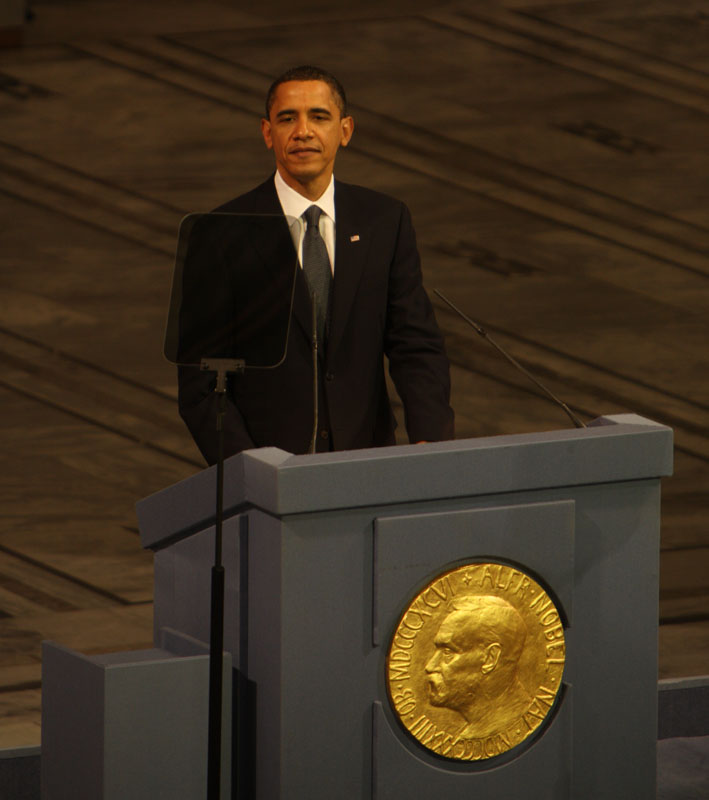
Barack Obama presenting his Nobel lecture

President Obama accepted the Nobel Peace prize in person at the Oslo City Hall in Norway on December 10, 2009. In a 36-minute speech, reportedly written by Obama and then edited by Jon Favreau and Ben Rhodes, he discussed the tensions between war and peace and the idea of a "just war". The address contained elements of the ideas of Reinhold Niebuhr, someone Obama once described as one of his favorite philosophers.

The speech was generally well received by American pundits on both ends of the political spectrum. Several noted similarities between Obama's message and the rhetoric of President George W. Bush. This was also mentioned by former Bush speechwriter Michael Gerson, who called it a "very American speech" and wrote that "Obama was recognizing that the great commitments and themes of American foreign policy are durably bipartisan". A number of prominent Republican politicians publicly praised the speech, including Newt Gingrich and Sarah Palin.

Conservative The New York Times columnist Ross Douthat called it an oftentimes impressive speech that was "An extended defense of using realist means in the service of liberal internationalist ends". Columnist Andrew Sullivan distinguished between the Obama and Bush messages, stating that "Obama is far more conservative than his predecessor" in his views on human imperfection, reality, and war; he also linked the speech back to the tragic nature of Obama's line "the audacity of hope".

To say that force is sometimes necessary is not a call to cynicism – it is a recognition of history; the imperfections of man and the limits of reason.

— Barack Obama

Former Jimmy Carter speechwriter Hendrik Hertzberg said that the speech "will live on for a long time as a text for peacemakers in power". A few commentators were more critical, with former US Ambassador to the UN John Bolton calling it "pedestrian, turgid, and uninspired" and US Congressman Dennis Kucinich "Once we are committed to war's instrumentality in pursuit of peace, we begin the Orwellian journey to the semantic netherworld where war is peace..."

The New York Times praised the eloquence of the speech, noting that "President Obama gave the speech he needed to give, but we suspect not precisely the one the Nobel committee wanted to hear." The Wall Street Journal echoed this sentiment and congratulated Obama for defending the occasional necessity of war and for stating that evil exists in the world, though used the same editorial to criticize him for current disarmament talks with Russia and a lack of progress with Iran and North Korea. The Los Angeles Times lauded the speech as "a blockbuster even by Obama's lofty standards", and even though the ideas were not new, "Obama's special gift is to make them seem achievable by appealing to our higher nature." It was also received well by columnists in The Washington Post.

Abroad, British historian Simon Schama said of the speech that "in its seriousness, bravery and clarity, [it] was on a par with FDR and Churchill" and "summoned the spirit of Cicero".

== Aftermath ==
In 2016, President Obama joked in an interview with Stephen Colbert that even he didn't know why he had received the award.

The secretary of the Norwegian Nobel Committee, Geir Lundestad, said in 2015 that awarding the prize to Obama failed to achieve what the committee hoped it would. "Even many of Obama's supporters believed that the prize was a mistake," he says. "In that sense the committee didn't achieve what it had hoped for."

== See also ==
- List of Nobel Peace Prize laureates
- List of black Nobel Laureates
