= Syse =

Syse is a surname. Notable people with the surname include:

- Henrik Syse (born 1966), Norwegian philosopher, author, and lecturer
- Jan P. Syse (1930–1997), Norwegian lawyer and politician
