= Nobel Peace Center =

Museum in Oslo, Norway

Coordinates: 59°54′41.34″N 10°43′49.73″E

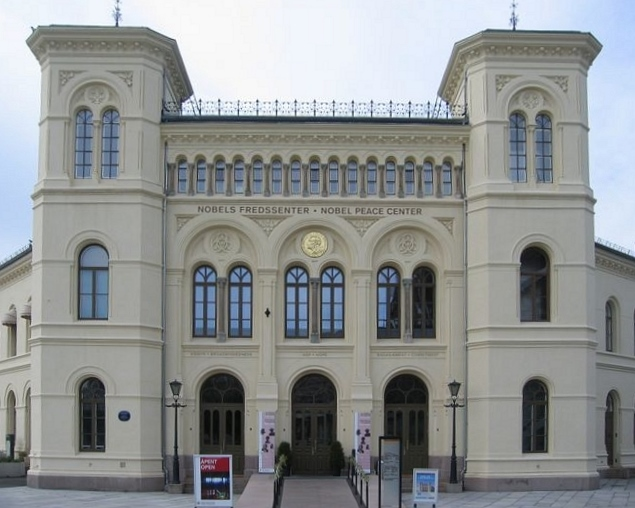
Nobel Peace Center

The Nobel Peace Center (Norwegian: Nobels Fredssenter) in Oslo, Norway, is a showcase for the Nobel Peace Prize and the ideals it represents. The center is also an arena where culture and politics merge to promote involvement, debate and reflection around topics such as war, peace and conflict resolution. The center is located in Oslo, Norway at the City Hall Square (Rådhusplassen).

== History ==
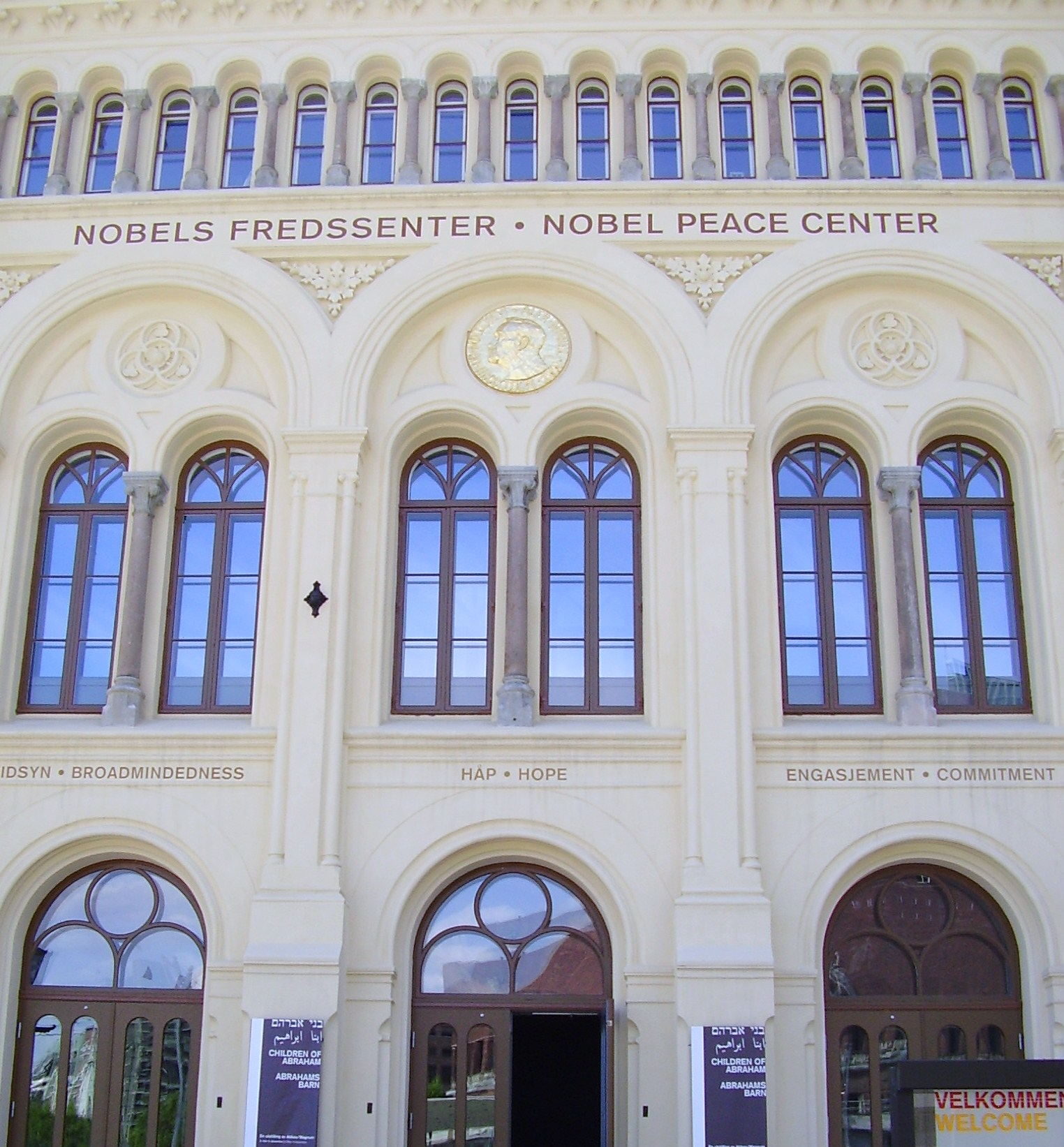
Nobel Peace Center entrance

The Nobel Peace Center was opened in 2005 by His Majesty King Harald V of Norway in a ceremony attended by the royal families of Norway and Canada. Nobel Peace Prize laureate Wangari Maathai was also present. The Center welcomes app 250.000 visitors per year and is one of Norway's most visited museums. The Nobel Peace Center is located in the former Oslo Vestbanestasjon (Oslo West railway station) building. Dating from 1872, the former station building was drawn by architect Georg Andreas Bull (1829–1917). It ceased to be used as a railway station in 1989. It is overlooking the harbor and located close to the Oslo City Hall where the Nobel Peace Prize Award Ceremony takes place every 10 December, to commemorate Alfred Nobel's death.

British architect David Adjaye is responsible for the center's creative design, including its color schemes; the American designer David Small developed its hi-tech installations. The Nobel Peace Center is financed by the Norwegian Ministry of Culture, private sponsors and admission fees. Temporary exhibitions are fully sponsored.

The Center presents the Nobel Peace Prize laureates and their work, in addition to telling the story of Alfred Nobel and the other Nobel prizes. This is done using multimedia and interactive technology, exhibitions, meetings, debates, theater, concerts and conferences, as well as a broad educational program and regular guided tours.

The Nobel Peace Center is a foundation and part of a network of Nobel institutions represented externally by the Nobel Foundation, which also administers informational activities and arrangements surrounding the presentation of the Nobel Prize. Kjersti Fløgstad is director of the Nobel Peace Center. Olav Njølstad is chairman of the center's board, which is appointed by the Norwegian Nobel Committee.

== See also ==
- Nobel Foundation
- Norwegian Nobel Institute
- Nobel Museum
