= August Schou =

Norwegian historian

August Julius Casse Schou (1903–1984) was a Norwegian historian.

He was born in Christiania, and was a brother of Aage Casse Schou. He was director of the Norwegian Nobel Institute and secretary of the Norwegian Nobel Committee from 1946 to 1973.
