= Esther Kostøl =

Norwegian trade union leader (1936–2023)

Esther Marie Kostøl (11 December 1936 – 10 July 2023) was a Norwegian trade union leader. She worked for the Norwegian Civil Servants' Association in 1977, and for the Civil Servants' Cartel from 1978 to 1985. She was secretary for the Norwegian Confederation of Trade Unions from 1985 to 1989 and deputy chair from 1989 to 1997. In 1997, she sat in the Norwegian Nobel Committee.

Kostøl died on 10 July 2023, at the age of 86.
