= Ragnvald Moe =

Norwegian historian (1873–1965)

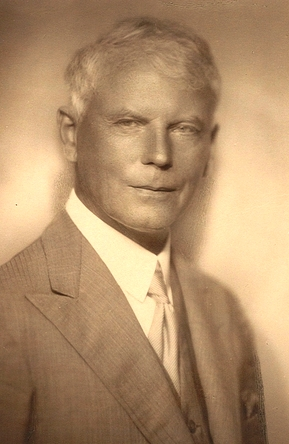
- Moe c. 1930, photographed by Anders Beer Wilse
- Born: 1873; Bergen, Sweden-Norway
- Died: 1965 (aged 91–92)

Ragnvald Moe (1873–1965) was a Norwegian historian.

== Biography ==
Moe was born in Bergen in 1873, and got his cand.philol. degree in 1900. He worked as amanuensis at the University Library of Oslo from 1904 to 1909, then as a secretary of the Norwegian Nobel Committee from 1909, and was director of the Norwegian Nobel Institute from 1928 to 1946. He died in 1965.
