= Asle Amundsen =

Norwegian politician (born 1952)

Asle Amundsen (born 27 June 1952) is a Norwegian politician for the Socialist Left Party.

He served as a deputy representative to the Parliament of Norway from Nordland during the term 1985–1989. He met during 32 days of parliamentary session. He was the first deputy of Hanna Kvanmo. Outside of politics, he worked as a farmer in Andøy Municipality.
