= Hanna Kvanmo =

Norwegian politician (1926–2005)

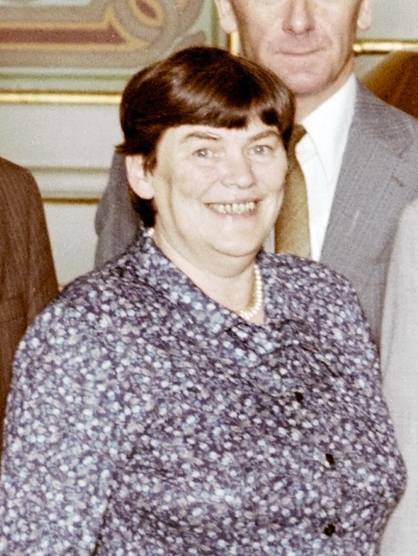

Member of the Storting
- In office 1973–1989
- Constituency: Nordland

Parliamentary leader of the Socialist Left Party
- In office 1977–1989
- Succeeded by: Kjellbjørg Lunde

Member of the Norwegian Nobel Committee
- In office 1991–2002

Vice chair of the Norwegian Nobel Committee
- In office 1993–1998
- Preceded by: Gidske Anderson
- Succeeded by: Gunnar Berge

Personal details
- Born: Hanna Kristine Hansen; June 14, 1926 Sandtorg, Norway
- Died: June 23, 2005 (aged 79) Arendal, Norway
- Party: Socialist Left Party
- Profession: Teacher

Hanna Kristine Kvanmo (June 14, 1926 – June 23, 2005) was a Norwegian politician for the Socialist Left Party. She served as a Member of Parliament from 1973 to 1989, representing the county of Nordland, as the first parliamentary leader of the Socialist Left Party from 1977 to 1989. She was a member of the Norwegian Nobel Committee from 1991 to 2002, and served as the committee's vice chair from 1993 to 1998. During her term on the Nobel committee, she participated in the decisions to award the Nobel Peace Prize to individuals such as Aung San Suu Kyi, Nelson Mandela, Yasser Arafat and Kofi Annan. She worked for the thoroughly nazified German Red Cross in the ending years of the Second World War, and she was convicted for treason following her repatriation to Norway in 1947.

By profession, she was a teacher.

== Early life ==
Hanna Kvanmo grew up in a working-class family in the Norwegian town Harstad. Her father was a fisherman and her mother was a factory worker. Her parents were divorced, and she was brought up mostly by her mother.

As an 18-year-old (in 1944), Kvanmo joined the German Red Cross as a nursing student. She was stationed for some time on the Eastern Front, and in the last days of the war, she worked as a practical nurse in Berlin. After the German defeat, she was interned in the British sector of Germany; she was returned to Norway in late 1947 where she was tried and convicted for treason. She received an 8-month prison sentence and a ten-year suspension of her rights as a citizen; the prison sentence was suspended after an appeal to the Supreme Court.

== Career ==
After several years as a single mother working as a cleaning lady and cook, she married and passed the university entrance exam (examen artium) with distinction and worked as a gymnasium teacher at Rana Gymnasium from 1962 to 1973.

Kvanmo joined local politics in Rana, and in 1973 she was elected to the Storting, representing the Socialist Left Party (SV). From 1977 she served as the parliamentary leader for the party. In 1975 and 1981 she was also a delegate to the UN general assembly. From 1985 to 1989, her vararepresentant was Asle Amundsen. She retired from parliament in 1989. From 1991 to 2002, she was a member of the Norwegian Nobel Committee, serving as the committee's vice chairman 1993-1998.

Her activities during the war were often questioned later in her political career in the Socialist Left Party. She described her perspective and her reasons for joining the German war effort in a book in 1990. The book sold approximately 83,000 copies in Norway, and was considered a best-seller.

Kvanmo was an opponent of the EU. After her retiring from parliament she moved with her husband to southern Norway and the town of Arendal.

== Views ==
She was highly critical of Egyptian President Anwar Sadat and Israeli Prime Minister Menachem Begin for their efforts of negotiating Israeli–Egyptian peace in the late 1970s. The Socialist Left Party, with Hanna Kvanmo as its leader, was the only party in the Norwegian Parliament that advocated recognizing the Palestine Liberation Organization in the 1980s. She later wished to withdraw the Peace Prize awarded to Israeli Prime Minister Shimon Peres.

== Books ==
- Derfor (1985)
- Glis (1986)
- Dommen (1990)
- Anders Langes saga (1993, with A. Rygnestad).
