= Henrik Syse =

Norwegian philosopher, author, and lecturer

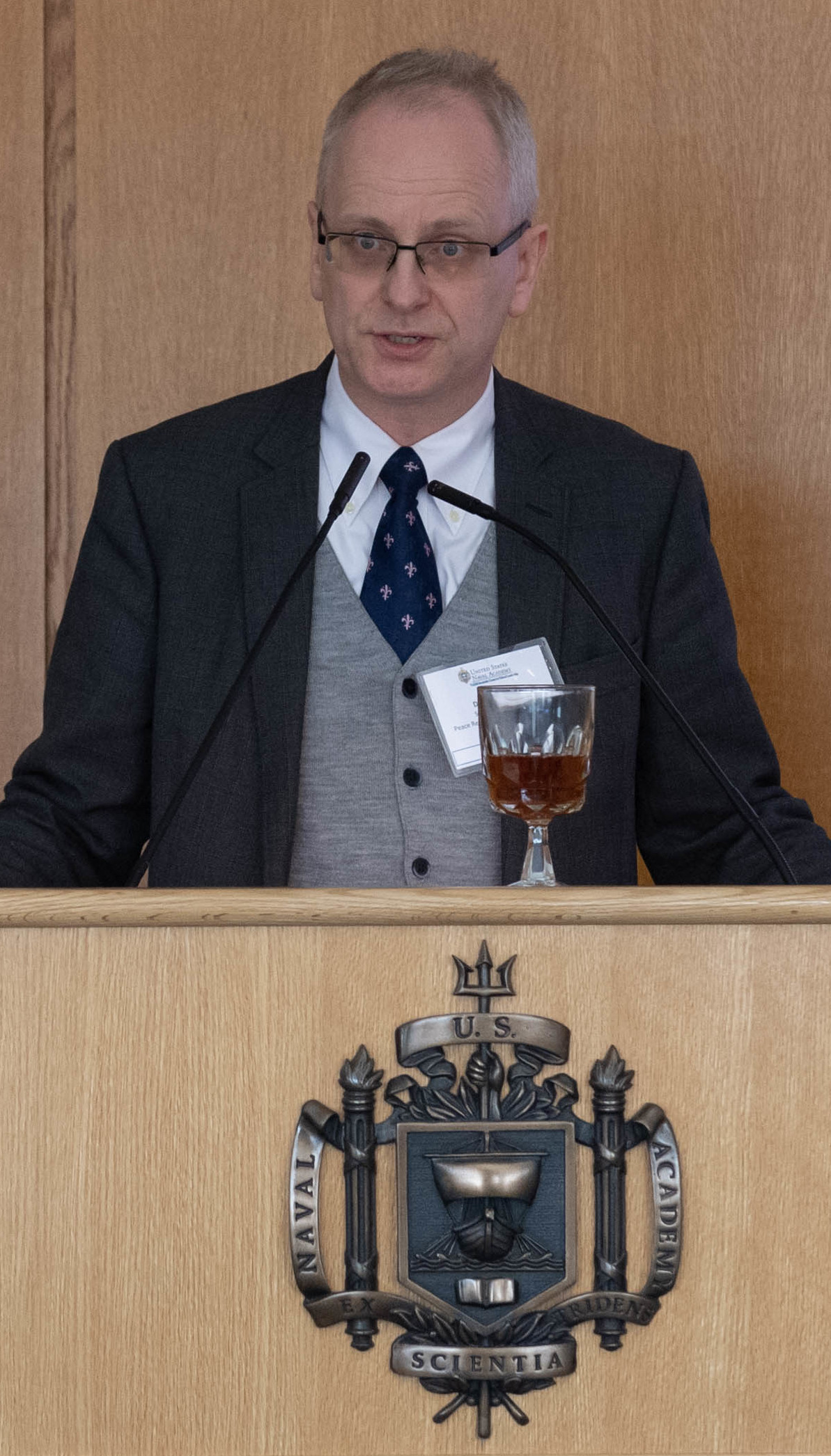
- Syse in 2019
- Born: 19 April 1966 (age 60); Oslo, Norway
- Education: University of Oslo (Dr.Art., equivalent to Ph.D.), Boston College (MA)
- Scientific career
- Fields: Philosophy, Ethics, Political theory, Religion
- Workplaces: Peace Research Institute Oslo

Henrik Syse (born 19 April 1966) is a Norwegian philosopher, author, and lecturer. He is a research professor at the Peace Research Institute Oslo (PRIO), and a part-time Professor of Peace and Conflict Studies at Bjørknes College in Oslo. He was a member of the Norwegian Nobel Committee, which awards the Nobel Peace Prize, from 2015 to 2020, and was a member of the Norwegian Press Complaints Commission from 2002 to 2016. Syse also teaches at the Norwegian Defence University College, BI Norwegian Business School, MF Norwegian School of Theology, the University of Oslo, and other institutions of higher learning, and he is Chief Editor (with Martin L. Cook) of the Journal of Military Ethics, a peer-reviewed journal published by Taylor & Francis.

Henrik Syse was Head of Corporate Governance for Norges Bank Investment Management (NBIM), which manages Europe's largest sovereign wealth fund, the Government Pension Fund of Norway Global, from 2005 to 2007, and he continued, until 2009, as an advisor and consultant on social issues for NBIM.

He has published in the fields of philosophy, politics, religion, and ethics, including business ethics and professional ethics. He was nominated as a Young Global Leader by the World Economic Forum in Davos in 2007. He is a much-used lecturer in Norway and abroad.

At PRIO, Henrik Syse specializes in the ethics and laws of armed conflict, as well as other issues within international ethics, and he also works on questions related to free speech, identity, values, and the aftermath of the 22 July 2011 Norway attacks.

Among his publications in English are The Ethics of War: Classic and Contemporary Readings (edited with Gregory Reichberg and Endre Begby, Blackwell, 2006), Natural Law, Religion, and Rights (St. Augustine's Press, 2007), and Religion, War, and Ethics: A Sourcebook of Textual Traditions (edited with Gregory Reichberg and Nicole Hartwell, Cambridge University Press, 2014). He has published academic articles in journals such as Security Dialogue, Journal of Peace Research, Augustinian Studies, Modern Age, Nordic Journal of Applied Ethics, Corporate Governance, and Journal of Military Ethics. He has published several books in Norwegian on issues such as faith and reason, free speech, and applied ethics.

Syse holds a Cand.Mag. (Bachelor of Arts) degree from the University of Oslo (1989), a Master of Arts degree from Boston College, USA (1991), and a Dr. Art. (Ph.D.) degree from the University of Oslo (1997). While at Boston College, he held a Fulbright Scholarship.

Syse is the son of former Norwegian Prime Minister and Member of Parliament Jan P. Syse (1930–1997). He is an active Sunday School teacher in his local church at Fagerborg in Oslo, and is also a regular guest in Norwegian National Broadcasting (NRK), not only speaking about politics and philosophy, but also as a featured guest discussing The Beatles on the popular radio show Herreavdelingens platesjappe. He is married to Senior Advisor Hanna Helene Syse (b. 1965), and they have four children.
