= Kristin Clemet =

Norwegian politician (born 1957)

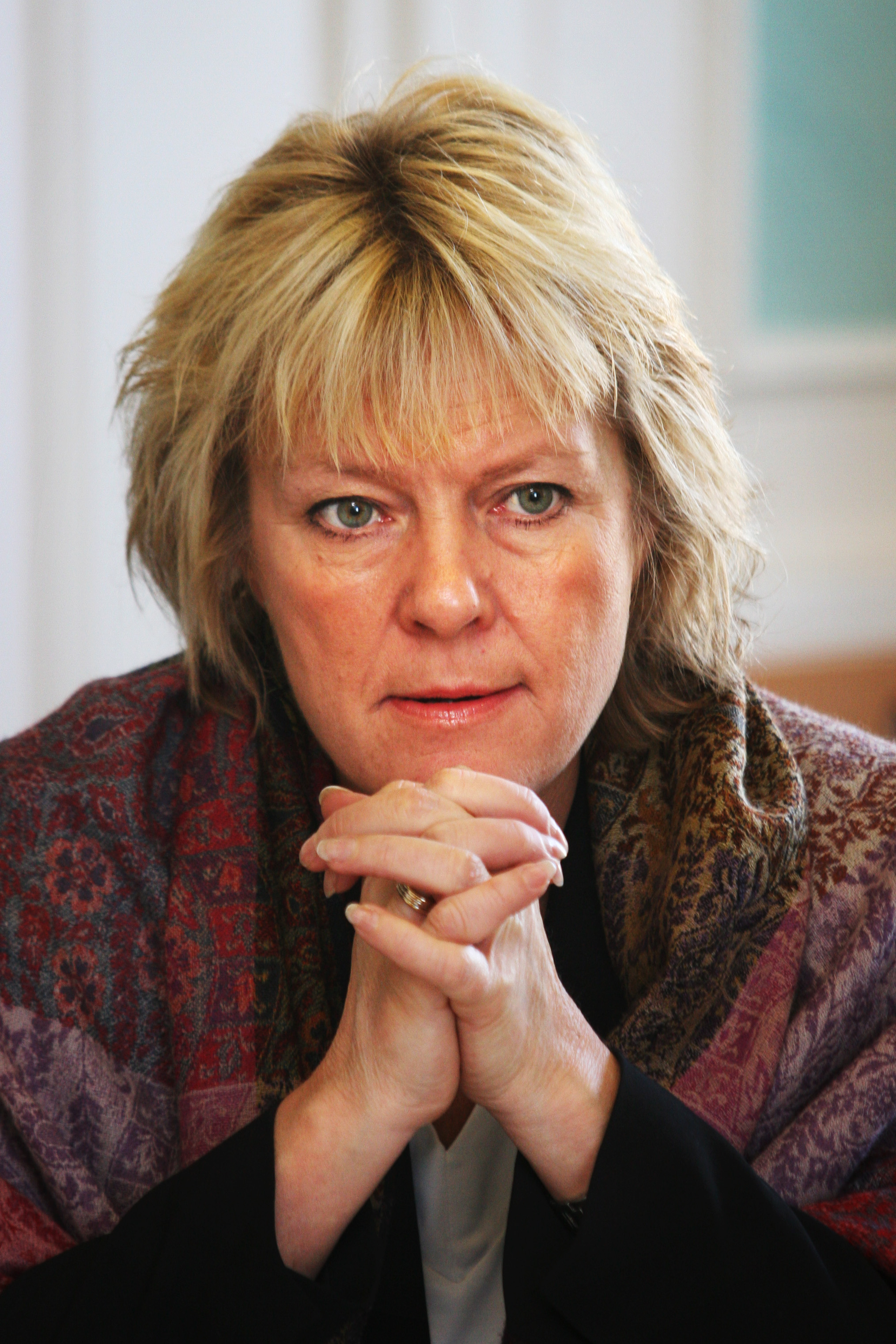

Minister of Education and Research
- In office 19 October 2001 – 17 October 2005
- Prime Minister: Kjell Magne Bondevik
- Preceded by: Trond Giske
- Succeeded by: Øystein Djupedal

Minister of Labour and Government Administration
- In office 2 November 1989 – 3 November 1990
- Prime Minister: Jan P. Syse
- Preceded by: Oddrunn Pettersen
- Succeeded by: Tove Strand

Personal details
- Born: 20 April 1957 (age 69) Harstad, Norway
- Party: Conservative
- Spouse: Michael Tetzschner

Kristin Clemet (born 20 April 1957 in Harstad) is a Norwegian politician for Høyre, Norway's Conservative Party.

She was elected to the Norwegian Parliament from Oslo in 1989, but was not re-elected in 1993. She had previously served as a deputy representative during the term 1985–1989.

From 1981 to 1983, during the first cabinet Willoch, Clemet was appointed personal secretary (today known as political advisor) in the Ministry of Industry. From 1985 to 1986, during the second cabinet Willoch, she was personal secretary in the Office of the Prime Minister. In November 1989, during the cabinet Syse, she was Minister of Government Administration and Labour. During this period her seat in parliament was taken by Kari Garmann.

From 2001 to 2005, when the second cabinet Bondevik held office, Clemet was Minister of Education and Research. As Minister of Education and Research, Clemet became known for her work in carrying out "The Quality Reform" (Kvalitetsreformen) in the Norwegian university system.

Kristin Clemet graduated with a Bachelor of Commerce degree from NHH in 1981 and has a long history of public service. She was editor-in-chief of the Conservative Party's journal Tidens Tegn 1993–1997 and vice managing director of the Confederation of Norwegian Enterprises from 1997 to 2001. Today she is the leader of Civita, a liberal think tank based in Oslo.

Clemet lives together with party fellow Michael Tetzschner; they have two children. Her father Fridtjov Clemet was general secretary of the Conservative Party from 1975 to 1985.

== See also ==
- List of members of the Norwegian Nobel Committee

Political offices
Preceded by Oddrun Pettersen	Norwegian Minister of Labour and Government Administration; 1989–1990	Succeeded by Tove Strand Gerhardsen
Preceded by Trond Giske	Norwegian Minister of Education and Research; 2001–2005	Succeeded by Øystein Djupedal
