= League of peace =

Philosophical concept of Immanuel Kant

League of peace (Latin: foedus pacificum) is an expression coined by Immanuel Kant in his work "Perpetual Peace: A Philosophical Sketch". The league of peace should be distinguished from a peace treaty (pactum pacis) because a peace treaty prevents or terminates only one war, while the league of peace seeks to end all wars forever. This league does not hold any power of the state, but only exists for "the maintenance and security of the freedom of the state and of other states in league with it, without there being any need for them to submit to civil laws and their compulsion, as men in a state of nature must submit."

== See also ==
- League of Nations
- Peace treaty
- Perpetual peace
- United Nations
- World peace
- World government, or "Weltrepublik"
