= Geir Lundestad =

Norwegian historian (1945–2023)

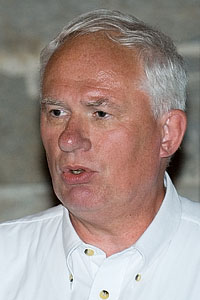
- Lundestad in 2005
- Born: 17 January 1945; Sulitjelma, Norway
- Died: 22 September 2023 (aged 78); Oslo, Norway
- Occupation: Historian
- Known for: Director, Norwegian Nobel Institute; Secretary, Norwegian Nobel Committee
- Spouse: Aase Synnøve Liland

Geir Lundestad (17 January 1945 – 22 September 2023) was a Norwegian historian, who served as the director of Norwegian Nobel Institute when Olav Njølstad took over until 2014. In this capacity, he also served as the secretary of Norwegian Nobel Committee, although he was not a member of committee itself.

== Earl and personal life ==
Geir Lundestad was born on 17 January 1945 in Sulitjelma, to the son of rector Bjarne Lundestad and Anny Elvine Nilsen-Nygaard.

He married Aase Synnøve Liland in 1967.

== Career ==
Lundestad studied history at the University of Oslo and University of Tromsø, graduating in 1970 with a cand.philol. degree and in 1976 with a doctorate respectively. From 1974 to 1990, he held various positions as Lecturer and Professor at the University of Tromsø before beginning his positions with the Norwegian Nobel Institute and Committee. Subsequently, he was associated with the University of Oslo as an Adjunct Professor of International History. Lundestad spent several years in the United States as a research fellow, at Harvard University, from 1978 to 1979 and again in 1983, and at the Woodrow Wilson Center in Washington, D.C., between 1988 and 1989.

From 1990 to 2014, he served as the director of Norwegian Nobel Institute, as well as being secretary of Norwegian Nobel Committee. During this period, Nobel Institute became a significant institution for research on contemporary history, where Lundestad contributed in his capacity as expert on American history and Cold War. He was also a proponent for establishing Nobel Peace Center, which opened in 2005. The Nobel Prize is the subject of Lundestad's final book, The World's Most Prestigious Prize: The Inside Story of the Nobel Peace Prize.

Lundestad was a member of the Norwegian Academy of Science and Letters. He was decorated Commander of the Order of St. Olav in 2008.

Lundestad died on 22 September 2023, at the age of 78.

== Select bibliography ==
- The American Non-Policy Towards Eastern Europe 1943–1947. (Oslo, New York City, 1975, reprinted 1978)
- America, Scandinavia, and the Cold War 1945–1949. (New York City, Oslo, 1980)
- East, West, North, South: Major Developments in International Politics Since 1945. (Oslo - Oxford, 1987, updated in 1991, 1996, 1999, 2004, 2010 and 2014) English, Norwegian, Swedish, Russian, Chinese and Turkish editions.
- The American "Empire" and Other Studies of US Foreign Policy in Comparative Perspective. (Oxford - Oslo, 1990)
- Beyond the Cold War: New Dimensions in International Relations. (edited with Odd Arne Westad, Oslo - Oxford, 1993)
- The Fall of Great Powers, Peace, Stability, and Legitimacy. (edited by Lundestad, Oxford - Oslo, 1994)
- "Empire " by Integration: The United States and European Integration 1945–1997. (Oxford, 1998.) Japanese edition 2005.
- No End to Alliance. The United States and Western Europe: Past, Present, and Future. (edited by Lundestad, Macmillan 1998.)
- 'Imperial Overstretch', Mikhail Gorbachev, and the End of the Cold War (edited by Lundestad, 2000)
- “The Nobel Peace Prize” in Agneta Wallin Levinovitz and Nils Ringertz, eds., The Nobel Prize. The First 100 Years. (London – Singapore, 2001).
- War and Peace in the 20th Century and Beyond . (edited with Olav Njølstad, Singapore, 2002)
- The United States and Western Europe Since 1945: From “Empire” by Invitation to Transatlantic Drift. (Oxford, 2003, paperback 2005), Norwegian edition 2004.
- Just Another Major Crisis? The United States and Europe Since 2000. (edited by Lundestad, Oxford 2008)
- The Rise and Decline of the American "Empire". Power and its Limits in Comparative Perspective. (Oxford, 2012)
- International Relations Since the end of the Cold War. New & Old Dimensions in International Relations. (edited by Lundestad, Oxford, 2013)
- 'The World's Most Prestigious Prize: The Inside Story of the Nobel Peace Prize'. Oxford, United Kingdom; New York, NY: Oxford University Press. 2019. ISBN 978-0-19-884187-6.
