= Nobel Peace Prize =

One of five Nobel Prizes

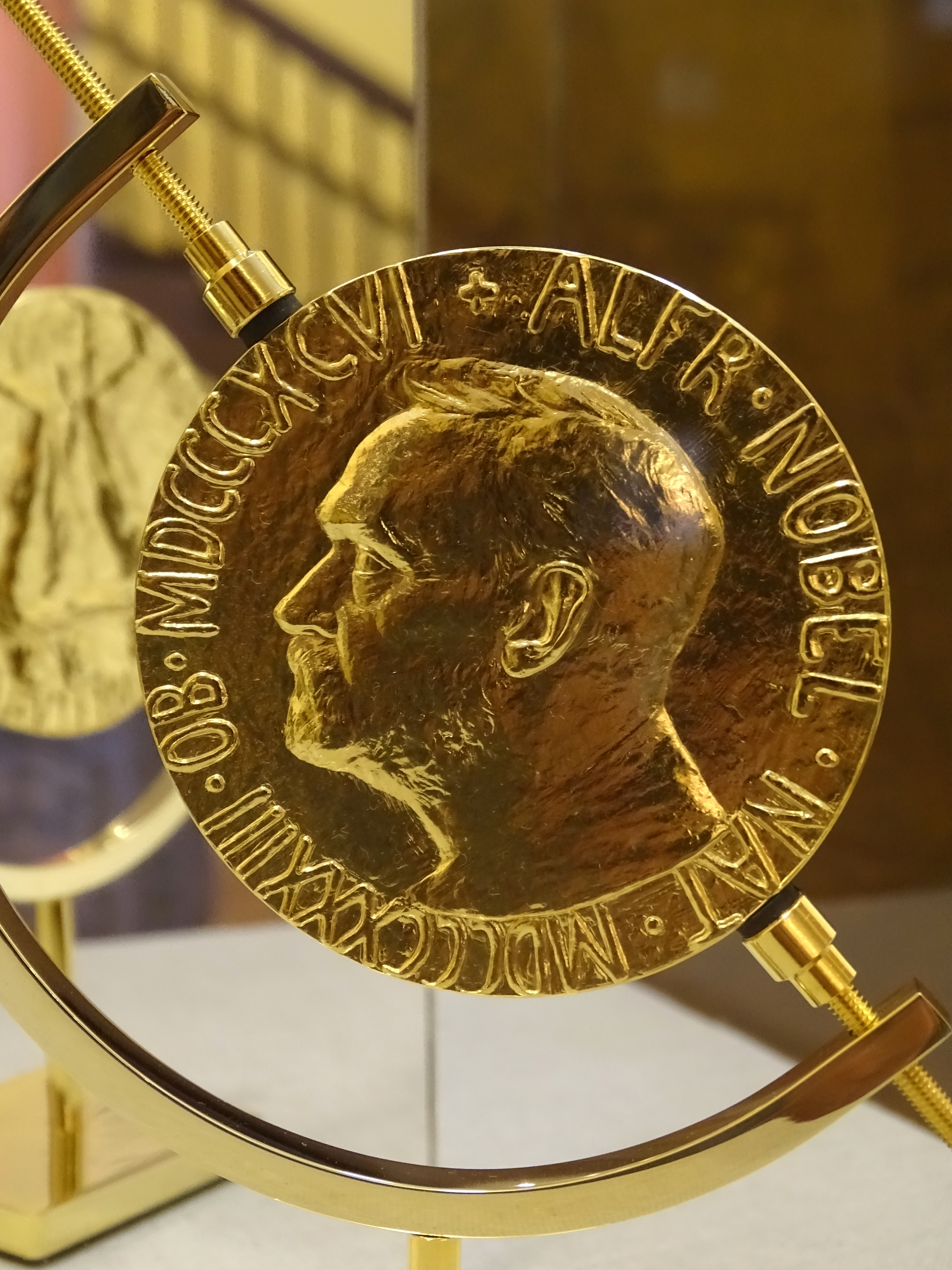
- Jimmy Carter's 2002 Nobel Peace Prize
- Awarded for: Outstanding contributions to peace: arms reduction, international cooperation, and organisations contributing to peace, and human rights contributions to peace
- Location: Oslo, Norway
- Presented by: Norwegian Nobel Committee on behalf of the estate of Alfred Nobel
- Rewards: 11 million SEK (2023); 10 million SEK (2022)
- First award: 10 December 1901; 124 years ago
- Most recent recipient: Navi Pillay (2026)

Highlights
- Most awards: International Committee of the Red Cross (3)
- Website: nobelprize.org/peace

The Nobel Peace Prize (Note: Swedish and Norwegian: Nobels fredspris) is one of the five original Nobel Prizes established by the will of Swedish industrialist, inventor, and armaments manufacturer Alfred Nobel, along with the prizes in Chemistry, Physics, Physiology or Medicine, and Literature.

Since March 1901, it has been awarded annually (with some exceptions) to people who have "done the most or the best work for fraternity between nations, for the abolition or reduction of standing armies and for the holding and promotion of peace congresses". The Oxford Dictionary of Contemporary History describes it as "the most prestigious prize in the world".

In accordance with Nobel's will, the prize is selected by the Norwegian Nobel Committee, a five-member committee appointed by the Parliament of Norway unlike all the other awards chosen by the Swedish Nobel Committee. The prize award ceremony has been held in Oslo City Hall since 1990, previously in the assembly hall of the University of Oslo (1947–1989), Norwegian Nobel Institute (1905–1946), and the Parliament (1901–1904).

Due to its political nature, the Nobel Peace Prize has for most of its history been subject to numerous controversies. The 2026 prize was awarded to Navi Pillay for her efforts to promote peace and international law.

== Background ==
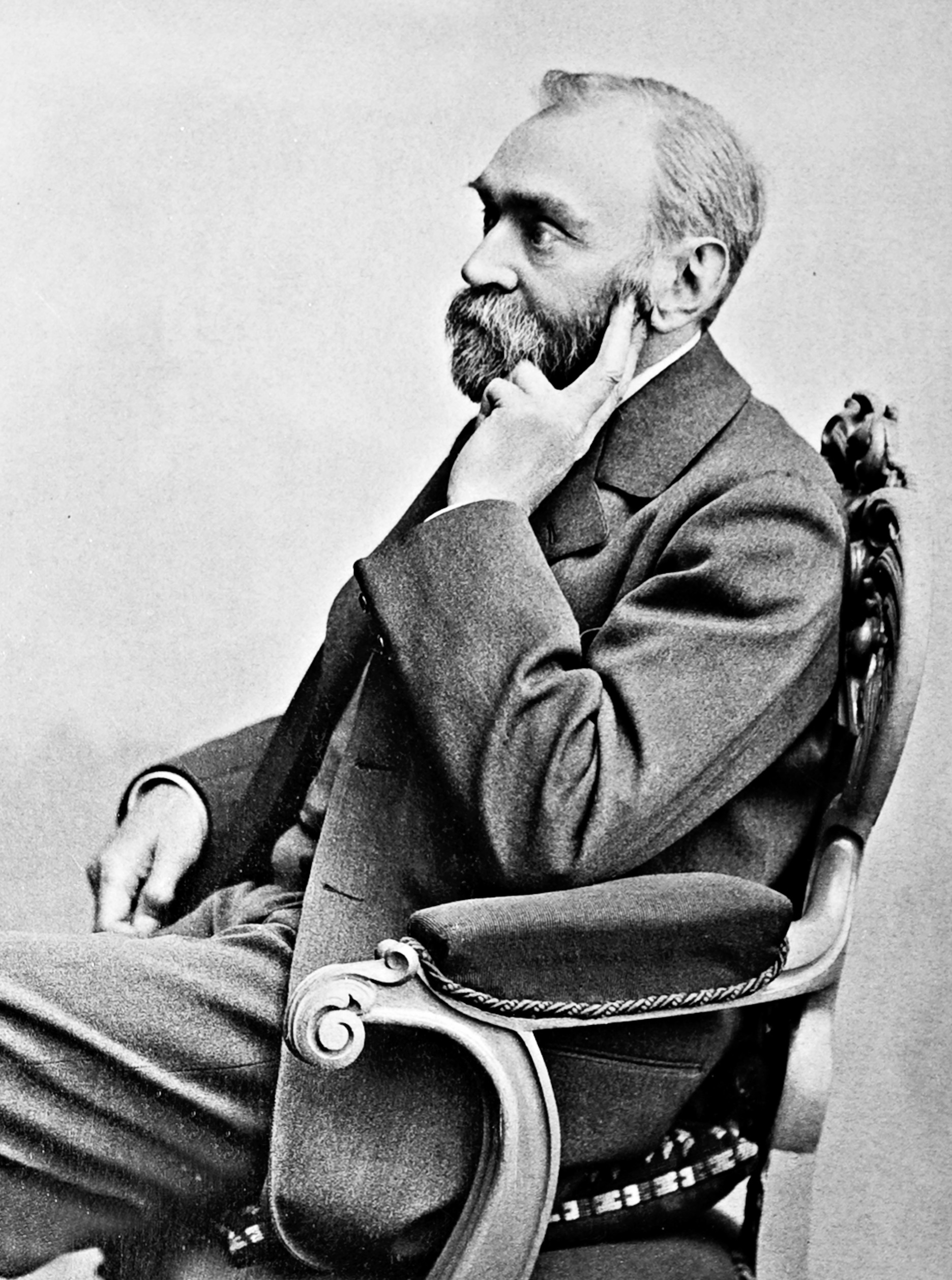
Alfred Nobel, whose will established the Peace Prize

According to Nobel's will, the Peace Prize is awarded to the person who in the preceding year "shall have done the most or the best work for fraternity between nations, for the abolition or reduction of standing armies and for the holding and promotion of peace congresses". Alfred Nobel's will further specified that the prize be awarded by a committee of five people chosen by the Norwegian Parliament.

Nobel died in 1896 and he did not leave an explanation for choosing peace as a prize category. As he was a trained chemical engineer, the categories for chemistry and physics were obvious choices. The reasoning behind the peace prize is less clear. According to the Norwegian Nobel Committee, his friendship with Bertha von Suttner, a peace activist and later recipient of the prize, profoundly influenced his decision to include peace as a category. Some Nobel scholars suggest it was Nobel's way to compensate for developing destructive forces. His inventions included dynamite and ballistite, both of which were used violently during his lifetime. Ballistite was used in war and the Irish Republican Brotherhood, an Irish nationalist organization, carried out dynamite attacks in the 1880s. Nobel was also instrumental in turning Bofors from an iron and steel producer into an armaments company.

There is a well known, but reportedly apocryphal, story that in 1888, after the death of his brother Ludvig, several newspapers published obituaries of Alfred by mistake. The French newspaper Ideotie Quotidienne allegedly condemned him for his invention of military explosives and this is said to have brought about his decision to leave a better legacy after his death. The obituary supposedly stated, Le marchand de la mort est mort ("The merchant of death is dead"), and went on to say, "Dr. Alfred Nobel, who became rich by finding ways to kill more people faster than ever before, died yesterday." However, it has been questioned whether or not the obituary in question actually existed. Although the anecdote has appeared frequently in biographies and popular accounts, more recent investigative work has been unable to confirm the existence of either the alleged obituary or the newspaper often cited as having published it, suggesting that the story may be an unsubstantiated myth.

It is unclear why Nobel wished the Peace Prize to be administered in Norway, which was ruled in union with Sweden at the time of Nobel's death. The Norwegian Nobel Committee speculates that Nobel may have considered Norway better suited to awarding the prize, as it did not have the same militaristic traditions as Sweden. It also notes that at the end of the 19th century, the Norwegian parliament had become closely involved in the Inter-Parliamentary Union's efforts to resolve conflicts through mediation and arbitration.

== Nomination and selection ==
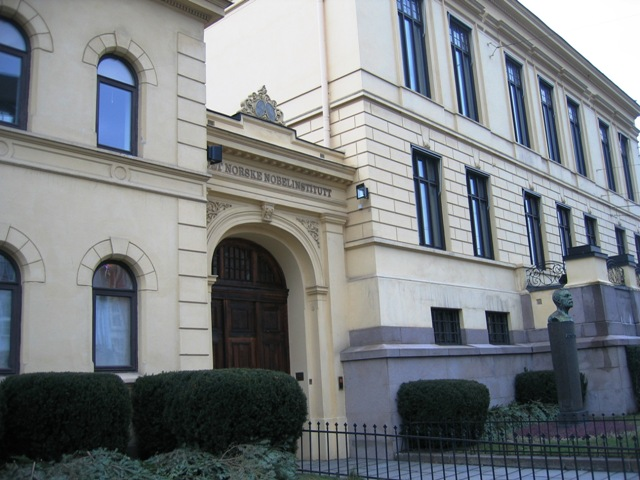
The Norwegian Nobel Institute in Oslo, Norway

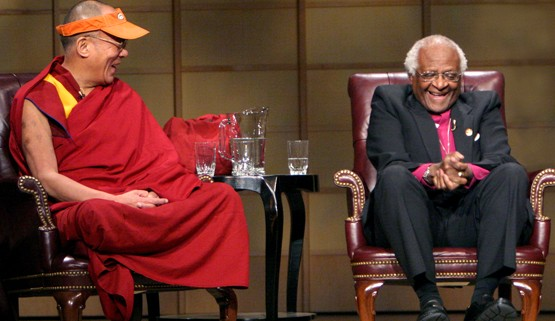
The 14th Dalai Lama and Archbishop Desmond Tutu, Nobel Peace Prize laureates

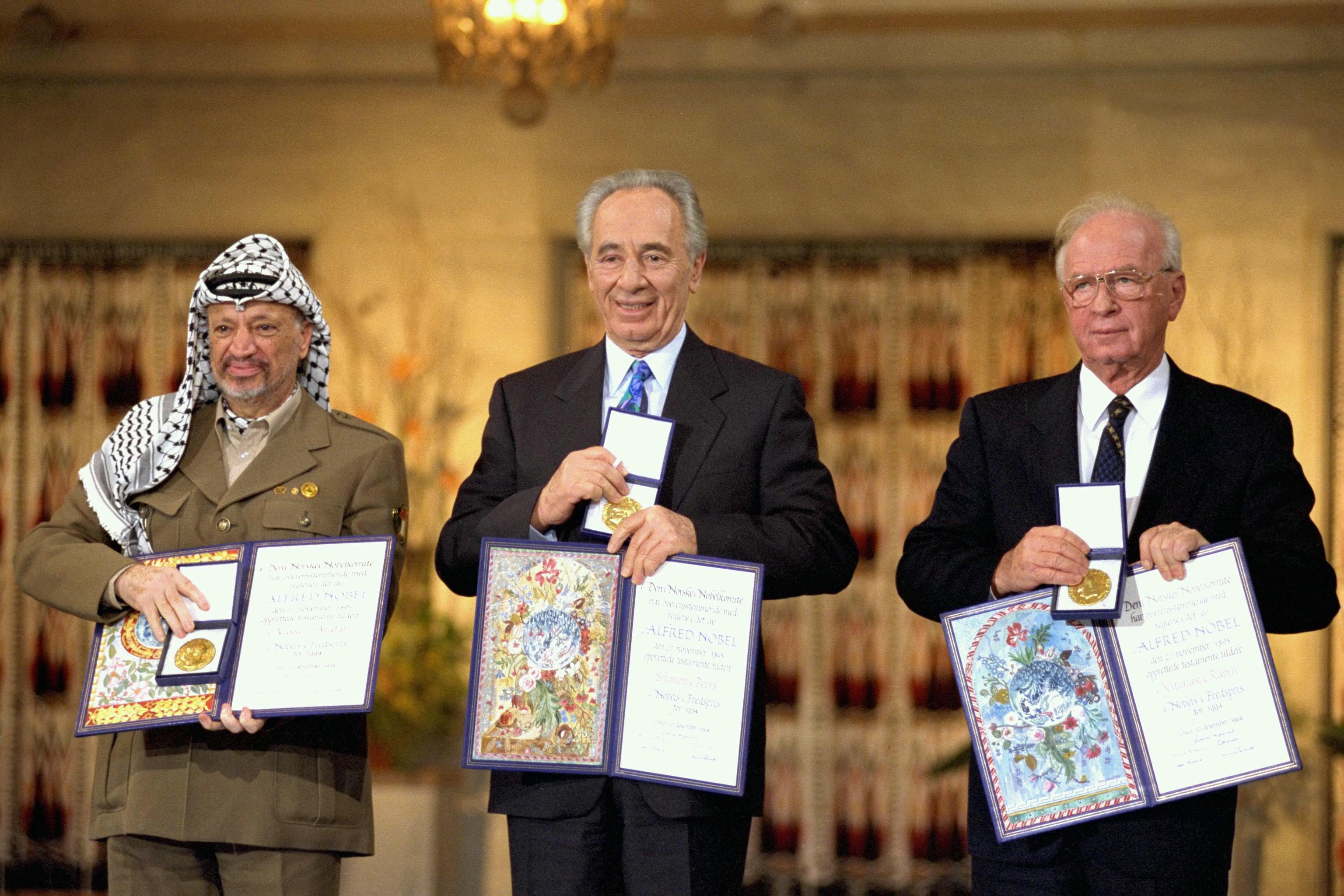
Yasser Arafat, Shimon Peres and Yitzhak Rabin displaying their 1994 Nobel Peace Prize

The Norwegian Parliament appoints the Norwegian Nobel Committee, which selects the Nobel Peace Prize laureate.

=== Nomination ===
Each year, the Norwegian Nobel Committee specifically invites qualified people to submit nominations for the Nobel Peace Prize. The statutes of the Nobel Foundation specify categories of individuals who are eligible to make nominations for the Nobel Peace Prize. These nominators are:

- Members of national assemblies and governments and members of the Inter-Parliamentary Union
- Members of the Permanent Court of Arbitration and the International Court of Justice at the Hague
- Members of Institut de Droit International
- Academics at the professor or associate professor level in history, social sciences, philosophy, law, theology and religion; vice-chancellors/presidents of universities and university directors (or their equivalents); directors of peace research institutes and foreign policy institutes
- Previous recipients, including board members of organizations that have received the prize
- Present and past members of the Norwegian Nobel Committee
- Former permanent advisers to the Norwegian Nobel Institute

The working language of the Norwegian Nobel Committee is Norwegian; in addition to Norwegian the committee has traditionally received nominations in French, German, and English, but today most nominations are submitted in either Norwegian or English. Nominations must usually be submitted to the committee by the beginning of February in the award year. Nominations by committee members can be submitted up to the date of the first Committee meeting after this deadline.

In 2009, a record 205 nominations were received, but the record was broken again in 2010 with 237 nominations; in 2011, the record was broken once again with 241 nominations. The statutes of the Nobel Foundation do not allow information about nominations, considerations, or investigations relating to awarding the prize to be made public for at least 50 years after a prize has been awarded. Over time, many individuals have become known as "Nobel Peace Prize Nominees", but this designation has no official standing, and means only that one of the thousands of eligible nominators suggested the person's name for consideration. Indeed, in 1939, Adolf Hitler received a satirical nomination from a member of the Swedish parliament, mocking the (serious but unsuccessful) nomination of Neville Chamberlain. Nominations from 1901 to 1974 have been released in a database.

=== Selection ===
Nominations are considered by the Nobel Committee at a meeting where a shortlist of candidates for further review is created. This shortlist is then considered by permanent advisers to the Nobel institute, which consists of the institute's Director and Research Director, and a small number of Norwegian academics with expertise in subject areas relating to the prize. Advisers usually have some months to complete reports, which are then considered by the committee to select the laureate. The Committee seeks to achieve a unanimous decision, but it is not always possible. The Nobel Committee typically comes to a conclusion in mid-September, but occasionally the final decision has not been made until the last meeting before the official announcement at the beginning of October.

== Awarding the prize ==
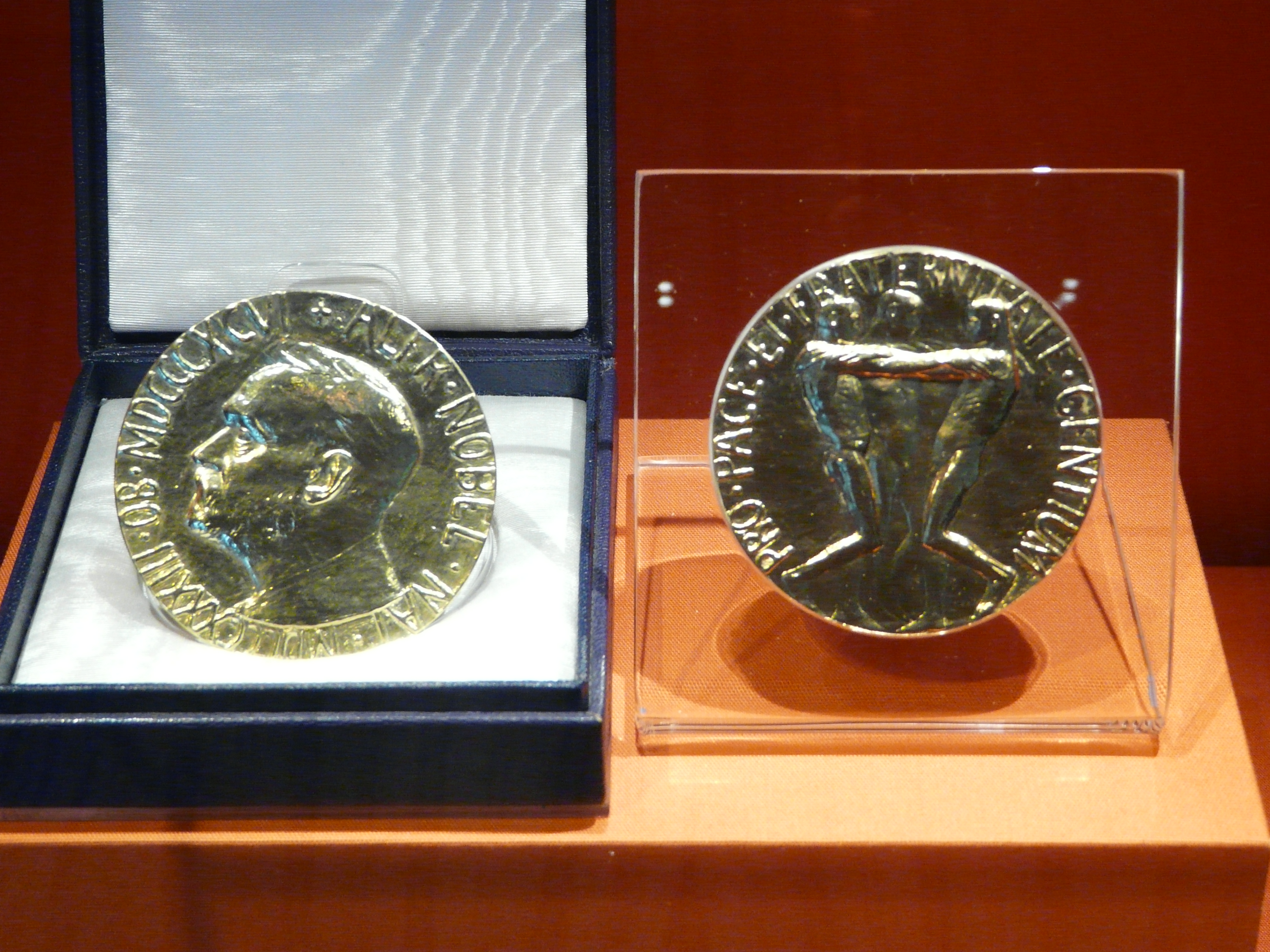
Obverse and reverse of Jimmy Carter's Nobel Peace Prize Medal

The Chairman of the Norwegian Nobel Committee presents the Nobel Peace Prize in the presence of the King of Norway and the Norwegian royal family on 10 December each year (the anniversary of Nobel's death). The Peace Prize is the only Nobel Prize not presented in Stockholm. The Nobel laureate receives a diploma, a medal, and a document confirming the prize amount. The money awarded varies over time, depending on the profitability of the Nobel bequest's investments and the exchange rate to the recipient's local currency. In 1901 when the Nobel Prizes were awarded for the first time, the sum per prize was 150,782 Swedish kronor. In 2026, the amount was announced as 12 million Swedish kronor, which at that time equaled about 1,215,000 USD.

Since 1990, the ceremony has taken place at Oslo City Hall. From 1947 to 1989, the Nobel Peace Prize ceremony was held in the Atrium of the University of Oslo Faculty of Law, a few hundred meters from Oslo City Hall. Between 1905 and 1946, the ceremony took place at the Norwegian Nobel Institute. From 1901 to 1904, the ceremony took place in the Storting (Parliament).

== Medal ==
The medal for the Peace Prize was designed by the Norwegian sculptor Gustav Vigeland in 1901. Vigeland's profile sculpture of Alfred Nobel differs from Erik Lindberg's profile of Nobel on the chemistry, literature, physics, and physiology or medicine medals. The dies for Vigeland's peace medal were made by Lindberg as Vigeland was not an engraver. The reverse of the medal features three men in a 'fraternal bond' and the inscription "Pro pace et fraternitate gentium" ("For the peace and brotherhood of men"). The edge of the medal is inscribed with the year of its awarding, with the name of its recipient and "Prix Nobel de la Paix".

== Laureates ==
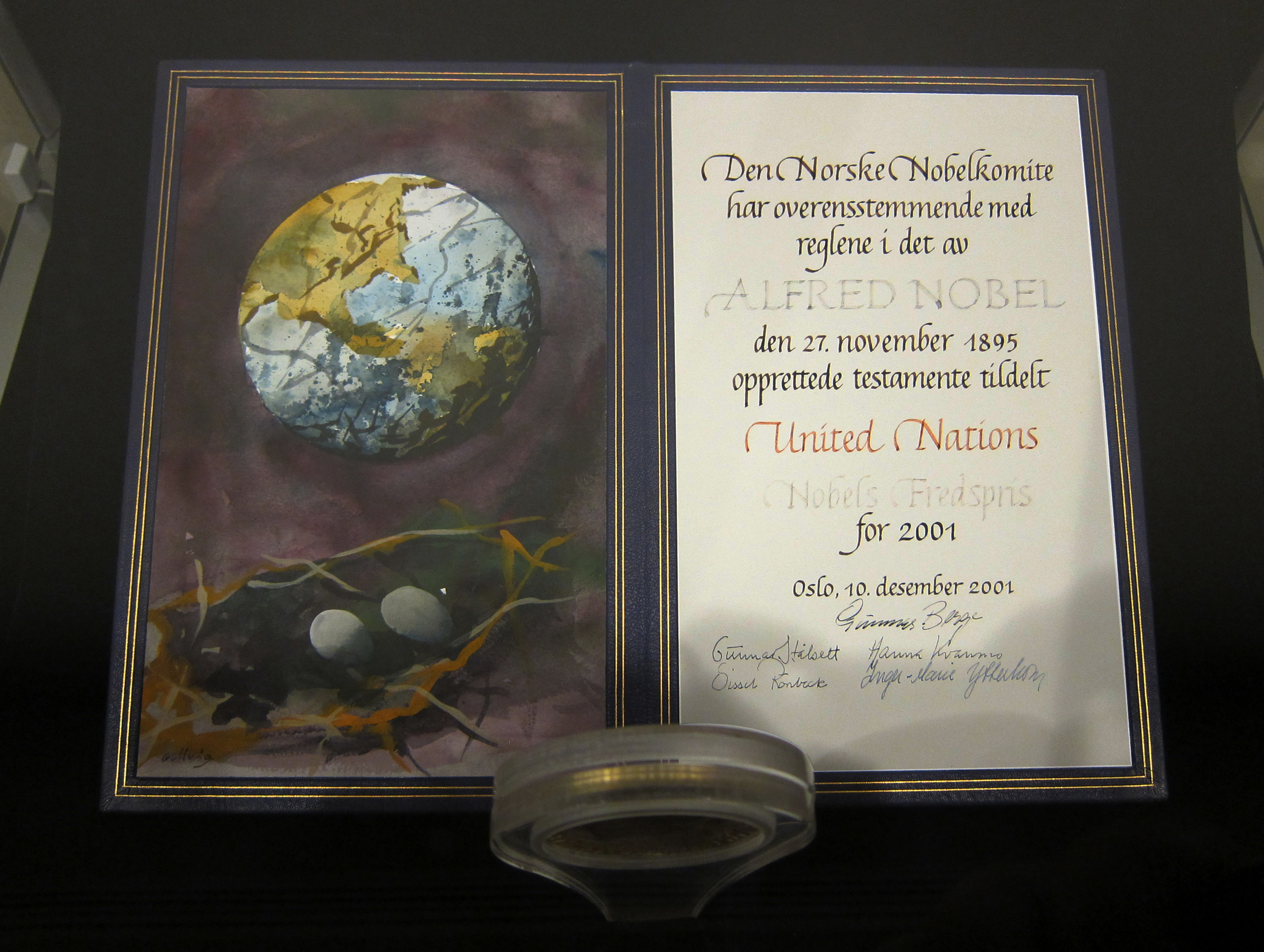
View of a diploma – Nobel Peace Prize 2001, United Nations

As of October 2026, the Peace Prize has been awarded to 113 individuals and 28 organizations; 21 women have won the Nobel Peace Prize, more than for any other Nobel Prize. Only two recipients have won multiple Prizes: the International Committee of the Red Cross has won three times (1917, 1944, and 1963) and the Office of the United Nations High Commissioner for Refugees has won twice (1954 and 1981). Lê Đức Thọ is the only person who has voluntarily refused to accept the prize.

== Criticism ==
Some commentators have suggested that the Nobel Peace Prize has been awarded in politically motivated ways for more recent or immediate achievements, or with the intention of encouraging future achievements. Some commentators have suggested that to award a peace prize on the basis of unquantifiable contemporary opinion is unjust or possibly erroneous, especially as many of the judges cannot themselves be said to be impartial observers. Further criticism holds that the Nobel Peace Prize has become increasingly politicized, in which people are awarded for aspirations rather than accomplishments, which has allowed for the prize to be used for political effect but can cause perverse consequences including the breakdown of fragile peace processes due to the failure to account for the realities of power politics.

In 2011, a feature story in the Norwegian newspaper Aftenposten contended that major criticisms of the award were that the Norwegian Nobel Committee ought to recruit members from professional and international backgrounds, rather than retired members of parliament; that there is too little openness about the criteria that the committee uses when they choose a recipient of the prize; and that the adherence to Nobel's will should be more strict. In the article, Norwegian historian Øivind Stenersen argues that Norway has been able to use the prize as an instrument for nation-building and furthering Norway's foreign policy and economic interests. In another 2011 Aftenposten opinion article, the grandson of one of Nobel's two brothers, Michael Nobel, also criticised what he believed to be the politicisation of the award, claiming that the Nobel Committee has not always acted in accordance with Nobel's will. Author Christopher Hitchens called the Nobel Peace Prize "a huge bore and a fraud" in his memoir Hitch-22.

=== Criticism of individual conferments ===
Barack Obama with Thorbjørn Jagland at the 2009 Nobel Peace Prize ceremony

Nobel Peace Prize controversies often reach beyond the academic community. Criticisms that have been levelled against some of the awards include allegations that they were politically motivated, premature, or guided by a faulty definition of what constitutes work for peace. The awards given to Mikhail Gorbachev, Yitzhak Rabin, Shimon Peres and Yasser Arafat, Lê Đức Thọ, Henry Kissinger, Jimmy Carter, Barack Obama, Abiy Ahmed, the European Union, and María Corina Machado have all been the subject of controversy. The 1973 award to Henry Kissinger and Lê Đức Thọ may have been the most controversial, with two members of the selection committee resigning in protest and widespread derision in the press.

=== Notable omissions ===
Foreign Policy has listed Corazon Aquino, Mahatma Gandhi, Eleanor Roosevelt, Václav Havel, and Ken Saro-Wiwa as people who "never won the prize, but should have." The omission of Mahatma Gandhi has been particularly widely discussed, including in public statements by various members of the Nobel Committee. The committee has confirmed that Gandhi was nominated in 1937, 1938, 1939, 1947, and, finally, a few days before his assassination in January 1948. The omission has been publicly regretted by later members of the Nobel Committee.

Geir Lundestad, Secretary of the Norwegian Nobel Committee in 2006 said, "The greatest omission in our 106-year history is undoubtedly that Mahatma Gandhi never received the Nobel Peace Prize. Gandhi could do without the Nobel Peace prize, whether Nobel committee can do without Gandhi is the question." In 1948, following Gandhi's death, the Nobel Committee declined to award a prize on the grounds that "there was no suitable living candidate" that year. Later, when the Dalai Lama was awarded the Peace Prize in 1989, the chairman of the committee said that it was "in part a tribute to the memory of Mahatma Gandhi".

== See also ==
- Gandhi Peace Prize – Annual award by the Indian government
- Lenin Peace Prize – Soviet state award for international recipients
- Sakharov Prize – European award for human rights
- Ibrahim Prize – Annual prize awarded to former African heads of state for respect of democracy
