= Norwegian Nobel Committee =

Committee that awards the Nobel Peace Prize

- Den Norske Nobelkomité
- Headquarters: Oslo, Norway
- Members: 5 members
- Website: nobelpeaceprize.org

The Nobel Peace Prize

The Norwegian Nobel Committee (Norwegian: Den Norske Nobelkomité) selects the recipients of the Nobel Peace Prize each year on behalf of Swedish industrialist Alfred Nobel's estate, based on instructions of Nobel's will.

Five members are appointed by Norway's parliament, the Storting, which was tasked by Nobel with selecting the winners of the Nobel Peace Prize in his will. At the time, there was a union between Sweden and Norway, with a common monarch and common foreign policy. Although it is composed of members appointed by the Storting, the committee is a private body tasked with awarding a private prize. In recent decades, most committee members were retired politicians.

The committee is assisted by its secretariat, the Norwegian Nobel Institute. The committee holds their meetings in the institute's building, where the winner is also announced. Since 1990, however, the award ceremony takes place in Oslo City Hall.

== History ==
Alfred Nobel died in December 1896. In January 1897 the contents of his will were unveiled. It was written as early as in 1895. He declared that a Nobel Peace Prize should be awarded "to the person who shall have done the most or the best work for fraternity between nations, for the abolition or reduction of standing armies and for the holding and promotion of peace congresses". Nobel donated funds for the prize, and the Nobel Foundation now manages the assets. It is not known why Nobel wished the Peace Prize to be administered in Norway—specifically "by a committee of five persons to be selected by the Norwegian Storting"—although until 1905 there was a union between Sweden and Norway, and the other prizes were to be awarded by Swedish institutions (the Royal Swedish Academy of Sciences, the Nobel Assembly at the Karolinska Institute, the Swedish Academy). A new body had to be created: the Norwegian Nobel Committee.

Jurist Fredrik Heffermehl has noted that a legislative body could not necessarily be expected to handle a judicial task like managing a legal will. The task of a parliament is to create and change laws whereas a will cannot be changed unless the premises are clearly outdated. However, this question was not debated in depth, out of contemporary fear that the donated money might be lost in legal battles if the body was not created soon. On 26 April 1897 the Norwegian Parliament accepted the assignment and on 5 August the same year it formalized the process of election and service time for committee members. The first Peace Prize was awarded in 1901 to Henri Dunant and Frédéric Passy. The committee was initially composed of active members of the Storting and the annual reports were discussed in parliamentary sessions. These ties to the Storting were later weakened so that the committee became more independent. Accordingly, the name was changed from the Norwegian Nobel Committee to the Nobel Committee of the Norwegian Parliament (Norwegian: Det norske Stortings Nobelkomité) in 1901, but changed back in 1977. Sitting members of the Storting and the government have since been barred from sitting on the committee, unless they have explicitly stated their intent to not stand for re-election.

Nonetheless, the committee is still composed mainly of politicians. A 1903 proposition to elect a law scholar (Ebbe Hertzberg) was rejected. In late 1948, the election system was changed to make the committee more proportional with parliamentary representation of Norwegian political parties. The Norwegian Labour Party, which controlled a simple majority of seats in the Norwegian Parliament orchestrated this change. This practice has been cemented, but sharply criticized. There have been propositions about including non-Norwegian members in the committee, but this has never happened.

The Norwegian Nobel Committee is assisted by the Norwegian Nobel Institute, established in 1904. The committee might receive well more than a hundred nominations and asks the Nobel Institute in February every year to research about twenty candidates. The director of the Nobel Institute also serves as secretary to the Norwegian Nobel Committee; currently this position belongs to Olav Njølstad.

== List of Chairpersons ==
List of chairpersons

- 1900–1901: Bernhard Getz
- 1901–1922: Jørgen Løvland
- 1922–1922: Hans Jacob Horst
- 1922–1941: Fredrik Stang
- 1941–1943: Gunnar Jahn
- 1944–1945: see below
- 1945–1945: Carl Joachim Hambro
- 1945–1966: Gunnar Jahn
- 1967–1967: Nils Langhelle
- 1967–1967: Bernt Ingvaldsen

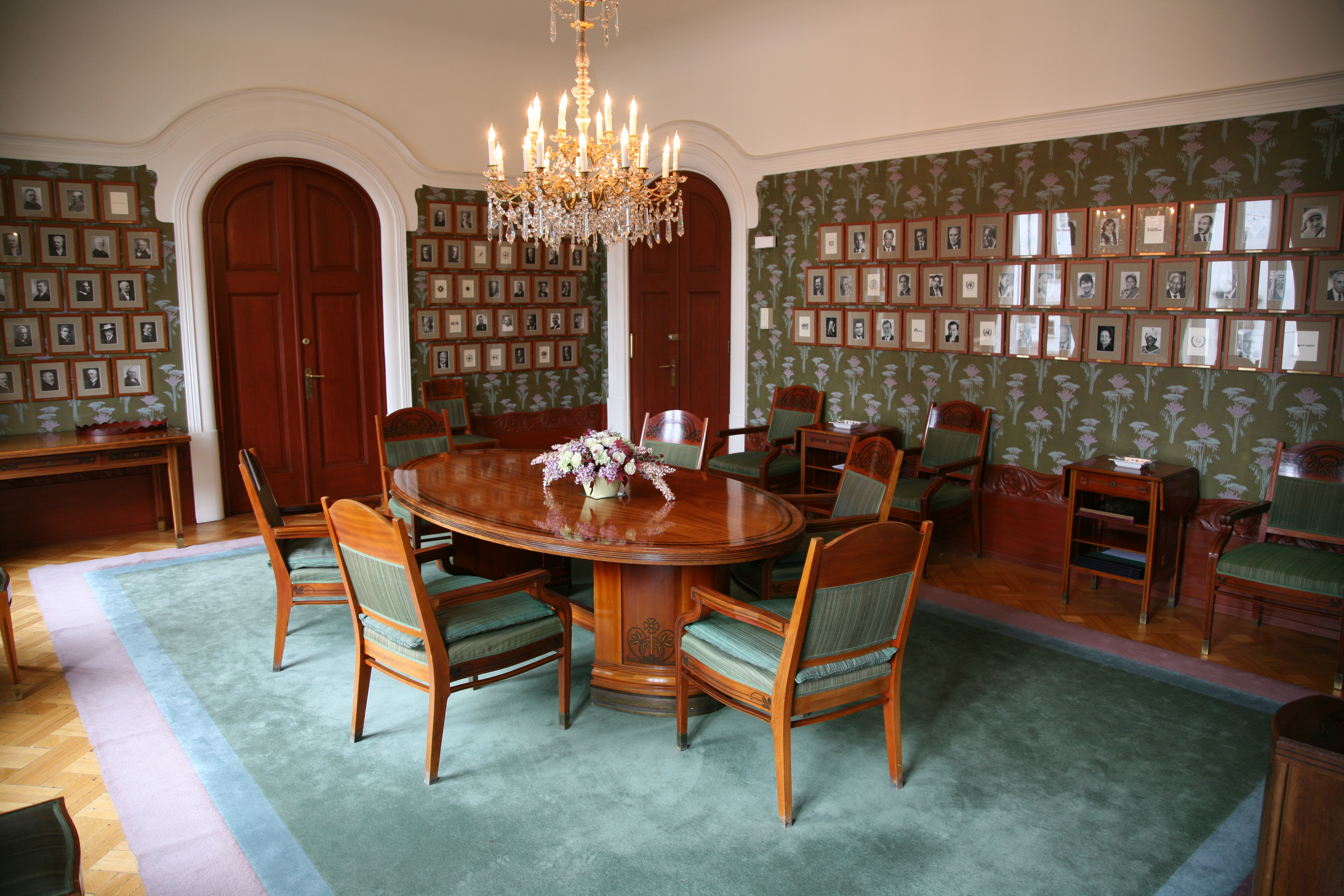
Inside of Norwegian Nobel Institute

- 1968–1978: Aase Lionæs
- 1979–1981: John Sanness
- 1982–1990: Egil Aarvik
- 1990–1990: Gidske Anderson
- 1991–1999: Francis Sejersted
- 2000–2002: Gunnar Berge
- 2003–2008: Ole Danbolt Mjøs
- 2009–2015: Thorbjørn Jagland
- 2015–2017: Kaci Kullmann Five
- 2017–2023: Berit Reiss-Andersen
- 2024–present: Jørgen Watne Frydnes

In January 1944 an attempt by the Quisling government to take over the functions of the Nobel Committee led to the resignation of Jahn and other committee members. The Swedish consulate-general in Oslo formally took over the management of the Foundation's Oslo property on behalf of the Nobel Foundation.

== Members ==
The members as of 2025 are:

- Anne Enger, former Leader of the Centre Party and Minister of Culture, appointed for the period 2018–2020 and reappointed for the period 2021–2026
- Asle Toje (Vice Chair), foreign policy scholar, appointed for the period 2018–2023 and reappointed for the period 2024–2029
- Kristin Clemet, former Conservative Party cabinet member who previously represented Oslo in the Storting, appointed for the period 2021–2026
- Jørgen Watne Frydnes (Chair), businessman and nonprofit leader, appointed for the period 2021–2026
- Gry Larsen, former Labour Party Foreign Affairs Secretary of Norway, appointed for the period 2024–2029

== Secretariat ==
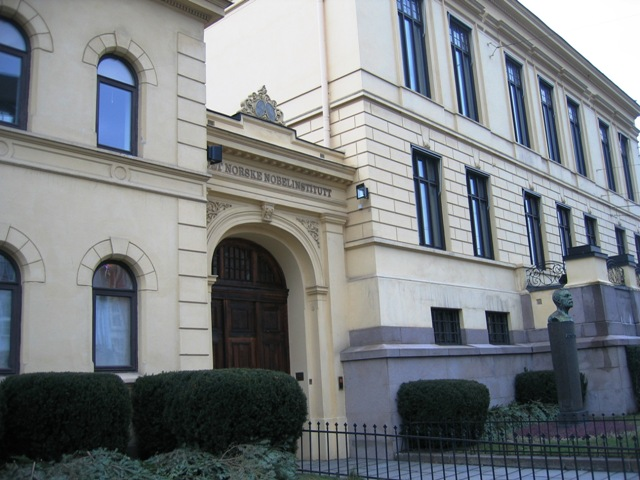
The Norwegian Nobel Institute, where the committee holds its meetings

The committee is assisted by the Norwegian Nobel Institute, its secretariat. The leader of the institute holds the title secretary. The secretary is not a member of the committee, but is an employee of the Norwegian Nobel Institute.

List of secretaries

- 1901–1909: Christian Lous Lange
- 1910–1945: Ragnvald Moe
- 1946–1973: August Schou
- 1974–1977: Tim Greve
- 1978–1989: Jakob Sverdrup
- 1990–2015: Geir Lundestad
- 2015–2025: Olav Njølstad
- 2025–present: Kristian Berg Harpviken
