= Norwegian Nobel Institute =

Organization in Oslo, Norway

Coordinates: 59°54′55.08″N 10°43′19.85″E

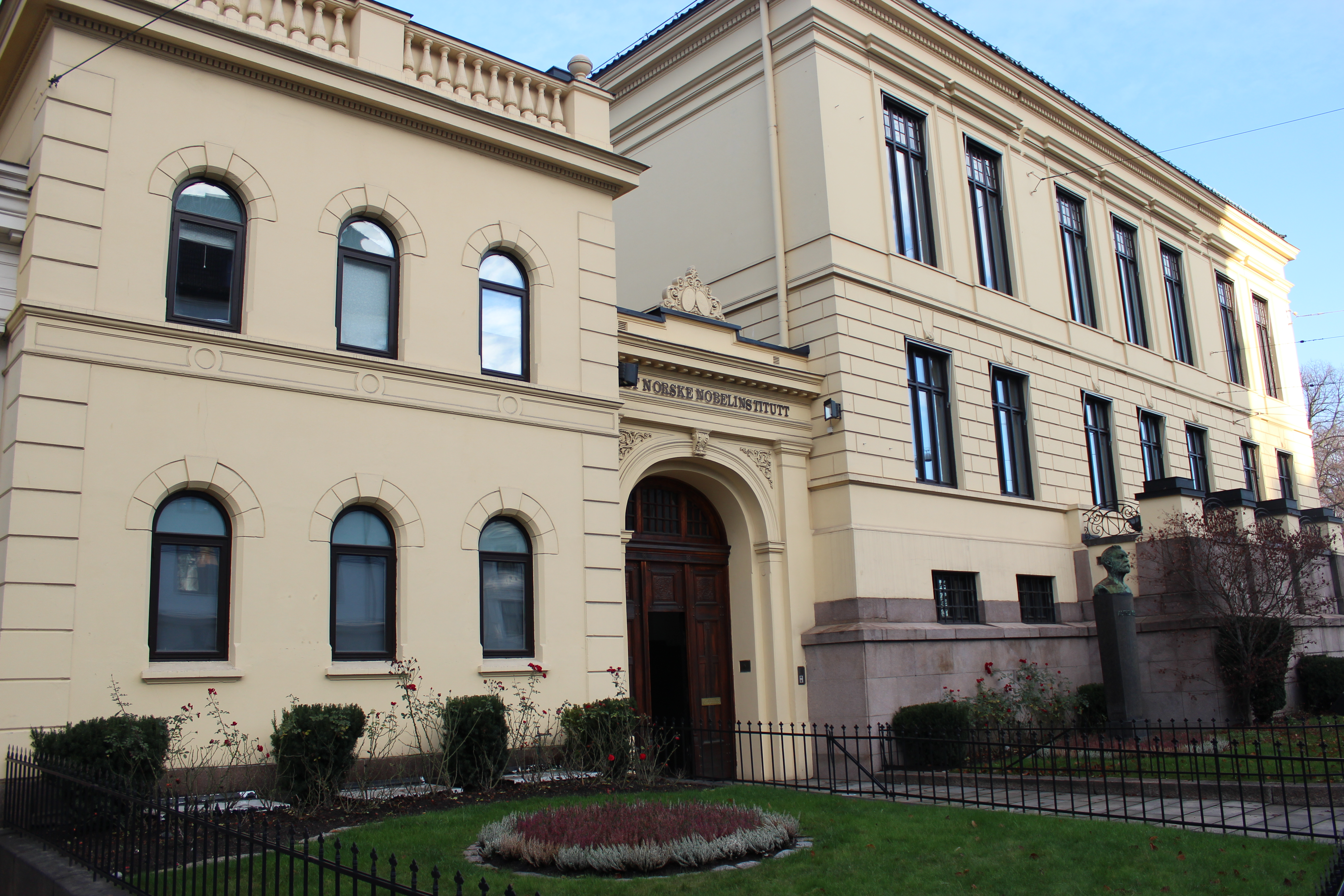
Norwegian Nobel Institute in Oslo

The Norwegian Nobel Institute (Norwegian: Det Norske Nobelinstitutt) is located in Oslo, Norway. The institute is located at Henrik Ibsen Street 51 in the center of the city, close to the Royal Palace.

== History ==
The institute was established in 1904 in Kristiania (today Oslo). The principal duty of the Nobel Institute is to assist the Norwegian Nobel Committee in the task of selecting the recipient(s) of the annual Nobel Peace Prize and to organize the Nobel award event in Oslo.

The institute's library, with some 204,000 titles, related to peace, conflict, and international relations, is the largest of its kind in Norway. The institute also has its own research department, organizing research related to peace and war. The institute awards a few annual visiting fellowships to distinguished international scholars. The institute arranges meetings, seminars and lectures in addition to holding the so-called Nobel Symposia, exchanges of views and information to which it invites specialists from many countries.

As of 1 January 2025, the institute's director is Kristian Berg Harpviken.

== See also ==
- Nobel Peace Center
