= Worood Zuhair =

Iraqi women's rights activist (born 1987)

- ورود زهير
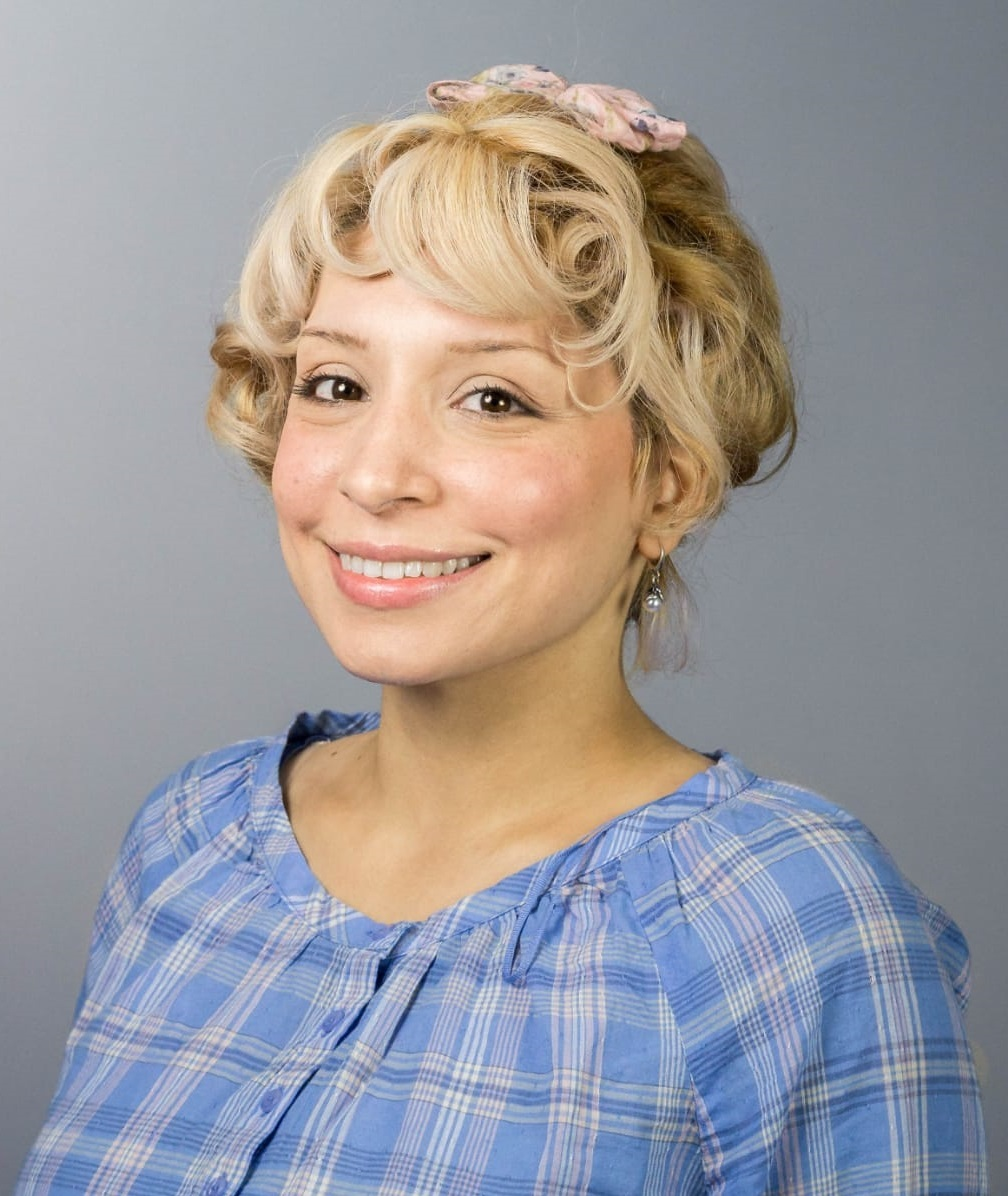
- Born: Worood Mahdi ورود مهدي; 1987 (age 38–39); Najaf, Iraq
- Other name: Nardeen
- Education: University of Karbala
- Occupations: Biologist; human rights activist
- Years active: 2010–present

Worood Zuhair (Arabic: ورود زهير) (born 1987) is an Iraqi women's rights activist, biologist, and author who lives in Germany. After being attacked by her father and brother, Zuhair became a candidate for refugee status in Germany. She campaigns for the rights of women, and is the author of the book Naked Revolution.

== Early life and education ==
Zuhair was born in Najaf. In 2010, she graduated with a bachelor's degree in biology from the University of Karbala in Biology. She relates that before graduating, she was a victim of domestic violence, when her father and her brother attacked her, causing her to lose consciousness and breaking her spine, because she left the house without permission and discussed her atheism.

== Activism in Germany ==
Zuhair migrated to Germany in 2016 after successfully arguing that the danger she faced from her family made her a candidate for refugee status; after arriving, she received death threats over her secular blog posts, and is under police protection.

After arriving in Germany, she started campaigns to demand the rights for women in the Middle East, organized and participated in protests for the cause and spoken with international media organizations and on social media in support of the campaigns for freedom and gender equality.

She has had many media interviews, given speeches and participated in international conferences, including the Richard Dawkins Foundation, where she discussed her personal life and advocated for greater freedom of speech and expression for Iraqis.

== Books ==
- Zuhair, Worood. Naked Revolution [ثورة التعري] (in Arabic). Germany.

Zuhair announced her first book by the name of Naked Revolution to be published in Arabic and later in English. She called the book "out of ordinary"; she announced it after her Naked Revolution campaign that demands women's freedom from the intellectual closed state of mind and liberates from body restrictions.

== See also ==
- Hanaa Edwar
- Rana Ahmad
- Rahaf Mohammed
- Tara Fares

== Sources ==
- Zuhair, Worood (January 22, 2019). The roots of Islam reach from the Middle East to Europe (Speech). RDF Talk at Richard Dawkins Foundation. Haus der Wissenschaft in Bremen.
- Zuhair, Worood (September 4, 2018). "They kill me in the name of honor, who protects me? (Arabic)". DW Arabia (Interview). Interviewed by Jaafar Abdul Karim. Germany.
