= Abdulrahman Akkad =

Syrian LGBTQ activist (born 1998)

- عبدالرحمن عقاد
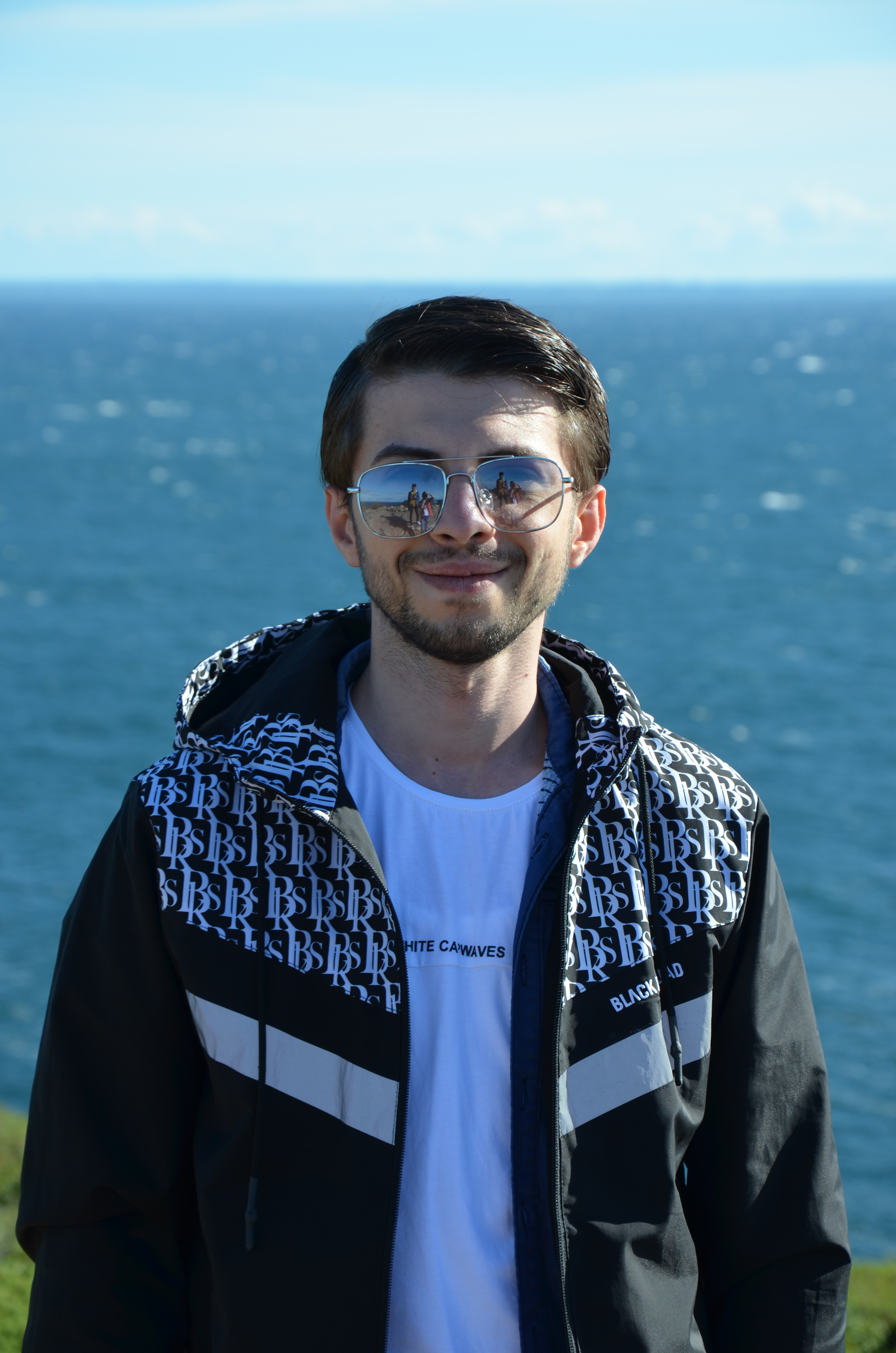
- Akkad in 2022
- Born: May 17, 1998 (age 28); Aleppo, Syria
- Occupations: Freelancer; public speaker; human rights activist; YouTuber; Political activist
- Years active: 2017–present
- Known for: LGBTQ and human rights activism

Abdulrahman Akkad (Arabic: عبدالرحمن عقاد; born May 17, 1998) also known as Owen Akkad is a Syrian- German political blogger, public speaker, and human rights activist. He currently resides in Berlin.

== Biography ==
=== Early life and education ===
Akkad was born in Aleppo to Syrian Muslim parents. His family is descended from Sephardic Jews who later converted to Islam. He has three brothers and a sister.

In 2010, Akkad graduated from Dhat Al-Sawari Primary with a primary degree. Three years later in 2013, just before leaving Syria, Akkad graduated from Abdulwahab Al-Shawaf Junior High with a middle school diploma. However, Akkad was unable to continue his education after leaving Syria in 2013.

With the escalation of events surrounding the Syrian civil war, Akkad and his family were forced to leave Syria in July 2013.

=== Time spent in Turkey ===
Akkad and his family migrated to Istanbul, Turkey in July 2013. He speaks Turkish fluently and worked as a translator in call center companies in the city. In the summer of 2015, Akkad's father travelled to Germany illegally, hoping to later bring the rest of the family with him through family reunification.

While living in Turkey, Akkad discovered his sexual orientation. He grew to hate himself and attempted suicide several times. He went to a psychological counselor who provided him with support and helped him accept himself. He tried to obtain a humanitarian visa from the Swiss Consulate in Istanbul but was refused.

Eventually, Akkad decided to tell his family about his sexual orientation, believing that they would accept and love him as he is. However, his family said he was sick and in need of treatment. They took him to a doctor in Turkey who conducted an anal examination, sexually harassed him, and wrote him a prescription for testosterone. Akkad took several doses of the hormone but later refused to take more because it caused him depression and tension. His older brother beat and locked him up in a room for two months where he did not see sunlight. His cousins and sister's husband abused him and threatened him with death. Akkad later managed to convince them that he was no longer gay, later running away to a friend's house with his passport and $200.

=== Asylum in Europe ===
Akkad's friend suggested that he travel to Europe because the Turkish authorities would not protect him from abuse by his family, who are influential in Turkey. He traveled illegally by sea to Greece at the end of November 2015. His friend covered his travel costs. Akkad travelled through Macedonia, Serbia, Croatia, Slovenia, and Austria until he arrived in Germany on December 5, 2015, where he applied for asylum based on his sexual orientation. He was granted asylum in 2016, though his asylum procedure was delayed because he was a minor at the time.

Akkad was bullied, insulted, and threatened with death by Arabs and Muslims in Germany.

== Coming out ==
In 2017, before Akkad came out, he agreed to be engaged to a girl from the family because of the pressure his family had put on him. His mother told him that his sexual orientation would change after he married. Within a few months, the matter became serious and the wedding was to be held in Istanbul. In the end, he decided to post a live video on Facebook, in which he announced his sexual orientation. The video was directed to his family only, but the video was withdrawn and published on many Arab pages and groups. The video garnered hundreds of thousands of views within a week.

On July 24, 2017, Akkad streamed a live video on Facebook, coming out as gay after fearing that his family would have forced him to marry a woman against his will. The video was shared on various Arab social channels. It was possibly the first ever occurrence of a gay Syrian man publicly expressing his sexual orientation in a video with his real name and face.

On July 24, 2020, Akkad shared a picture of him with his family, officially announcing their acceptance of his sexual orientation and that they love him unconditionally, also declaring victory over customs, traditions and society. This photo is also considered to be the first of its kind with an Arab family publicly accepting their gay son's sexual orientation.

== Activism in Germany ==
Akkad is an openly gay activist in the MENA region, especially in Syria, and the German media described him as a "hated figure" in the Arab world.

In subsequent years, Akkad has given many interviews to several media, primarily German and Arabic ones, about his experiences and his political opinions, especially on the situation of homosexuality and LGBTQ rights in the Middle East. Akkad gave his first interview to the famous German Newspaper (Bild) in Germany and said that he doesn't want to stay in Germany because of the threats he received.

Akkad participated in the Me Too movement and admitted that he was sexually harassed and encouraged people to participate in the campaign and speak out.

Akkad worked with Atheist Refugee Relief Organization in Germany and helped many refugees and appeared with them at the Cologne Pride in 2019 wearing the Niqab to support women who are forced to wear it in Saudi Arabia and in the Middle East.

Akkad posted a video wearing the Rainbow flag in front of a mosque in Germany in the Gay pride in 2020, in solidarity with homosexuals in the Middle East and Islamic countries, where homosexuality is illegal and punishable by death.

== Political views ==
Akkad identifies as secular, supporting the principle of separation of the state from religious institutions. As a former member of the Atheist Refugee Relief organization, Akkad aided many Atheist & LGBTQ+ Middle Eastern refugees in Germany.

Akkad's story was mentioned during the federal government session of the Federal parliament of Germany for Human Rights in 2020 by German philosopher David Berger after Instagram banned his account because he was gay and the threats he was exposed to.

Abdulrahman and his family have also been strong opponents of the Syrian regime, especially after Akkad's sister-in-law was shot and killed by a regime sniper in 2012, leading his brother to dissent from the army, and forcing his entire family to flee the country after severe pressure imposed by al-Assad's authorities.

He encouraged the deportation of refugees who did not integrate into German society and did not respect the law and the constitution. He supported the German government's decision to deport Syrian refugees who committed crimes to Syria and encouraged the deportation of supporters of the Syrian regime.

Akkad criticized the German government's policy in dealing with refugee and integration laws, and said that he was tired of neglecting the German police for not knowing how to deal with the threats he received from Arabs in Germany and Europe.

== Reception ==
There has been a long history of oppression and discrimination against the LGBTQ community in the Arab world through censorship, hate speech, and government-coordinated persecution. Akkad's story has been met with some supportive, but mostly homophobic responses through media coverage and public discourse. Akkad even started receiving death threats after coming out.

== See also ==
- LGBT rights in Syria
- LGBT rights in the Middle East
- LGBT in Islam
