= LGBTQ rights in Syria =

- Syria proper shown in dark green; Syria's territorial claims over the Israeli-occupied Golan Heights shown in light green.
- Legal status: Illegal since 1949
- Penalty: Up to 3 years imprisonment
- Gender identity: No
- Military: No
- Discrimination protections: None

Family rights
- Recognition of relationships: No recognition of same-sex unions
- Adoption: No

Lesbian, gay, bisexual, transgender and queer (LGBTQ) people in Syria face serious legal challenges which are not experienced by non-LGBTQ residents. Article 520 of the penal code of 1949 prohibits "carnal relations against the order of nature," punishable with a prison sentence of up to three years. Beatings and torture against LGBTQ people occur frequently in Syria, including attacks by the rebel group Hay'at Tahrir al-Sham and the Islamic State.

Mahmoud Hassino, a gay Syrian activist and journalist who created the online magazine Mawaleh, notes that regardless of the outcome of the civil war, work needs to be done in the area of civil rights on behalf of all Syrians, not just the LGBTQ community. Miral Bioredda, a secular leader of the Local Coordination Committees of Syria, said, "Personally I see homosexuality as a private matter. But Syrian society would say 'no way' if gays rose to claim their rights. Developing a civil society will take time." Nasradeen Ahme, a member of the Free Syrian Army which strived to topple the government of Bashar al-Assad, said "If I was in charge I would enforce tougher laws against homosexuals. If someone said homosexuals should be stoned to death as in Iran and Saudi Arabia, I would not object."

== History ==
=== 2010: Political interference ===
In 2010, the Syrian police began a crackdown that led to the arrest of over 25 men. The men were charged with various crimes including homosexual acts, illegal drug use, encouraging homosexual behavior and organizing obscene parties.

=== 2011: Social movements and virtual organising ===
After 2011, the LGBTQ community in Syria started to demand rights more openly, and campaigns outside of Syria began to spread awareness about LGBTQ rights. These campaigns were influenced by the growing number of Syrian immigrants and refugees who found more opportunities to speak out.

Many LGBTQ Syrian refugees have participated in gay pride parades around the world.

=== 2015: International concerns ===
In August 2015, the UN Security Council held a session on LGBTQ rights co-sponsored by the U.S. and Chile. The council heard testimony from refugees fleeing Syria and Iraq. In ISIS-held areas, the refugees reported increased violence against women and members of the LGBTQ community. They reported that ISIS had claimed to have executed at least 30 people for "sodomy". This was the first time in its 70-year history that the UN Security Council had discussed LGBTQ concerns.

=== 2021: Guardians of Equality Movement ===
On 14 September 2021, Syrian LGBTQIA+ activists launched the Guardians of Equality Movement-(GEM), an organization that works to defend and protect the rights of the Syrian LGBTQIA+ community.

== LGBTQ life in Syria ==
=== Culture ===
In 1971, Syrian poet Nizar Qabbani wrote "The Evil Poem", in which he described a sexual relationship between two women.

Before 2011, a gay tour was organized by a man named Bertho. It was the first and the only gay tour in the Middle East, with main destinations including Damascus and Aleppo. "And it was the best destination ever", he says. "We’d go on tours of the hammams in Aleppo, and in Damascus it was a paradise for gay people. We never had any problems, never ever". The tour passed through Lebanon, Syria, and Jordan. Since the beginning of the civil war, the tour stopped its activities in Syria.

Furthermore, areas of Damascus that were previously underground LGBTQ hubs, and were practically the only places in Syria where an underground LGBTQ scene could even exist, have been eradicated since the start of the civil war and most cultural pursuits have stopped.

=== LGBTQ movies and series ===
On 19 October 2017, Mr. Gay Syria was released. Written and directed by Ayşe Toprak, the movie follows two gay Syrian refugees who are trying to rebuild their lives.

A Lesbian Tale, a short movie, was filmed in Syria. It was published by Maxim Diab on 16 January 2014.

=== HIV/AIDS issues ===
The first reported cases of HIV infection were in 1987.

In 2005, the Deputy Minister of Religious Endowments publicly stated that HIV/AIDS was divine punishment for people who engaged in fornication and homosexuality. That same year, the Health Ministry stated that only 369 people in Syria were infected with HIV and that the government offers such people "up-to-date medicines to combat this disease freely". However, Non-governmental organizations estimate that there are actually at least five times as many, and the United Nations chastised the government for its ineffective prevention methods.

Beyond tolerating the work of some NGOs, the government has established voluntary clinics that can test for HIV/AIDS and distribute some educational pamphlets, but comprehensive public education, especially for LGBTQ people, does not exist.

Instead, the government launched a limited HIV/AIDS educational program for youth in secondary schooling. The country is considered to have one of the lowest prevalences of HIV infection in the Region, with less than 2 per 100,000 among the general population affected and less than 1% among the most at-risk populations in 2018. The total number of total reported HIV cases until the end of the third quarter of 2019 was 1013.

=== Political support ===
As part of the Rights in Exile Programme, the International Refugee Rights Initiative has compiled a resource page for LGBTI citizens of the Syrian Arab Republic.

== "One of you" movement ==
"One of you" (Arabic: واحد منكن, romanized: wahid minkun), was a social media movement that started on Facebook in 2020, then moved to Twitter for easier recognition. It launched around March in Syria, and later spread within the wider Arab community. The campaign continued for a month afterwards, but the trend soon died due to other major events, primarily the COVID-19 pandemic.

It started with university students painting the LGBTQ flag colors on their fingers, with the hashtag #oneofyou on their hands. They then took pictures with a faculty building while raising their hands, and posted it from various accounts. Most people who started the trend used fake social media accounts to post the pictures, out of fear of being recognized.

Reactions varied, from people defending the trend, to others promising blood, to people who participated afterwards.

No incidents happened while the trend was ongoing, no casualties, just online discussions. Some escalated into heated arguments, but nothing happened as the trend died.

== In the Diaspora ==
Syrian LGBTQ+ refugees, like refugees of other nationalities, often face discrimination and exclusion in their host countries based on factors such as race, language, skin color and religious background.

=== Abdulrahman Akkad Story ===
In July 2017, a Syrian young man residing in Germany named Abdulrahman Akkad published a live video on Facebook, in which he announced his sexual orientation and that his family was pressuring him to marry against his will. Akkad's story was mentioned in the human rights session in the German Parliament in 2020 by the German politician David Berger.

== Summary table ==
Right	Legal status
Same-sex sexual activity	No Illegal since 1949 (Penalty: Up to 3 years imprisonment)
Equal age of consent	No
Anti-discrimination laws	No
Same-sex marriage	No
Recognition of same-sex couples	No
Stepchild adoption by same-sex couples	No
Joint adoption by same-sex couples	No
LGBTQ people allowed to serve openly in the military	No
Right to change legal gender	No
Access to IVF for lesbians	No
Commercial surrogacy for gay male couples	No
MSMs allowed to donate blood	No

== Notable people ==
Notable LGBTQ figures of Syrian descent

- Antony Grey, English LGBTQ activist with Syrian roots on his maternal side
- Wentworth Miller, American actor with Syrian roots on his maternal side
- James Defyus, British actor with Syrian roots on his maternal side
- Simone Fattal, Syrian American poet
- Jwan Yosef, Swedish painter and former husband of Ricky Martin
- Raúl Gómez Jattin, Colombian poet of Syrian descent
- Danny Ramadan, novelist, public speaker, and activist
- David Adjmi, American playwright
- Abdulrahman Akkad, activist

== See also ==
- Human rights in Syria
- LGBTQ rights in the Middle East
- LGBTQ rights in Asia
