= The Medieval History Journal =

- Discipline: Medieval History
- Language: English
- Edited by: Harbans Mukhia, Monica Juneja, Rajat Datta, Thomas Ertl

Publication details
- History: Apr 1998
- Publisher: SAGE Publications
- Frequency: Bi-annually

Standard abbreviations
- ISO 4: Mediev. Hist. J.

Indexing
- ISSN: 0971-9458 (print); 0973-0753 (web)

Links
- Journal homepage; Online access; Online archive

The Medieval History Journal is a peer-reviewed academic journal that aims to encompass the medieval world in scope.

The journal is published by SAGE Publications, India in association with the Medieval History Society and provides a space for comparative and transcultural conversations.

The journal is a member of the Committee on Publication Ethics (COPE).

== Abstracting and indexing ==
The Medieval History Journal is abstracted and indexed in:

- ProQuest: International Bibliography of the Social Sciences (IBSS)
- SCOPUS
- DeepDyve
- Portico
- Dutch-KB
- EBSCO
- OCLC
- Ohio
- Thomson Reuters: Arts & Humanities Citation Index
- J-Gate
