= Society for Peace Studies and Practice =

Nigerian non-profit organisation

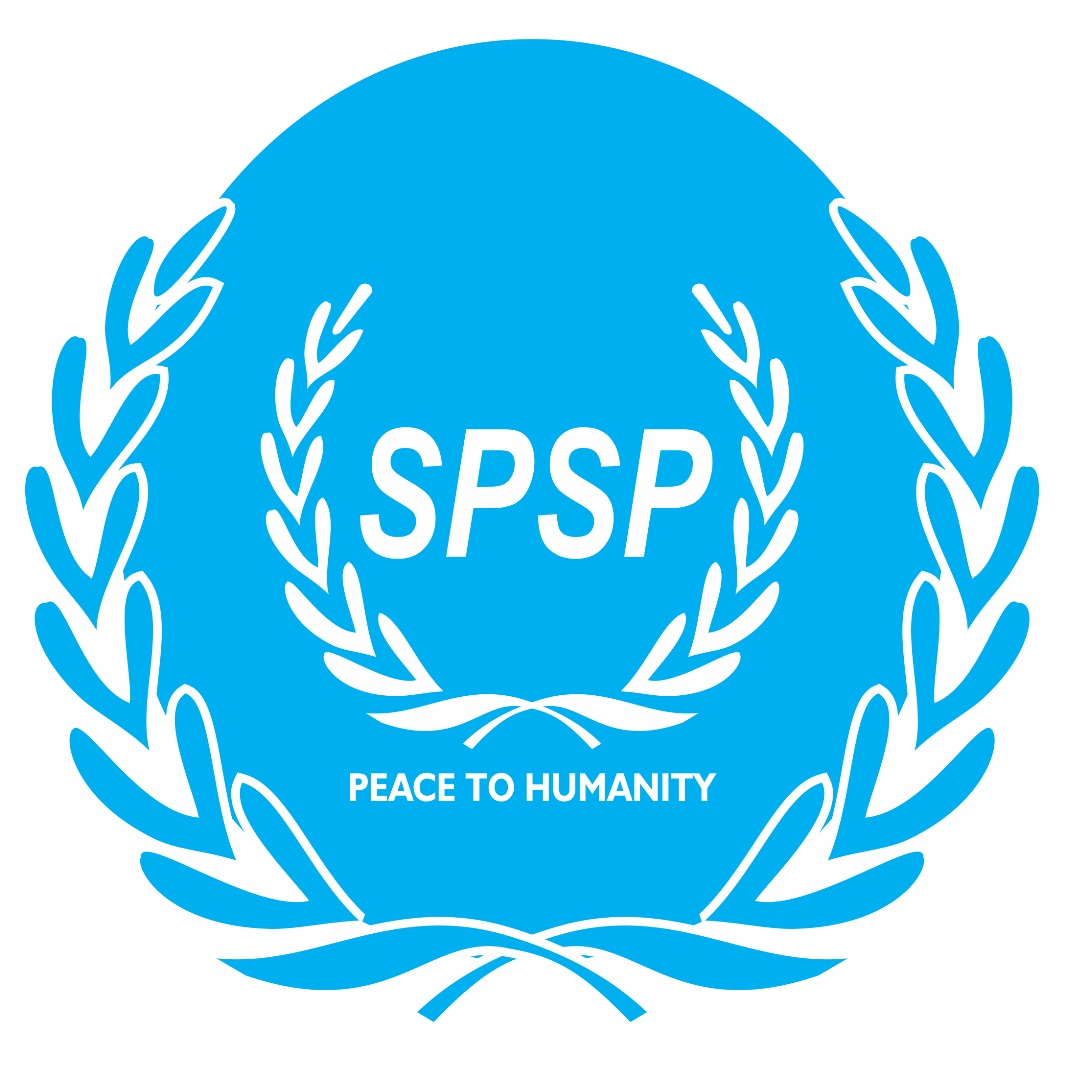
- Abbreviation: SPSP
- Formation: 2000
- Founder: Prof. Isaac Olawale Albert
- Type: Non-profit professional society
- Headquarters: University of Ibadan, Oyo State, Nigeria
- Region served: Africa
- Members: Academics, practitioners, security agencies, civil society
- Affiliations: International Peace Bureau
- Website: https://www.spsp.org.ng

The Society for Peace Studies and Practice (SPSP) is a Nigerian non-profit professional organisation established in 2000 at the University of Ibadan. It focuses on research, policy engagement, and professional activities related to peacebuilding, security studies, and conflict resolution in Africa.

== History ==
The Society for Peace Studies and Practice (SPSP) was founded in 2000 at the University of Ibadan by Isaac Olawale Albert, one of Nigeria's early scholars in peace and conflict studies. The organisation initially drew on the university's Peace and Conflict Studies programme to link academic research with practical approaches to conflict management and peacebuilding.

== Mission and objectives ==
The organisation is focused on advancing peace research and education, with an emphasis on developing competencies for non-violent conflict resolution. Its primary objectives include promoting the study of peace and conflict, creating platforms for dialogue among scholars and practitioners, and strengthening cooperation among Nigerian universities, government institutions, and civil society organisations.

== Programmes and activities ==
Each year, SPSP convenes practitioners and researchers through conferences, seminars, and professional development programmes. The organisation has also worked with national security institutions to support capacity-building in security management and peacebuilding.

In September 2025, the Society for Peace Studies and Practice (SPSP) collaborated with the Nigeria Police Force to organise a workshop titled "Managing Fast-Paced Security Challenges in a Protracted Conflict Environment." The programme was attended by nearly 200 senior officers, including Deputy Inspectors General, Assistant Inspectors General, and Commissioners of Police.

In 2024, the Society for Peace Studies and Practice (SPSP) held its 18th Annual Conference at the Nigerian Defence Academy, with the theme "Community Engagement: Networking Kinetic and Non-Kinetic Capabilities for Tackling Insecurity in Africa."

== Publications ==
SPSP publishes the Journal of Peace Studies and Practice (JPSP), a peer-reviewed journal that includes research articles, policy analyses, and case studies related to peacebuilding and security. SPSP has also produced policy briefs, monographs, and festschrifts, including Essays in Honour of Basorun Seinde Arogbofa (2019).

== Membership and structure ==
Membership is open to individuals and institutions with an interest in peace and security. The Society recognises five categories of membership: Associate, Full, Honorary, Fellow, and Student. Fellowship is reserved for individuals acknowledged for significant professional contributions to the field. SPSP operates both national and international chapters, including branches in Sierra Leone and Cameroon. It also collaborates with several universities, such as the University of Portsmouth in the United Kingdom, the University of The Gambia, and the Adventist University of Rwanda.

== Recognition ==
SPSP is a registered member of the International Peace Bureau (IPB), and has been covered in Nigerian national media for its involvement in policy discussions and initiatives related to security reforms.
