= Atheist Refugee Relief =

German non-governmental organisation

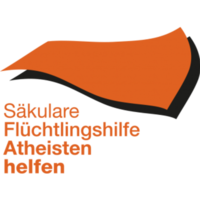

Atheist Refugee Relief (German: Säkulare Flüchtlingshilfe e. V.) is a non-governmental organisation founded in Cologne, Germany, in 2017 in defence of the human rights of apostates and nonreligious people. The board consists of Rana Ahmad, Mahmudul Haque Munshi and Stefan Paintner. Further groups and associations were formed in Munich (2019), Austria (2019), Hamburg (2019), Stuttgart (2020) and Switzerland (2020).

== Organization ==
=== Founding in 2017 ===
Atheist Refugee Relief reports that the personal story of Rana Ahmad's flight from Saudi Arabia to Germany in 2015 has been the inspiration to form the relief organization and the wider support network. The Giordano Bruno Foundation provided 10,000 euros in seed funding. In November 2017, Atheist Refugee Relief was presented to the public on the occasion of the 10th anniversary of the Central Council of Ex-Muslims in Cologne.

=== Board ===
In 2020, the board of directors consists of Rana Ahmad, Mahmudul Haque Munshi, and Stefan Paintner.

=== Members and supporters ===
The following refugees and activists spoke about their case in public, listed by country of origin:

- Bangladesh: Mahmudul Haque Munshi
- Iraq: Amed Sherwan, Worood Zuhair
- Iran: Mina Ahadi, Mohamad Hosein Tavasolli, Farid Mahnad, Sina Nasiri
- Mauritania: Yahya Ekhou
- Pakistan: Muhammad Ajeef, Alia Khannum
- Saudi Arabia: Rana Ahmad, Loujain Sultan
- Syria: Abdulrahman Akkad
- Egypt: Hisham Nofal

The organisation has been endorsed by Hamed Abdel-Samad, Lale Akgün, Richard Dawkins and Michael Schmidt-Salomon.

== Activities ==
=== Practical help ===
In Germany, the organisation offers practical help to refugees in their contacts with authorities, doctors and lawyers. It helps them find access to suitable language and integration courses, or physiological and psychological therapy after human rights violations. The organisation is in regular contact with politicians and state authorities. In the atheists' countries of origin, the organisation provides emergency humanitarian aid in acute crises for individuals and groups.

=== Information about countries of origin ===
The organisation states that in 13 countries worldwide (Afghanistan, Iran, Yemen, Malaysia, Maldives, Mauritania, Nigeria, Qatar, Pakistan, Saudi Arabia, Somalia, Sudan and the United Arab Emirates) the human right to freedom of religion and belief is punishable by death on charges of apostasy or blasphemy. Moreover, prison sentences can be imposed in more than 40 countries.

=== Official perspectives ===
From the German government, several statements concerning Atheist Refugee Relief have been made and have been posted on the organisation's website, including Bärbel Kofler, Representative of the Federal Government for Human Rights Policy and Humanitarian Aid at the Federal Foreign Office; Michael Blume, Representative of the State Government of Baden-Württemberg against Anti-Semitism; Serap Güler, State Secretary at the Ministry for Children, Family, Refugees and Integration of the State of North Rhine-Westphalia and Doris Schröder-Köpf, State Commissioner for Migration and Participation of the State of Lower Saxony.

== See also ==
- Abdulrahman Akkad
- Giordano Bruno Foundation
- Rana Ahmad
- Worood Zuhair
- 2024 Magdeburg car attack
