= Achin Vanaik =

Indian political scientist, author, and activist

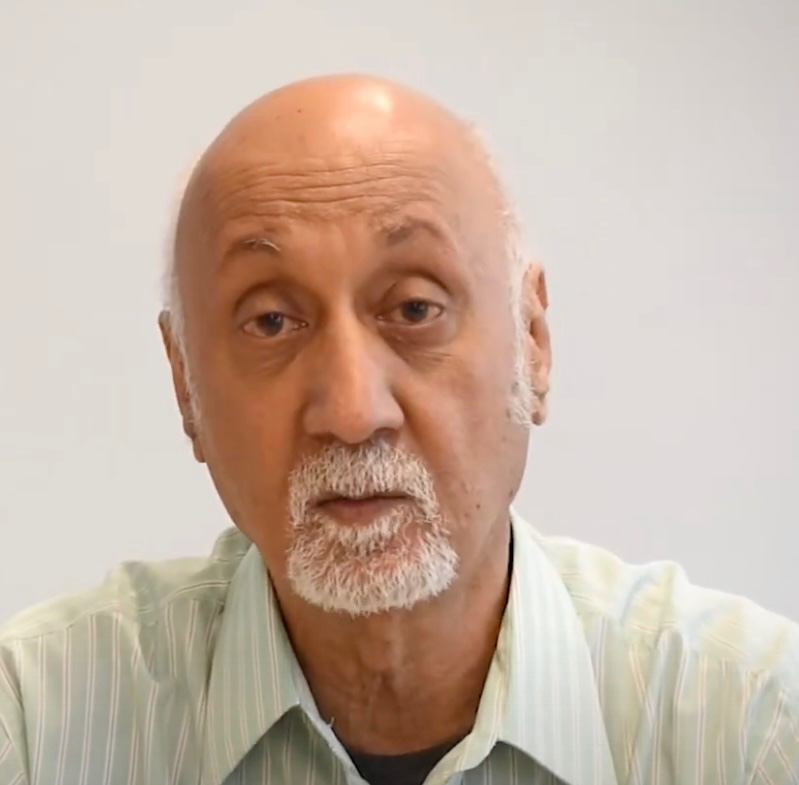
- Born: 1947 (age 78–79); India
- Education: University of Bristol
- Occupations: Political scientist, author, activist
- Notable work: The Furies of Indian Communalism: Religion, Modernity and Secularization (1997)
- Awards: Sean MacBride Peace Prize

Achin Vanaik (born 1947) is an Indian political scientist, author, and activist.

== Early life and education ==
Vanaik was born in India in 1947. He lived in various places throughout his childhood including China, Ghana, and the United States because his father was a diplomat. In 1964, he moved to the United Kingdom to attend school in Suffolk. Bullied for wearing a turban, he eventually stopped wearing one. He worked at a Corona factory and the post office in Suffolk and later as a bus conductor in London. After completing a degree in economics and statistics at the University of Bristol in 1970, he briefly worked at an accounting firm but did not like it and found a job as a croupier.

While living in the UK, Vanaik became involved in leftism, including anti-colonial, anti-racist, and Black power politics, reading books by James Baldwin, Stokely Carmichael, Frantz Fanon, and Aimé Césaire. According to Vanaik, most of his friends were West Indian, and he did not know many white people. Between 1971 and 1974, he taught at the Free University of Black Studies, which provided political education to the immigrant community. Around the time of the state of emergency instituted by Indira Gandhi, he returned to India, where he was involved in labor organizing.

== Career ==
Vanaik served as an editor at The Times of India between 1978 and 1990. In 1996, Vanaik began his academic career as a visiting professor in Third World Studies at Jamia Milia Islamia University. In 2002, he began working at Delhi University, eventually serving as the head of the Political Science Department and Dean of Social Sciences between 2007 and 2010. Since 1998, he has been a fellow of the Transnational Institute in Amsterdam. In addition to authoring multiple books, Vanaik has written for The Wire and Jacobin.

=== Nuclear disarmament ===
In response to Indian nuclear tests, Vanaik, Praful Bidwai, Laxminarayan Ramdas, and others founded the Coalition for Nuclear Disarmament and Peace (CNDP) in 2000. Bidwai and Vanaik also wrote New Nukes: India, Pakistan, and Global Nuclear Disarmament (2000). That year, Bidwai and Vanaik were awarded the Sean MacBride Peace Prize for their advocacy against nuclear weapons. In 2015, Vanaik published After The Bomb, a collection of essays criticizing the Indian nuclear program and proposing steps to limit nuclear weapons.

=== Hindu nationalism ===
In a 1994 paper, Vanaik argued that Hindutva is not fascist and that labelling it as such could "disorient the organization of opposition". However, he stated that it has the potential for fascism. Rustom Bharucha criticized his argument as underestimating the fascism present in Hindutva. Shortly before the Bharatiya Janata Party (BJP) took power in the 1998 general election, Vanaik published The Furies of Indian Communalism: Religion, Modernity and Secularization (1997). In this book, Vanaik details the rise of Hindu nationalism and proposes an alternative political movement that he says can gain power by bettering the lives of Indians. Vijay Prashad referred to the book as "compulsory reading for anyone interested in recent political developments in India." Ten years later, The Furies of Indian Communalism was expanded and re-published as The Rise of Hindu Authoritarianism: Secular Claims, Communal Realities. In his 2020 book, Nationalist Dangers, Secular Failings: A Compass for an Indian Left, Vanaik argues that the only way to reduce Hindutva's power is to create a "new, much more radical Left force".

=== India-Israel relations ===
Vanaik has argued that India's relations with Israel has always been based on realpolitik, noting that India purchased weapons from Israel in the 1960s despite its public pro-Palestine stance at the time. Vanaik has also written about the BJP's strengthening of relations with Israel, arguing that Hindutva and Zionism are similar and that BJP leaders admire Israel.

At the beginning of the Gaza war, Vanaik gave a lecture at OP Jindal Global University, in which he compared Hindutva to Zionism and called Hindutva "anti-Muslim". Additionally, he critiqued how the label terrorism is applied and stated that suicide bombers are more interested in dying than killing. Afterwards, the university registrar condemned his comments about Hindutva and suicide bombers, while the Israeli ambassador condemned his comments about Israel. IIT-Bombay cancelled a lecture he was scheduled to give. Vanaik reaffirmed his statements but clarified that he does not support terrorism. A statement denouncing the Israeli embassy's "interference with academic freedom on Indian campuses" was signed by 470 Indian academics.

== Books ==
- The Furies of Indian Communalism: Religion, Modernity and Secularization (Verso, 1997)
- New Nukes: India, Pakistan, and Global Nuclear Disarmament, with Praful Bidwai. (Olive Branch Press, 2000)
- After The Bomb: Post-Pokharan II Essays (Orient Black Swan, 2015)
- The Rise of Hindu Authoritarianism: Secular Claims, Communal Realities (Verso, 2017)
- Nationalist Dangers, Secular Failings: A Compass for an Indian Left (Aakar Books, 2020)
