= Harbans Mukhia =

Indian historian (born 1939)

- Occupation: Historian

Academic background
- Education: Kirori Mal College Delhi University

Academic work
- Discipline: History
- Sub-discipline: Medieval Indian History
- Institutions: Jawaharlal Nehru University

Harbans Mukhia (born 1939) is an Indian political historian whose principal area of study is medieval India.

== Biography ==
He received his Bachelors in Arts (BA) in history in 1958 from Kirori Mal College, Delhi University and then earned his doctorate from Department of History, Delhi University in 1969. Mukhia worked at Jawaharlal Nehru University (JNU), New Delhi as Professor of Medieval History at the Centre for Historical Studies. He was rector of JNU from 1999 to 2002 and retired in February 2004..

== Honors and awards ==
- Fellowship of the Indian Institute of Advanced Study, Simla (1971)
- Homi Bhabha Fellowship (1979–1981)
- Directeur d’Étude Associé, EHESS, Paris, 1980-2003 (a month every year)1980-2003.
- UGC National Lecturer (1985–1986)
- UGC National Fellow (1991–1993)
- Visiting Professor, The British Academy, London, February–March, 1993.
- Senior Visiting Fellow, International Institute for Asian Studies, Leiden (1997)
- Fellow, IDPAD, University of Amsterdam, October 2004.
- National Fellow, Indian Council of Historical Research, 2014-16.

== Books ==
As author

- The Mughals of India (Peoples of Asia) ISBN 978-0-631-18555-0
- Perspectives on Medieval History ISBN 978-0-7069-6387-8
- Historians and Historiography During the Reign of Akbar ISBN 978-0-7069-0444-4
- Issues in Indian History, Politics and Society ISBN 978-93-5002-010-4
- Exploring India’s Medieval Centuries: Essays in History, Society, Culture and Technology ISBN 978-93-5002-047-0

As editor

- Feudalism and Non-European Socieites (Special issue of the Journal of Peasant Studies, 12) T. J. Byres, Harbans Mukhia (Editor) ASIN B0017DM8SQ
- Religion, Religiosity, and Communalism; Praful Bidwai, Harbans Mukhia, and Achin Vanaik ASIN B001NJD892
- French Studies in History: The Inheritance Harbans Mukhia, Maurice Aymard (Editor) ISBN 978-0-86131-892-6
- The Feudalism Debate ISBN 978-81-7304-284-3
- French Studies in History: The Departures ISBN 978-0-86311-088-7
- Understanding India: Indology and Beyond, Harbans Mukhia, Jaroslav Vacek, Prague, 2012. ISBN 978-80-246-2031-2
- The History of Technology in India, vol II, Medieval India, New Delhi, 2012.

Festschriften

- Rethinking a Millennium: Essays for Harbans Mukhia: perspectives on Indian history from the 8th to the 18th century (Hardcover); editor Rajat Dutta ISBN 978-81-89833-36-7
