= Mahmudul Haque Munshi =

Bangladeshi blogger and human rights activist

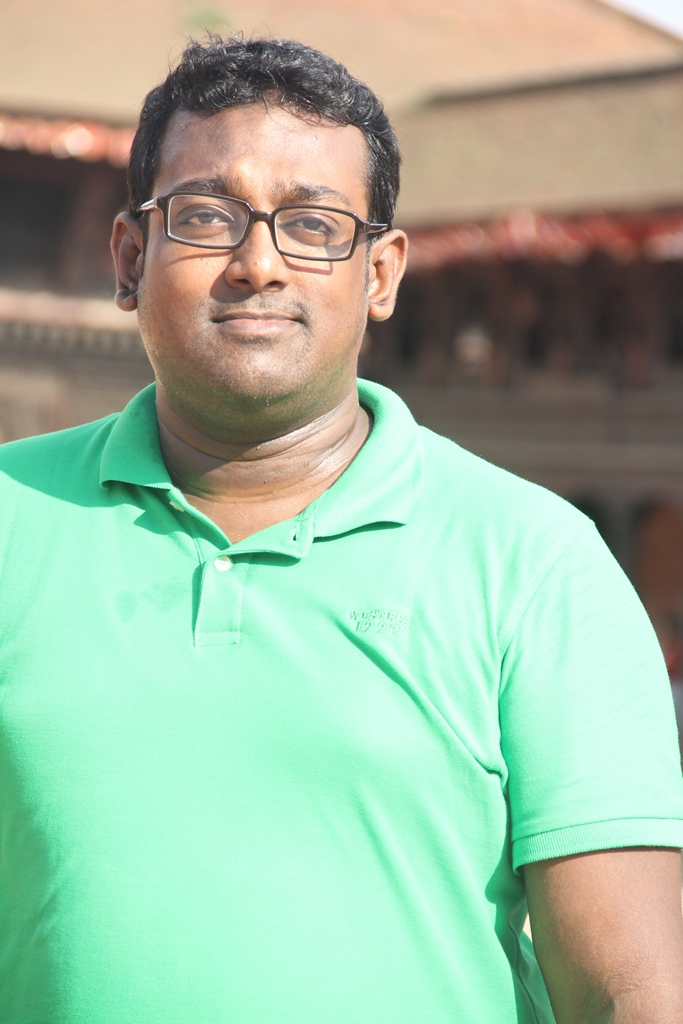
Mahmudul Haque Munshi in exile in Nepal

Mahmudul Haque Munshi (born 1987) is a Bangladeshi blogger in exile, atheism and human rights activist. After getting asylum, he moved to Germany. He is a board member of the Atheist Refugee Relief. He writes on his own blog, Swapnokothok.

== Early life ==
Munshi was born in 1987 in Jessore District, Bangladesh.

== Career ==
Munshi was one of the activists of the 2013 Shahbag protests and Gonojagoran Mancha. He was a member of the Bloggers and Online Activist Network. In May 2015, after Abdullahil Amaan Azmi, son of convicted war criminal Ghulam Azam, questioned the number of dead Indian soldiers in the Bangladesh Liberation War, Munshi said "It is our misfortune that the son of a Razakar should be teaching us the history of the Liberation War even 43 years after independence!". Ansarullah Bangla Team issued a list of death threat in June included him.

According to the Frankfurter Allgemeine Zeitung (FAZ), the Bangladeshi government did not protect bloggers and activists but instead accused them of blasphemy. During this time, Munshi received support from Reporters Without Borders, the Heinrich Böll Foundation, the Center for Inquiry, and Amnesty International. His name appeared on a "Global Hit List", which included exiled Bangladeshis targeted for assassination. Deutsche Welle quoted him in an article titled "Atheism is Life-Threatening", where he stated: "Recently, I received 4,500 death threats on my Facebook page in a single day."

In autumn 2015, Munshi and his wife—who previously worked for Terre des Hommes in Bangladesh—arrived in Germany. In an interview with The Times of India, he stated that although he was on an Islamist assassination list and had to leave Bangladesh, he would never remain silent, as doing so would mean victory for fundamentalists.

In Germany, Munshi has spoken about human rights, freedom of speech, and Islam at panel discussions, Re:publica, Deutsche Welle, Materialien und Informationen zur Zeit (MIZ), StadtRevue, and Aethervox Ehrenfeld Podcast. He also has a personal interest in poetry.

In May 2020, Munshi was elected to the board of Atheist Refugee Relief. He stated that it was in Germany's long-term interest to take a stand against countries like Bangladesh and Mauritania, where strong religious oppression forces people like him to flee. He warned that Germany should not empower religious fundamentalists, who aim to abolish democracy and impose Sharia law, but instead support secular democrats advocating for freedom of expression and universal human rights.

== See also ==
- Attacks on Secularists and Religious Minorities in Bangladesh
