= Maj Britt Theorin =

Swedish politician and diplomat (1932–2021)

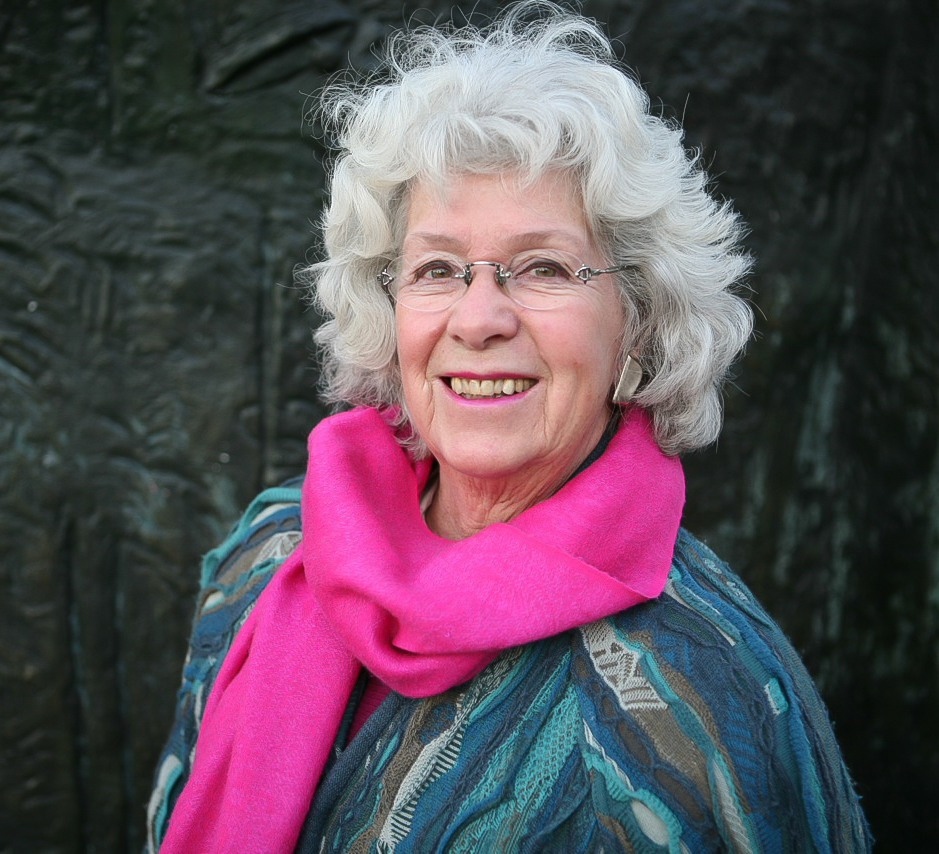
Maj Britt Theorin in 2016.

Theorin presenting herself at the Gothenburg bookfair in 2012.

Karin Maj Britt Margareta Theorin (22 December 1932 – 6 April 2021) was a Swedish social democratic politician and diplomat. She served as a member of the Parliament of Sweden from 1971 to 1995, and as a Member of the European Parliament from 1995 to 2004 and president of the Committee of Women's Rights and Equality in EP and a member of the Committee of Foreign Affairs and Security in EP and a member of the board from EP of ACP; African Caribbean Pacific.

Theorin was Swedish Ambassador for Disarmament in charge of Swedish disarmament policy (1982–1991). Theorin was chairperson of the UN Commission of Experts on Nuclear Weapons (1989–90), chairperson of the UN Study on Military and the Environment (1990–91), chairperson of the UN Expert Group on Women and the Agenda for Peace (1994) and member of the Canberra Commission on the Elimination of Nuclear Weapons (1995–96). Theorin was former President of the International Peace Bureau and of Parliamentarians for Global Action. Theorin was president of the umbrella union of six women's and peace leagues Operation 1325 in Sweden and member of the board of UN Women Sweden. She served as president of the International Peace Bureau from 1992 to 2000, following Bruce Kent.

She was born in Gothenburg.
