= International Peace Bureau =

International organization devoted to peacekeeping

- Abbreviation: IPB
- Formation: 13 November 1891; 135 years ago
- Type: NGO
- Legal status: Nonprofit
- Purpose: Peace activism
- Headquarters: Berlin, Germany
- Coordinates: 52.522454°N 13.383641°E
- Region served: Worldwide
- Methods: Seminars and Conferences, Education, Advocation
- Fields: World peace
- Co-president: Corazon Valdez Fabros
- Co-president: Philip Jennings
- Main organ: Assembly of the International Peace Bureau
- Award: 1910 Nobel Peace Prize
- Website: ipb.org

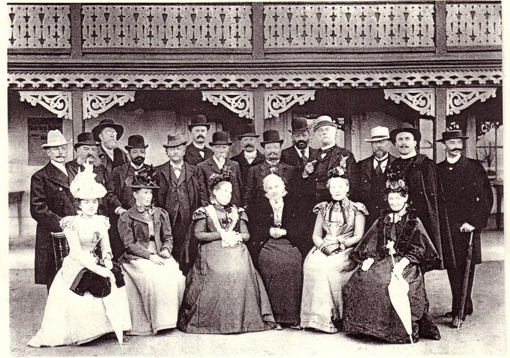
International Peace Bureau (IPB) council meeting at Bern, 1899

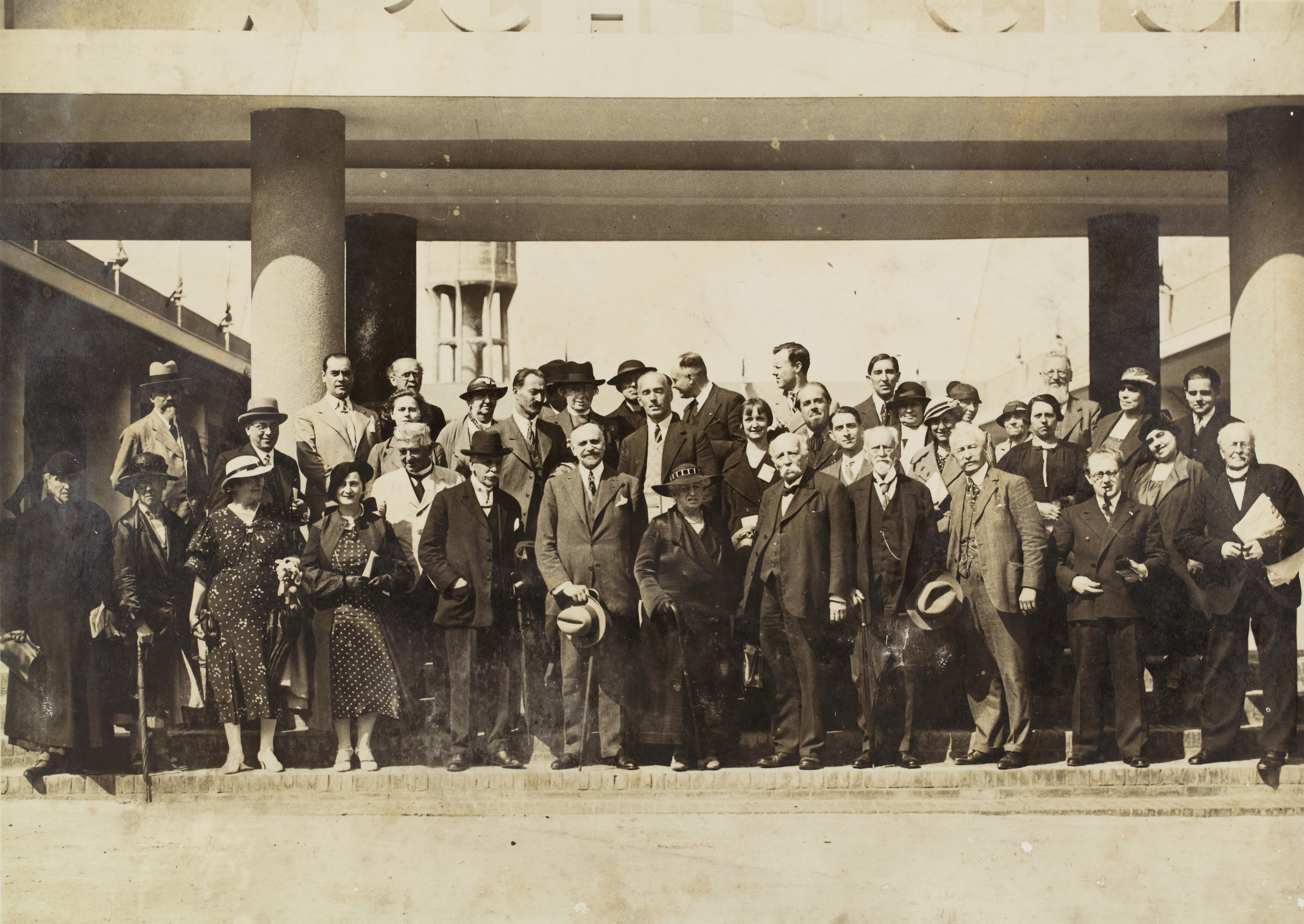
General Assembly of the International Peace Bureau, September 1935.

The International Peace Bureau (IPB; French: Bureau international de la paix), founded in 1891, is one of the world's oldest international peace federations. The organisation was awarded the Nobel Peace Prize in 1910 for acting "as a link between the peace societies of the various countries". In 1913, Henri La Fontaine was also awarded the Prize "[For his work as] head of the International Peace Bureau". As of 2012, eleven other Nobel Peace Prize laureates have been members of the IPB.

Its membership consists of 300 organizations in 70 countries. IPB's headquarters are located in Berlin, Germany, with offices in Barcelona, Spain, and Geneva, Switzerland. Prior to 2017, the headquarters were in Geneva.

Its main programmes are the Global Campaign on Military Spending (GCOMS) and disarmament for sustainable development, which focuses both on nuclear and conventional weapons, as well as biological weapons, landmines, and small arms.

IPB holds Consultative Status with the United Nations Economic and Social Council (ECOSOC) and associate status with the United Nations Department of Global Communications.

IPB was founded under the name Permanent International Peace Bureau (Bureau International Permanent de la Paix). From 1912 onward it used the name International Peace Bureau. Between 1946 and 1961, it was known under the name International Liaison Committee of Organizations for Peace – ILCOP (Comité de liaison international des organisations de paix – CLIOP).

== Global Campaign on Military Spending ==
The Global Campaign on Military Spending (GCOMS) is a permanent, global, year-round campaign that was created in December 2014 by the IPB to tackle the worldwide issue of excessive military spending.

The aim of the campaign is to pressure the world's governments to invest money in the sectors of health, education, employment and climate change rather than military. It also calls for an annual, minimum reallocation of 10% from the military budgets of all states. Finally, it advocates the reduction of arms production and international weapons trade.

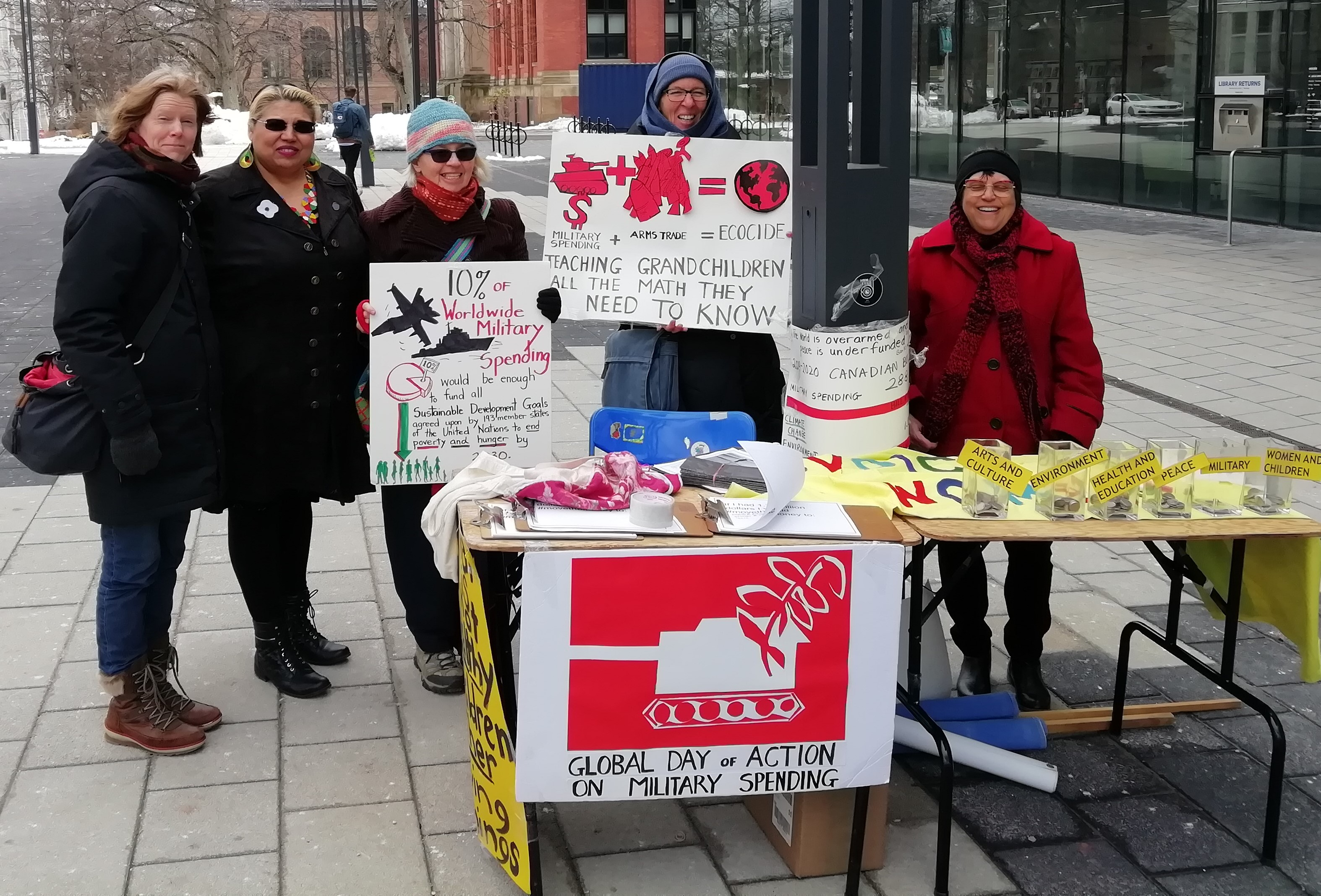
GDAMS actions in Halifax, Canada

The campaign organises the Global Day of Action on Military Spending (GDAMS) to bring public, media and political attention to the costs of military spending and the need to invest in new priorities.

GCOMS is managed from the decentralised Barcelona, Spain, office of IPB in coordination with Centre Delàs of Peace Studies. More than 100 organisations from 35 countries have joined the campaign.

== Nuclear disarmament activism ==
IPB has been in the forefront of nuclear disarmament activities since 1945, including:

- Treaty on the Non-Proliferation of Nuclear Weapons (NPT)
- Comprehensive Nuclear-Test-Ban Treaty (CTBT)
- World Court Project
- Treaty on the Prohibition of Nuclear Weapons (TPNW)

Currently, the IPB is campaigning to encourage the signing and ratification of the TPNW so that it may enter into force.

== Seán MacBride Peace Prize ==
Established in 1992, the Seán MacBride Peace Prize is awarded by the International Peace Bureau to a person or organisation that "has done outstanding work for peace, disarmament and/or human rights." It is named after Seán MacBride, a Nobel Peace Prize winner who was chairman of the IPB from 1968 to 1974 and president from 1974 to 1985.

=== Recipients ===
The following are the recipients of the Seán MacBride Peace Prize since its inception in 1992:

Year	Recipient	Notes	Reference
1992	Michael D. Higgins	For human rights advocacy domestically, and in Nicaragua, Chile, Cambodia, Iraq, and Somalia	
1993	Motarilavoa Hilda Lini	"Played a key role in the WHO's decision to approve a request to the World Court on the legal status of nuclear weapons."	
1994	Mordechai Vanunu	"Sentenced to 18 years solitary confinement for revealing details of Israel's nuclear arsenal."	
1995	The Committee of Soldiers' Mothers of Russia	"Foremost among Russian citizens’ groups opposing the war in Chechnya."	
1996	Selim Bešlagić	For "his fight against nationalism, ethnic cleansing and intolerance during his country's war."	
1997	Seeds of Hope Group	"For disarming a Hawk aircraft bound for Indonesia."	
1998	John Hume	For "his contribution to the Northern Ireland peace process."	
1999	Barbara Gladysch	For her "extraordinary and year-long commitment to disarmament and practical solidarity with victims of wars and disasters."	
2000	1) Praful Bidwai; 2) Achin Vanaik	For being at the "forefront of the international campaign against the nuclearisation of South Asia."	
2001	Rosalie Bertell	For "her lifelong engagement to the cause of peace and for her deep concern for the well-being of peoples all over the planet."	
2002	Barbara Lee	For "her sole vote against the bombing of Afghanistan."	
2003	Nihon Hidankyō	"Survivors of the A bomb attacks on Hiroshima and Nagasaki in 1945. They have devoted the rest of their lives to the elimination of nuclear weapons."	
2004	Leaders of the Geneva Initiative on the Middle East		
2005	No award made		
2006	Mayors for Peace: 1) Tadatoshi Akiba; 2) Iccho Itoh	For "its achievements in arousing international public demand for the abolition of nuclear weapons and lasting world peace."	
2007	Jayantha Dhanapala	For "his dedication to the cause of disarmament and his initiatives towards creating the Central Asian Nuclear-Weapons Free Zone."	
2008	Jacqueline Cabasso	For "her years of outstanding work with NGOs and initiatives toward peace and the abolition of nuclear weapons."	
2009	Betty Reardon	For "her contribution to peace education and to the wider peace movement."	
2010	Binalakshmi Nepram	For "her extraordinary efforts to promote disarmament and an end to gun violence in India."	
2011	1) Hanaa Edwar; 2) Dr. Peter Becker	1) For "her contribution to the advancement of democracy and human rights, as well as her firm stand against violence and war;" 2) For his work with the German section of the International Association of Lawyers Against Nuclear Arms (IALANA).	
2012	1) Lina Ben Mhenni; 2) Nawal El Saadawi	For showing "great courage and ... substantial contributions to what is known as the Arab Spring."	
2013	Chelsea Manning	For her "courageous actions in revealing information about US war crimes."	
2014	The People and Government of the Republic of the Marshall Islands	For "courageously taking the nine nuclear weapons-possessing countries to the International Court of Justice to enforce compliance with the Non-Proliferation Treaty and international customary law."	
2015	The People and the Island Communities of Lampedusa, Italy and Jeju Island, South Korea	For showing "a profound commitment to peace and social justice."	
2016	IPB Secretary-General Colin Archer	For 26 years "in the service of peace and of the IPB community."	
2017	1) All Okinawa Council Against Henoko New Base; 2) Noam Chomsky; 3) Jeremy Corbyn	1) For "its unflagging commitment to close the Futemna Marine Air Base, and for its nonviolent opposition to the construction of a massive new air, land and sea base in Henoko;"; 2) For his "tireless commitment to peace, his strong critiques to U.S. foreign policy, and his anti-imperialism;" 3) For his "sustained and powerful political work for disarmament and peace."	
2018	1) Association For Historical Dialogue and Research and Home for Cooperation; 2) Helena Maleno; 3) Douglas Roche	1) For its "efforts and promotion of [a] Culture of Peace and as well as the peace building activities;" 2) For her "efforts to save hundreds of lives in the Mediterranean Sea, and her strong commitment to defending human rights;" 3) For his "tireless efforts to promote international peace and disarmament."	
2019	1) Bruce Kent 2) Elayne Whyte Gómez	1) An "internationally known peace activist and a 'real peace hero' who, even in his 90th year, remains an active campaigner and organizer for peace and human rights." 2) For "her invaluable contribution to the completion of the historic Treaty on the Prohibition of Nuclear Weapons."	
2020	Black Lives Matter	For its "leading roles in building resistance to and transforming local policies against systemic police violence and extrajudicial murders of Black people across the United States."	
2021	1) Alexander Kmentt 2) Assistant Association for Political Prisoners (AAPP)	1) "For his dedication towards disarmament and the elimination of nuclear weapons, bringing these issues to the highest level of government and imploring decision makers to take notice and action and being one of the key architects to the Treaty on the Prohibition of Nuclear Weapons." 2) "For their dedication, courage and diligence ensuring that every life taken by military during the country's struggle to return the power to the right hands is properly documented – in the face of threats due to the military coup in Myanmar in February 2021."	
2022	1) Hiroshi "Taka" Takakusaki 2) Esset Samatova & Yurii Sheliazhenko 3) Fred Lubang	1) "For his lifelong dedication to a just peace, the abolition of nuclear weapons and social justice, as well as his care and unstinting support for the Hibakusha." 2) Two peace and human rights activists whose common goal is a peaceful world, women's and human rights – showing us what commitment and bravery looks like in the face of unjust war." 3) "For his unflagging work and commitment towards peacebuilding, disarmament and non-violence, especially in the face of ongoing wars."	
2023	1) Our House, Movement of Conscientious Objectors (MCO) & Ukrainian Pacifist Movement 2) Tore Nærland	1) "At the heart of this esteemed award are three remarkable movements that have not only made significant strides in advocating for the right to conscientious objection but have also symbolized the enduring spirit of peace in the face of adversity." 2) "Through his tireless efforts and determination, he has inspired countless individuals to embrace the idea that peace can be pursued actively, one pedal stroke at a time. His commitment to spreading a message of peace and understanding transcends national boundaries and resonates with people from all walks of life."	
2024	1) Indigenous activists Ima Lourembam Nganbi, Dr. Pantibonliu Gonmei, and a Third Indigenous Woman Peace Advocate (Name Withheld for Security Reasons) 2) Parents Circle-Families Forum 3) Alliance for Middle East Peace	1) "Despite significant personal risks, these women have worked fearlessly to defend vulnerable populations, challenge militarization, and amplify the voices of communities affected by conflict. The very fact that the third Indigenous woman awardee's name is withheld for security reasons is itself a testament to the dangers they face in pursuing peace and justice at their work." 2) "The Parents Circle-Families Forum is a network of bereaved Israeli and Palestinian families who have lost loved ones to the conflict. Through remarkable efforts in dialogue and reconciliation, they work to promote mutual understanding and nonviolence. Their unwavering commitment to human dignity and healing serves as a powerful reminder that even the deepest wounds of war can be mended." 3) "The Alliance for Middle East Peace (ALLMEP) unites over 150 organizations across the region, advancing peacebuilding, conflict resolution, and grassroots cooperation. By amplifying local peace initiatives and fostering cross-border dialogues, ALLMEP lays the groundwork for coexistence, transcending political divisions and historical grievances."	
2025	1) Hania Bitar 2) Randa Siniora 3) Boris Kagarlitsky	1) "Through her leadership of PYALARA, which she founded in 1999, Hania frames peace as a dynamic process of empowering young Palestinians to resist injustice and aspire for freedom via knowledge, resilience, civic and political engagement." 2) For documenting "human rights violations in the occupied Palestinian territories for three decades" and providing "legal aid, social counseling and protection services to women victims of gender-based violence" in Jerusalem. 3) For his anti-war activism and "critical stance against capitalism, imperialism, and militarism."	

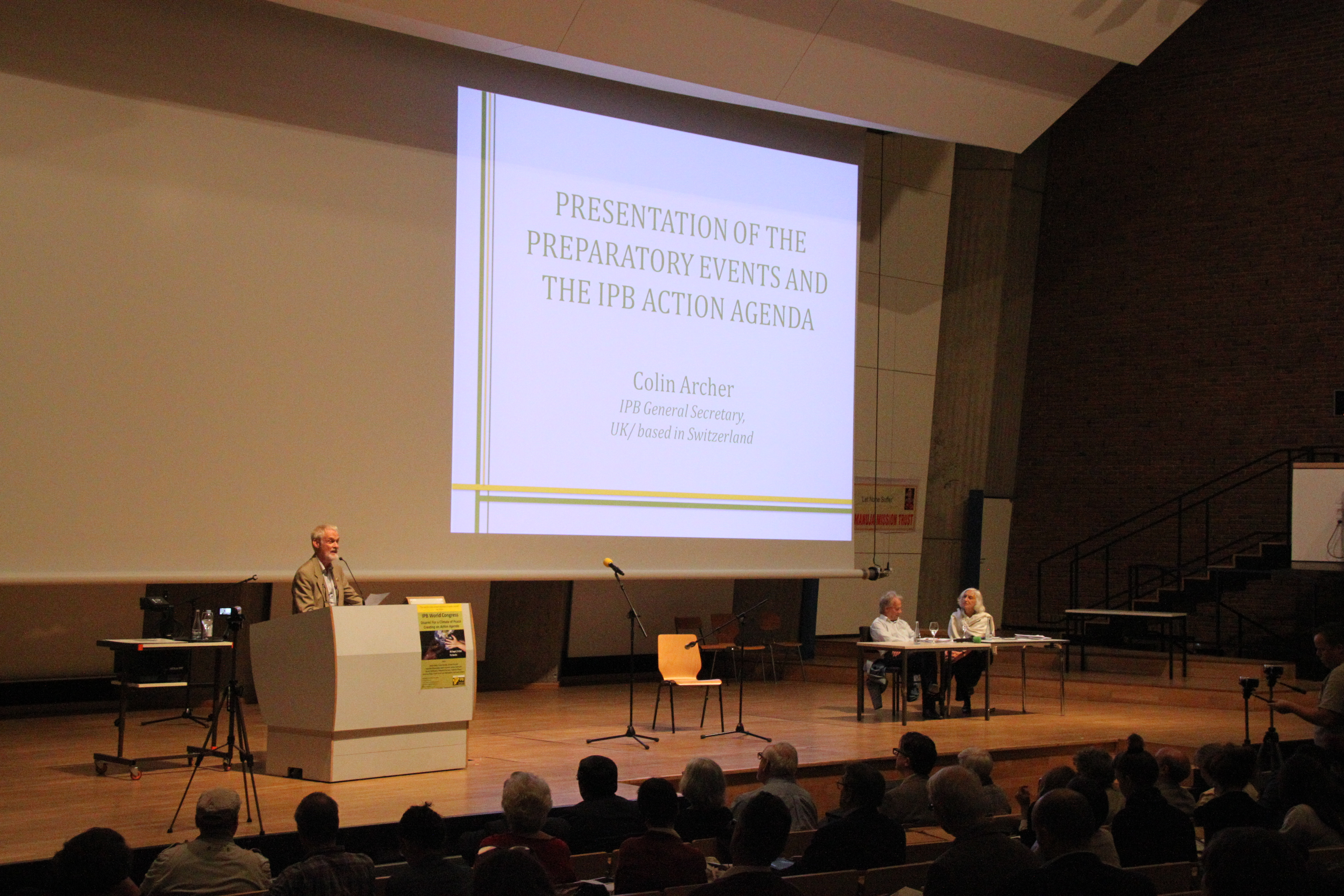
International Peace Bureau World Congress Berlin 2016

== Nobel Peace Prizes ==
IPB's work was rewarded by the Nobel Peace Prize in 1910, which has also been awarded to some of its members:

- 1901 : Frédéric Passy (France), IPB council member
- 1902 : Élie Ducommun and Albert Gobat (Switzerland), first honorary secretaries of IPB
- 1905 : Bertha von Suttner (Austria), writer and honorary vice-president of IPB
- 1907 : Ernesto Moneta (Italy), IPB council member
- 1908 : Fredrik Bajer (Denmark), honorary president of IPB
- 1910 : The International Peace Bureau
- 1911 : Alfred Fried (Austria), IPB council member
- 1913 : Henri La Fontaine (Belgium), president of IPB
- 1927 : Ludwig Quidde (Germany), IPB council member
- 1959 : Philip Noel-Baker (United Kingdom), IPB vice-president
- 1962 : Linus Pauling (United States), IPB vice-president
- 1974 : Seán MacBride (Ireland), IPB chairman and president
- 1982 : Alva Myrdal (Sweden), IPB vice-president

== Presidents ==
The IPB has a co-president system that ensures a gender-balance among leadership. Each president can currently serve up to two terms of three years.

- Henri La Fontaine – 1907–1943
- Ernst Wolf – 1963–1974
- Seán MacBride – 1974–1985
- Bruce Kent – 1985–1992
- Maj Britt Theorin – 1992–2000
- Cora Weiss – 2000–2006
- Tomas Magnusson – 2006–2013
- Ingeborg Breines – 2009–2016
- Reiner Braun – 2013–2019
- Lisa Clark – 2016–2022
- Philip Jennings – 2019–2025
- Corazon Valdez Fabros 2025–present
- Joseph Gerson 2025-present

== Sources ==
- Gobat, Albert, Développement du Bureau international permanent de la paix. Bern, 1910.
- Herz, Ulrich, The International Peace Bureau: History, Aims, Activities. Geneva, 1969.
- From Nobel Lectures, Peace 1901-1925, Editor Frederick W. Haberman, Elsevier Publishing Company, Amsterdam, 1972.
