= Ingeborg Breines =

Norwegian peace educator

- Born: 14 August 1945 (age 80)
- Organization: World Summit of Nobel Peace Laureates

Ingeborg Breines (born 14 August 1945 in Singerfjord) is a Norwegian peace educator. She is senior advisor to the World Summit of Nobel Peace Laureates. She served as director of the Women and a Culture of Peace Programme of UNESCO and from 2009 to 2016 was President of the International Peace Bureau.

== Education ==
Breines studied philosophy and French literature at the University of Nantes and the University of Oslo.

== International Men's Day ==
Breines was one of the advocators in the creation of International Men's Day while serving UNESCO.

== Selected publications ==
- Towards a Women's Agenda for a Culture of Peace.
- Creating an Active Disgust for War.
- 60 women contributing to the 60 years of UNESCO.

== See also ==
- UNESCO
- World Summit of Nobel Peace Laureates
