= Women's Center For Legal Aid and Counseling =

Organization in Palestine

The Women's Centre for Legal Aid and Counseling (WCLAC) is an independent Palestinian, non-profit, non-governmental organization active in East Jerusalem and throughout the West Bank. Founded in 1991 by Maha Abu Dayyeh, WCLAC holds special consultative status with the United Nations Economic and Social Council (ECOSOC).

WCLAC addresses issues of gender based violence in Palestine through research and the proposition of legislation, legal aid, social counseling and protection services to improve conditions for women throughout the region.

Currently headed by Randa Siniora, WCLAC provides support and aid for women throughout Palestine. Addressing femicide, unilateral divorce, gender based discrimination, and gender specific issues, WCLAC provides Palestinian men and women access to the legal system and educational resources.

== History ==
Although the WCLAC's origins can be traced back to 1921 when the first women's union in Jerusalem was founded and Palestinian women's organized feminist activism began, the rise of the Palestinian Women's Autonomous Movement in the 1990s sparked the creation of the WCLAC during a period where feminist thought and women's activism found new footing. The late 1980s through the 1990s also saw a large wave of NGO establishment in Palestine. From its start the WCLAC operated simultaneously as an NGO and feminist organization during a time when both were increasing in number.

At a time when gender-based discrimination and violence started to garner global attention, the WCLAC with their organizational partners and feminist allies, designed and implemented a coordinated series of activities as the Palestinian Model Parliament. This national campaign throughout Palestine between 1994 and 1998 sought to secure national legislation to formally establish, guarantee, and protect the rights and participation of women in civil society. With the goal of raising public awareness through media, lobbying, and public meetings and conversations, the WCLAC planned and hosted five distinct Model Parliaments in five different cities across Palestine. Their focus was to mobilize and educate all members of society including men. They approached various women's organizations for collaboration, created a handbook for methods of organizing and lobbying, and provided workshops on these methods. The Model Parliament pushed for "total equality" for women, establishing a democratic approach to legal change.

Because the project spoke out against unilateral divorce and gender based violence, the project and its organizers faced backlash from the clergy in the Islamic Establishment in Palestine, Hamas, and middle-class activists leading to the reach of the WCLAC to be curtailed. Painting the women in the organization as a non-Muslim minority that was forcing women to divorce their husbands, these groups pushed WCLAC out of shari'a towns. These groups also made it impossible for women leaders of the WCLAC, some of whom were lawyers, to practice law in shari'a courts.

Despite this backlash, the Model Parliament led to broader conversations surrounding the necessity of legal and social programs to support women throughout the Palestinian territory. The Parliament placed the WCLAC at the forefront of public discourse surrounding women's rights and gender specific issues in Palestine.

== Legislation and Research: Response to Gender-based Violence ==
=== Action Oriented Research ===
Noting the increase in femicide and honor killings, the WCLAC has identified specific cases that have been categorized and disguised as accidents. Following the case of the honor killing of Aya Al-Baradiya that sentenced the perpetrator to seven months in prison, national attention grew around laws that fail to enforce gender equality in Palestine. By keeping track of these cases, WCLAC leaders have attempted to change these gender-based inequalities and fight for justice for women who have been killed to uphold familial honor.

Employing a method of action-oriented research that analyzes data in order to properly and correctly identify offenses and generate awareness, WCLAC conducts research projects on honor killings and femicide. Through a survey centered around honor killings, the WCLAC asked women to identify the likely perpetrators of honor killings in order to obtain first hand and up-to-date number of cases and other data on the topic.

=== Legislation ===
The WCLAC has submitted statements to the United Nations (UN) about the disproportionate effects of violence and legislation on women drawing on data collected by the Palestinian Central Bureau of Statistics. Noting disparities between the population of women and women's political participation, the WCLAC has brought international attention to governmental actions that have hindered female political participation throughout Palestine. Following the country's ratification of the UN Convention on the Elimination of all Forms of Discrimination Against Women, the WCLAC emphasized that the Palestinian government failed to bring the country's legislation up to international standards. Advocating for a policy that calls for the country's government to promote dialogue surrounding a women's agenda, the WCLAC has continued to educate the public and provide access to the country's legal systems.

Continuing their work through yearly data collection on femicide and honor killings in Palestine, the WCLAC has tracked data on femicides and honor killings against married Palestinian women, mothers, and unmarried women. Addressing this violence, the WCLAC called in 2020 for the overturning of Personal Status Laws that discriminated against women in marriage, childcare, and inheritance. Calling for an end to unilateral divorce and the protection of women in the family, the WCLAC urged the immediate passage of the Family Protection Bill to protect Palestinian women in the home.

== Addressing Gender-specific Issues of Israeli Occupation ==
Increasing in recent years, the WCLAC has spoken out about the increased militarization of Israeli occupation and the manifold ways this has affected Palestinian women. The organization has submitted statements to the UN to urge support for inquiries into the violations committed against Palestinians including illegal blockades and a closure policy on Gaza by Israel. They have pointed out that the blockades led to inhumane conditions that the UN deemed unfit for human habitation. In the wake of full-scale military offensives by Israel in May 2021 against Gaza, the group spoke out against air strikes in areas filled with civilians, civilians being deliberately targeted in their homes, and the destruction of public infrastructure that led to the death of 260 Palestinians and left over 1900 Palestinians injured in Gaza.

The WCLAC also brought attention to what these violations held for the women living in Gaza. Stating that Gazan women hold the role of caregivers, they explained that the destruction of infrastructure and militarization had left the majority of injured and traumatized children without shelter. The WCLAC noted the new burden on women as it was women's responsibilities to care for these children. Highlighting the specific verbal and sexual abuse suffered by Palestinian women under Israeli Occupation, the WCLAC also brought attention to other gender-specific issues of occupation. As a political response to these women's experiences, the WCLAC called for an end to a culture of impunity–that fails to bring perpetrators of human rights violations to justice, a prosecution of Israeli settlers, a demand that Israel ends the blockade on Gaza, Human Rights Council (HRC) member support for justice and accountability, support and facilitation for the commission of inquiry mandate, and for third states to impose sanctions and other serious measures to hold Israel accountable for the use of explosive weapons. Discussing the specific violations of Israeli occupation in 2021, the WCLAC spoke out about the legal obligations of Israeli occupation under the Fourth Geneva Convention, citing failure to ensure access to healthcare, food, and medical supplies along with failure to maintain public sanitation during occupation.

The WCLAC also secured funding to establish a shelter in Bethlehem, offering refuge to women and children escaping gender-based violence as a result of increased militarization of Israeli occupation. A Memorandum of Understanding with the Ministry of Social Affairs (MOSA) led to the operation of an emergency shelter in a West Bank city.
