= LGBTQ rights in the Islamic State =

LGBTQ rights in Islamic State
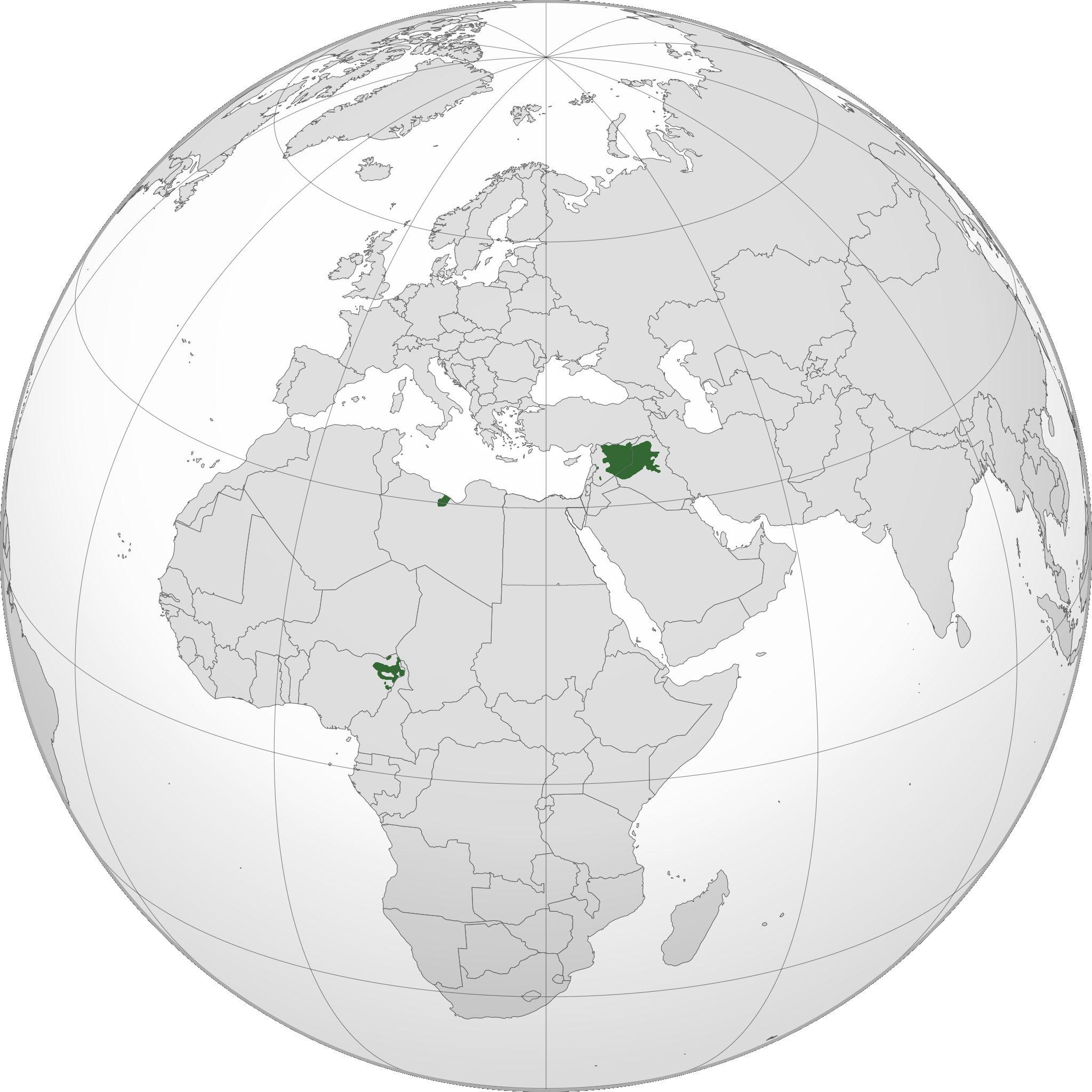
- Islamic state
- Legal status: Illegal
- Penalty: Execution, imprisonment, lashings, fines, vigilante tortures, beatings, honor killings, vigilante executions, and stonings
- Gender identity: No
- Military: No
- Discrimination protections: No

Family rights
- Recognition of relationships: No recognition of same-sex relationships
- Adoption: No

Violence against LGBTQ people is part of the ideology of the Islamic State (ISIS), which mandates capital punishment for homosexuality within its territory, in Iraq, Syria, and Libya.

== Laws regarding same-sex sexual activity ==
Law enforcement in ISIS-controlled areas purports to carry out punishments. This means that homosexuals caught engaging in same-sex affairs should be thrown from rooftops. If they do not die on impact then they should be stoned to death.

ISIS has published a list of offenses that will result in automatic execution, including homosexuality.

According to Subhi Nahas, a gay Syrian who escaped Syria fearing for his life, he had heard that while ISIS was sparing effeminate gay men "for the pleasure of older men", the "masculine" men suspected of being gay were being killed. He also stated that gay men joined ISIS to protect themselves and their families, sometimes reporting on fellow gays to conceal themselves more effectively.

== Documented executions in ISIS-controlled territory ==
On November 23, 2014, ISIS fighters stoned to death a 20-year-old unidentified man in Mayadin, Syria, and fighters stoned to death an 18-year-old unidentified man in Deir Ezzor, Syria. The men were known opponents of ISIS, and their supporters say ISIS had used the allegation that they were gay as justification to execute them. This was the first reported execution of LGBTQ people by ISIS.

On April 30, 2015, it was reported that three men, accused of being homosexual, were executed by being shot in the head by the ISIS in Derna, Libya. Human rights activists consider this the first death sentence against homosexuals in the history of modern Libya.

From December 9, 2014, to May 7, 2016, OutRight Action International estimated that 41 gay men were executed in ISIS controlled territories in Iraq and Syria.

On July 22, 2016, it was reported by activists that ISIS executed a young Iraqi man in Kirkuk, Iraq, by throwing him from the top of a building on charges of being gay. His corpse was later stoned by the crowd. ISIS arrested the man under the pretext that he was a homosexual.

On August 10, 2016, a video was released by ISIS showing ISIS religious police, known as "hisbah", in "Wilayat al-Jazirah", Iraq, which shows a gay man being thrown off a building. According to the Terrorism Research & Analysis Consortium, Wilayat al-Jazirah used to be considered part of Wilayat Ninawa, which contains Mosul. Vulnerable cities in Wilayat al-Jazirah include "Tal 'Afar, Al-Ba'aj, Al-'Ayadiyyah, Al-Mahlabiyyah, Sinjar, Wardiyyah, Sanuni, Khana Sor, Ibrat al-Saghira, Al-Badi, Al-Qanat."

On August 20, 2016, a local source in Nineveh province, Iraq, revealed that ISIS executed four men on charges of homosexuality and sodomy, including two of its own members, by throwing them off a building.

On December 5, 2016, ISIS threw a gay man accused of 'homosexual relations' off top of a building in Maslamah City in Aleppo, Syria.

On January 9, 2017, a 17-year-old male was arrested and thrown off a building by the Diwan al-Hisba in Mosul under the pretext that he was "a homosexual".

On March 27, 2017, IS Diwan al-Hisbah published photos showing a gay man being thrown off a roof and being stoned to death for being gay in Mosul.

== International terrorist attacks ==
- Pulse nightclub shooting
- 2026 Berlin Pride attack

== Reactions ==
On June 14, 2016, the House of Commons of Canada voted 166–139 against a Conservative parliamentary motion to recognize the atrocities targeting Yazidis, Christians, Shia Muslims, other ethnic and religious groups, and gays and lesbians to be defined as genocide.

The U.S. Department of State's Country Reports on Human Rights Practices for 2016 for the countries of Iraq and Syria stated that:

Da'esh published videos depicting alleged executions of persons accused of homosexual activity that included stoning and being thrown from buildings. In July, UNAMI reported a young man had been abducted and killed in Baghdad because of his sexual orientation. Sources reported the abductors were known members of armed groups. Some armed groups also started a campaign against homosexual persons in Baghdad, UNAMI reported at least three more LGBTI persons had disappeared since July. In previous years photographs and videos appeared showing Da'esh pushing men suspected of "being gay" from rooftops in Raqqa governorate or stoning them to death. According to Outright International, on May 7, Da'esh's media office issued a "photo report about the imposition of sharia punishment" on those suspected of belonging to the LGBTI community. The photographs included images of a boy pushed from the top of a building.

=== Misattributed images ===
In 2023, during the early stages of the Gaza war, a video described as “Hamas executes people by throwing them off a roof of a building!” was shared widely on social media. But the video did not depict Hamas or any other group based in Palestine; it was a video of ISIS in Iraq from 2015. A July 2015 report from Al Arabiya included identical images that were originally shared by ISIS and showed the execution of four gay men by ISIS in Fallujah, Iraq.

== See also ==
- Iraqi Turkmen genocide
- Yazidi genocide
- Persecution of Shias by the Islamic State
- Persecution of Christians by the Islamic State
- Human rights in ISIS-controlled territory
- LGBT rights in Afghanistan
- LGBT rights in Iraq
- LGBT activism in Iraq
- LGBT rights in Libya
- LGBT rights in Syria
- The Queer Insurrection and Liberation Army
