= Rana Ahmad =

Syrian activist (born 1985)

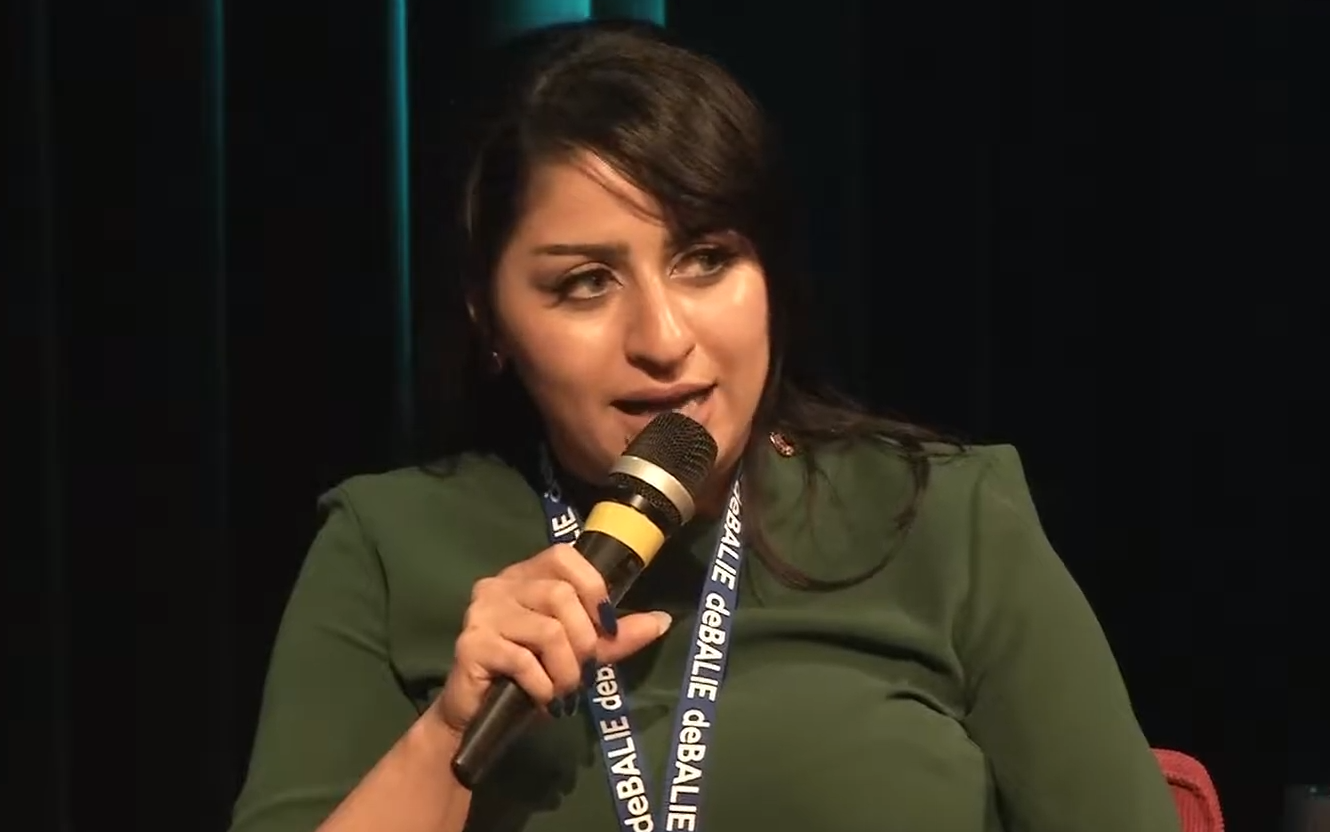
- Ahmad speaking at Celebrating Dissent 2019 at De Balie, Amsterdam.
- Born: 1985 (age 40–41); Riyadh, Saudi Arabia
- Occupations: Women's rights activist; Author; Speaker; Refugee worker
- Known for: Abandonment of Islam
- Notable work: Frauen dürfen hier nicht träumen

Rana Ahmad or Rana Ahmad Hamd (born 1985) is the pseudonym of a Syrian women's rights activist and ex-Muslim born in Riyadh, Saudi Arabia, who fled to Germany in 2015, where she currently resides. Her flight, assisted by Atheist Republic and Faith to Faithless, was partially documented in the Vice News documentary Leaving Islam: Rescuing Ex-Muslims (2017). Her 2018 German-language autobiography Frauen dürfen hier nicht träumen ('Women Aren't Allowed to Dream Here'), also translated into French, and became a Spiegel Top-10-best-seller. In 2017, Ahmad founded the Cologne-based Atheist Refugee Relief with the goal of providing 'practical assistance to refugees without religion and to improve their living conditions through political work.'

== Biography ==
=== Youth ===
Ahmad's father came from Syria to work as a construction manager in Saudi Arabia in the mid-1970s. Four years later, he married Ahmad's mother in Syria and took her to Riyadh. Ahmad was born there in 1985 and has an older and a younger brother and an older sister. Her family was deeply religious, in her words 'an extremist family compared to other families in our society', and that she and her siblings were taught the Quran from the age of 4.

Ahmad went to a state girls' school, (Note: Except for a few international schools, all schools in Saudi Arabia are strictly segregated by gender from the age of 6 or 7.) where more than a quarter of all education was dedicated to religion. She was taught that all non-Muslims would go to hell, and that hating Christians and Jews was a religious duty. She was allowed to cycle around on her bike, for example to buy groceries, when the family was on holiday at her father's parents in Syria. But at the age of 10, her grandfather took her bike away, saying she was 'too old for that now', which she felt robbed her of her most important freedom. Amhad did not understand why it should be considered haram if "big girls" like her ride a bike, but not if boys do the same. The very next day, also from the age of 10, Ahmad was compelled to wear an abaya and a black hijab. Although Saudi law does not require women to wear headgear that is more restrictive than the hijab, at age 13 Ahmad was compelled by her family and her school to wear an even more face-covering niqab, which only left her eyes uncovered. Although she didn't understand the religious rules that were subsequently imposed upon her, she accepted and complied. She had never had any contact with a boy or man that was not related to her until she reached adulthood.

=== Higher education and online exploration ===
At the age of 19, Ahmad was to be married off, and an engagement party took place in Syria, but because her would-be husband refused to move to Saudi Arabia and she refused to move to Syria, the plans did not materialise. Meanwhile, her husband turned abusive and prompted her to seek a divorce and move back in with her parents, which stained her reputation in society. She rejected three more marriage proposals by Saudi men in subsequent years, arguing she wanted to advance her education first. Ahmad attended vocational school courses in English and EDP, then worked as a receptionist and office worker in various medical practices and hospitals. Due to the Saudi male guardianship system, however, she could barely leave the house and if she wanted to travel by car, her male relatives had to drive her; she wasn't allowed to travel alone.

However, the restrictions and obligations of being a married woman made her question her role, her religion and evolved into a desire for freedom. In search for answers to her questions, she turned to the internet, discovering philosophy (which Ahmad says is banned in Saudi Arabia) and atheism at the age of 25. This happened in 2011, when she ran into a tweet from someone using the Twitter handle "Arab Atheist", which she had to Google Translate to understand. Shocked, Ahmad contacted "Arab Atheist", who recommended her multiple documentaries (for example, on the theory of evolution and the Big Bang) and books from Richard Dawkins, Friedrich Nietzsche, Voltaire and Charles Darwin translated to Arabic. "I cried when I discovered all the things I was never taught, what they withheld from me," Ahmad said in a 2016 interview. After about a year, she concluded she could no longer believe, because of all the contradictions in the Quran. It caused her even greater fear and sorrow to realise that atheism and apostasy in Saudi Arabia were punishable by death, and she probably had to leave the country and everything she had behind, in order to survive. She hid her changing views from her family and continued praying five times a day, while she searched for help online from various groups such as Faith to Faithless, Ex-Muslims of North America and Atheist Republic. For five years, she lived as a closeted atheist in Saudi Arabia, terrified that her family would kill her or the state would execute her if her nonbelief were discovered.

=== Family troubles ===
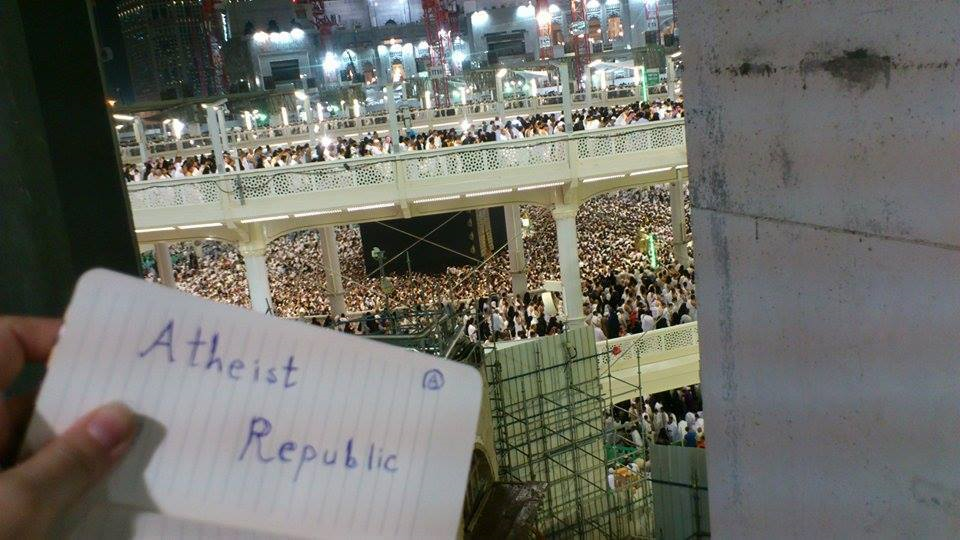
Rana held this Atheist Republic paper in the Great Mosque of Mecca.

Ahmad's older brother began to suspect she was secretly seeing men, and placed a covert listening device in her room. Catching her calling with a male friend, he stormed her room and tried to kill her, but their father heard her screams for help and intervened. After this incident, Ahmad tried to commit suicide by cutting her wrists, but again her father found her in time to take her to the hospital and save her life. Ahmad got a new job as secretary at a school for mentally disabled children. Meanwhile, she took on English studies.

When her mother discovered Ahmad's tweets about religious doubts, she was furious and put Ahmad under house arrest for a month without access to her laptop or smartphone. Her mother forced her to pray and recite the Quran. In 2014, she was forced by her family to participate in the hajj. She sought and found the help of Atheist Republic as well as other similar organisations online. While on hajj, she took a picture of herself holding a piece of paper with "Atheist Republic" written on it, while standing inside the Great Mosque of Mecca facing the Kaaba, the holiest site of Islam. She was extremely frightened because she knew she would be killed if the people around her saw the paper and discovered her nonbelief, but she wanted to tell the internet that she existed as an atheist in Mecca and, like many nonbelievers in Saudi Arabia, was not here by her own choice. It was also the first time she decided she had to leave the country quickly, or otherwise end her life. She requested Atheist Republic to upload the photo to Facebook after she left Mecca, and they did so on 3 August 2014; a few days later she was overwhelmed to find it had gone viral.

=== Flight ===
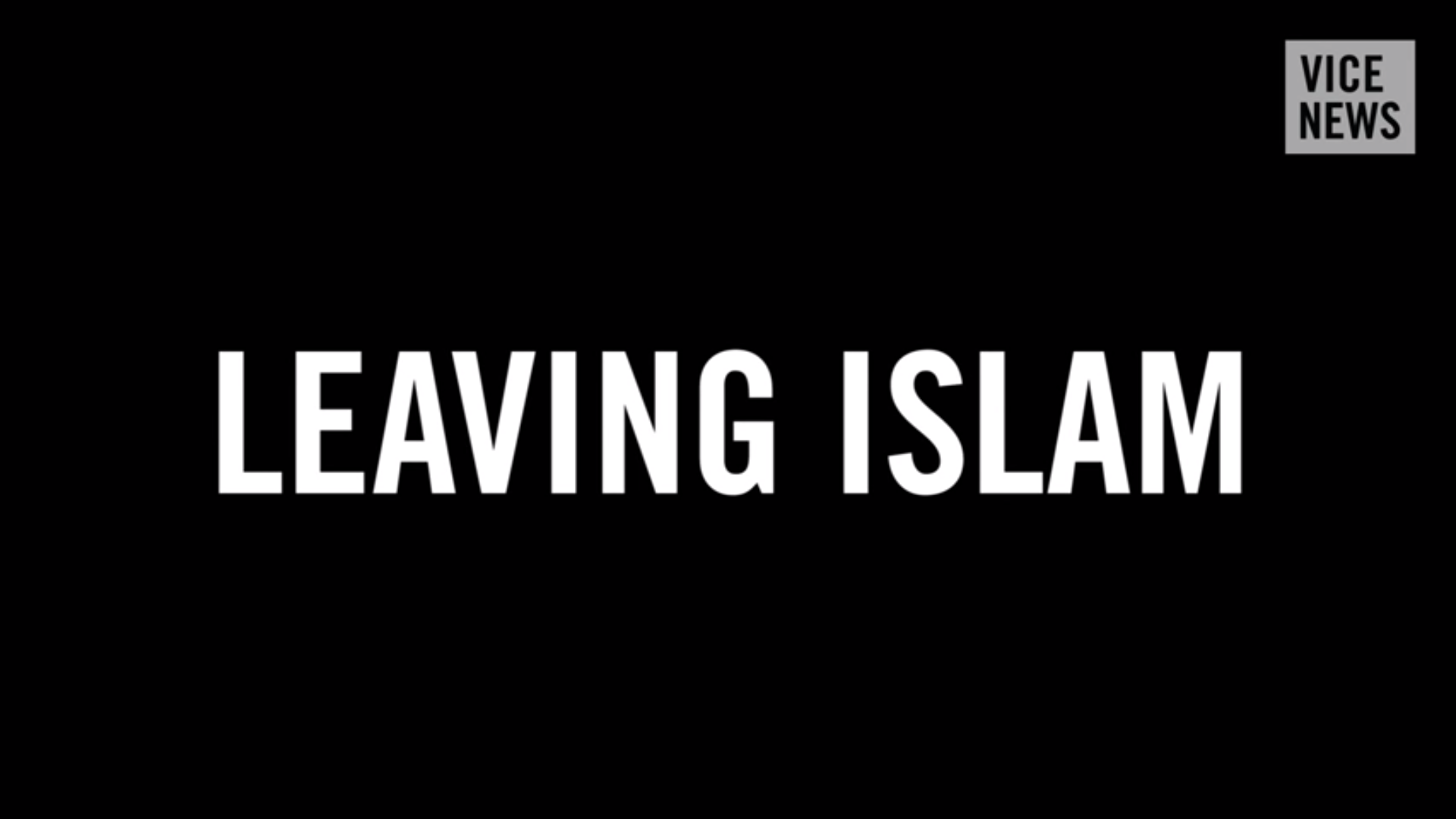
The 2016 Vice News film Rescuing Ex-Muslims: Leaving Islam documents Rana Ahmad's flight to Germany.

Ahmad made plans to escape the country, aided by Faith to Faithless. At first, Ahmad sought to flee to the Netherlands, but the embassy refused to grant her a visa. Thereafter she thought of marrying a like-minded man to leave the country with, but found no candidate. Because her Syrian passport would be outdated by the end of 2015 and the Syrian embassy in Saudi Arabia was closed (since 2012 due to the Syrian Civil War), Ahmad had to hurry and could only flee to a country without a visa requirement, such as Turkey. As a foreign woman from Syria, her employer rather than her father had to grant her permission to travel abroad, and she was able to convince him that she was going on a family holiday so he signed the papers for her.

On 26 May 2015, she took an aeroplane from Riyadh via Dubai to Istanbul Atatürk Airport, only taking her laptop, documents (including her Syrian passport) and 200 American dollars. She took off her hijab and abaya upon arrival for the first time as an adult in public, and henceforth adopted her pseudonym 'Rana Ahmad (Hamd)' to frustrate attempts by her family to track her down. After four days she took the bus to a friend (another ex-Muslim from Syria) in İzmir, who offered her a small house for rent. For the first time in her life, Ahmad danced in the street and drank alcohol. However, she received word that her family discovered she had escaped to Turkey and feared they were going to come after her. She cut her hair short, dyed it blonde and put on colourful contact lenses as a disguise. Next, Armin Navabi, the founder of Atheist Republic, started a crowdfunding campaign for her to finance her stay and further journey into the European Union, which raised $5000. In August 2015, Imtiaz Shams from Faith to Faithless, joined by a camera crew of Vice News, came to visit her in İzmir to discuss solutions. After vainly trying to obtain a visa to enter the EU for five months, Ahmad decided to cross the border with Greece illegally by boat, which succeeded on the third attempt.

From Greece, she travelled across North Macedonia, Serbia, Hungary, Slovakia, Austria, reaching Germany in November 2015. Along the way, she stayed in various refugee camps for some time. She cancelled plans to continue to Sweden because she was out of money, tired of travelling and had heard Germany's education system was good.

=== Life in Germany ===
Upon arrival in Germany in November 2015, Ahmad spent a year in a refugee camp located about an hour from Cologne, before she was assigned her own house. On 31 December 2015, the Vice News camera crew visited her again in Cologne. She spent much of her first year reading (physics) books, intending to study nuclear physics or nuclear engineering. She felt threatened by Muslim refugees in the camp, however, many of whom thought of apostasy as a deadly crime. By chance, she discovered by writing to Maryam Namazie that the Central Council of Ex-Muslims was coincidentally headquartered in Cologne as well, and after contacting Mina Ahadi, the Council and the Giordano Bruno Foundation were able to help her find a house for herself.

At the age of 30, after 20 years, she was finally able to buy and ride a bike again in Germany, which she regarded as an important restoration of her freedom. A photo of her holding her new bike in Cologne was used for an Atheist Refugee Relief brochure.

She stated in March 2018 that "I love Germany, I love my free life in Germany." She wanted to adapt quickly, obtain German citizenship, improve her German language skills and support the activities of the Central Council of Ex-Muslims. Since late 2018, Ahmad has been studying physics in Cologne.

== Activism in Germany ==
Maryam Namazie interviews Rana Ahmad in Cologne, 2017.

In subsequent years, Ahmad has given many interviews to several media, primarily German and French ones, about her experiences and her political and religious opinions, especially with regards to the politics of Saudi Arabia and its Crown Prince Mohammed bin Salman after dissident Jamal Khashoggi was assassinated in October 2018. Ahmad commented that Saudi authorities have failed to stimulate the emancipation of women that many activists have campaigned for, often imprisoning them, and thereby sending women the message they have no future in Saudi Arabia and pushing them to flee the country.

The Vice News documentary Leaving Islam: Rescuing Ex-Muslims featuring part of Ahmad's life journey from Saudi Arabia to Germany was broadcast on 10 February 2016. On 5 March 2016, three months after arriving in Germany, Ahmad held her first public speech in Cologne at a meeting organised by the Central Council of Ex-Muslims. She spoke in Arabic about her life in Saudi Arabia, her flight and her opinion on how Western countries should treat refugees such as herself, with Lebanese–German television journalist Imad Karim providing the German translation.

Ahmad gave her first major interview to the Frankfurter Allgemeine Zeitung in June 2016. At the time, she was still in a refugee camp waiting to be assigned her own house, and feeling threatened by Muslim refugees in that camp. "I don't hate Muslims, I've also got good Muslim friends who accept me how I am. What I hate is when rights are taken away in the name of religion, especially from women," she said. Although she has no problem with people who hold Islamic beliefs, it has made her angry seeing a 6- or 8-year-old girl being forced to wear the veil in Germany, where German law rather than sharia applies. It also upsets her that some Muslims don't accept Jews.

Ahmad in conversation in De Balie during Celebrating Dissent 2019.

On 15 August 2016, Ahmad was interviewed on television for the first time by journalist Jaafar Abdul Karim from Deutsche Welle in Arabic, excerpts of which were translated to English and other languages. Three million people saw her on television declaring she had left Islam, and excerpts from it went viral on the Internet, resulting in Muslims from around the world sending her numerous threats and insults.

With the help of the Central Council of Ex-Muslims and the Giordano Bruno Foundation, Ahmad founded the Atheist Refugee Relief in March 2017, and officially presented at the 10th anniversary of the Council on 17 November 2017. Its goal is 'to support refugees who are discriminated against or even threatened with their very lives because of their atheistic conviction or their critical attitude towards religion.' The Relief's volunteers are working on a daily basis to protect especially female atheist refugees – as they are targeted more frequently and viciously – from further persecution (for example, 'assaults, exclusion, threats and violence') in Germany. As of December 2018, it has helped 37 recognised nonreligious refugees since November 2017, but the demand was rising quickly. According to Dittmar Steiner, the Atheist Refugee Relief received 'two to three requests [for help] a week' when it started, which had increased to 'between seven and nine a day' a year later.

On 15 January 2018, her book Frauen dürfen hier nicht träumen: Mein Ausbruch aus Saudi-Arabien, mein Weg in die Freiheit ('Women Aren't Allowed to Dream Here: My Escape from Saudi Arabia and My Path to Freedom') was published in Germany and became a Spiegel Top-10-best-seller. A French translation was published in Paris in October 2018 under the name Ici, les femmes ne rêvent pas : Récit d'une évasion ('Here, Women Do Not Dream: Story of an Escape'). According to Ahmad, "We, women, we can change our lives, be free. We think we are weak, but that is wrong; we are strong, and this book proves it."

== Book ==
- German original: Ahmad, Rana; Borufka, Sarah (2018). Frauen dürfen hier nicht träumen: Mein Ausbruch aus Saudi-Arabien, mein Weg in die Freiheit ('Women Aren't Allowed to Dream Here: My Escape from Saudi Arabia and My Path to Freedom'). btb Verlag. p. 320. ISBN 978-3442757480.
- French translation: Ahmad, Rana; Borufka, Sarah (2018). Ici, les femmes ne rêvent pas : Récit d'une évasion ('Here, Women Do Not Dream: Story of an Escape'). Translated by Olivier Mannoni. Globe Éditions. p. 320. ISBN 978-2211237710.

== See also ==
- Atheist Refugee Relief
- Rahaf Mohammed
- Dina Ali Lasloom
- Worood Zuhair
