= Praful Bidwai =

Indian journalist (1949 - 2015)

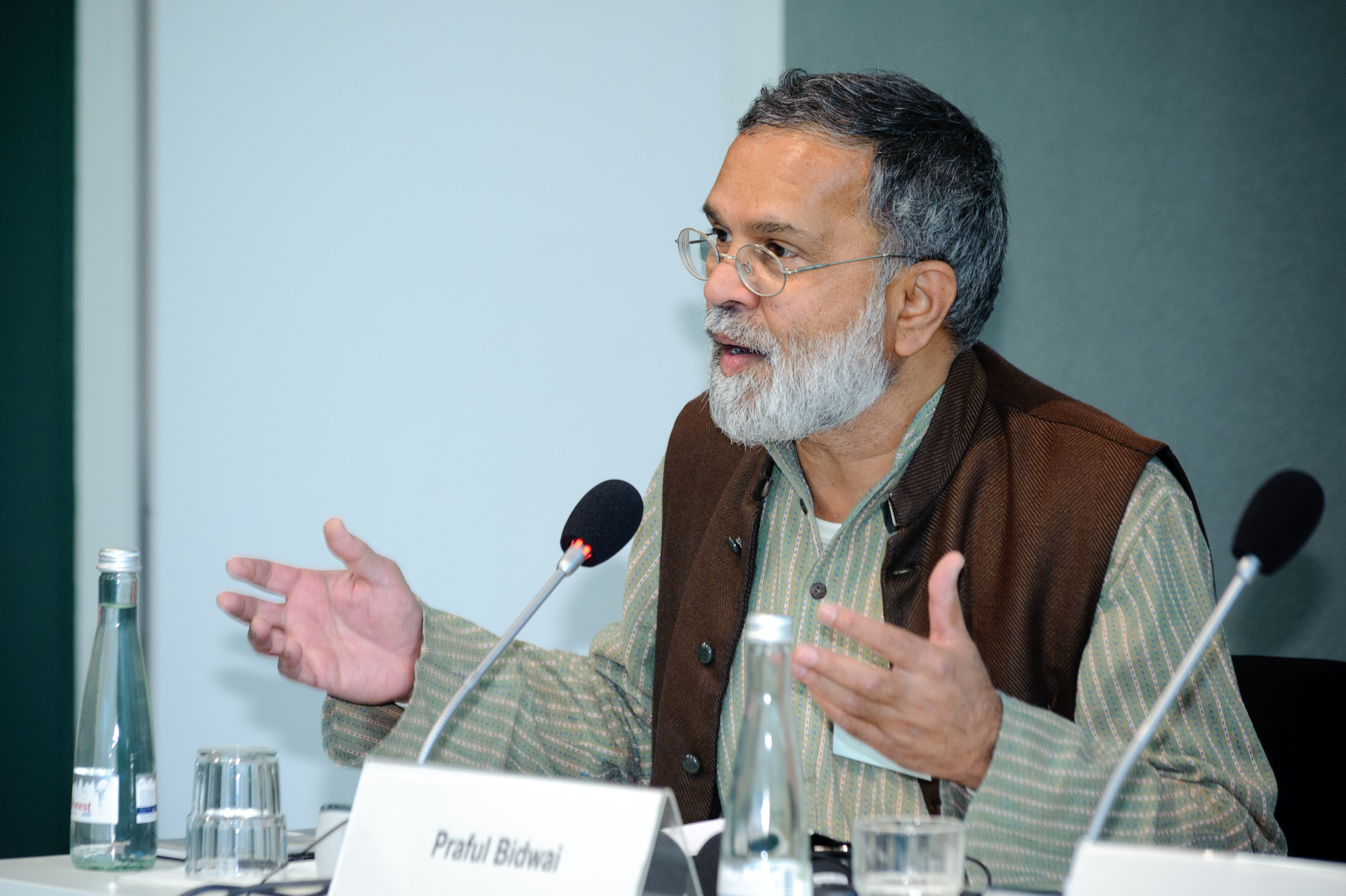
- Praful Bidwai (2011)
- Born: 12 June 1949
- Died: 23 June 2015 (aged 66)
- Occupations: Journalist; political analyst; activist

Praful Bidwai (12 June 1949 – 23 June 2015) was an Indian journalist, political analyst, and activist. He was known for his left-leaning analysis of India's politics and economics. In Bidwai's memory, his friends, including the Transnational Institute, created the Praful Bidwai Memorial Award intended to honor and highlight courageous and independent voices in journalism.

== Journalist and columnist ==
Praful Bidwai was a political analyst and commentator, a social science researcher, and an activist on issues of peace, global justice, human rights and environmental protection. He died of a cardiac arrest on 23 June 2015 while he was attending a conference in Amsterdam.

Bidwai's journalistic career spanned over four decades. His first notable work in journalism was as a columnist for the "Economic and Political Weekly", beginning in 1972. He then worked for magazines and newspapers, including "Business India", "Financial Express" and "The Times of India" between 1981 and 1993, eventually becoming its senior editor. He was "The Times group's" most published journalist for 20 years, writing analytical and investigative articles on themes including politics and political economy; economic policy and industrialization strategies; international relations; energy, the environment and sustainable development; religion, ethnicity and politics; social conflict, communalism and nationalism; science and technology; and nuclear weapons disarmament and peace.

Bidwai was a columnist whose articles were published regularly in the Hindustan Times, Frontline, Rediff.com, and other outlets. He had also been published in The Guardian (London), The Nation (New York), Le Monde Diplomatique (Paris), and Il Manifesto (Rome).

== Left activism ==
Praful Bidwai was a well known face of left intellectual tradition in Indian media. Analysis of gradual erosion of left in Indian politics was the subject of his deep study. He himself had taken part in various left-leaning regional movements in the past and was in long-term association with them even after. The last book that he authored just a few months before his death was regarding the possibilities of the revival of Indian left politics. He was incredibly anti-communal and championed civil liberty and secularism. Bidwai had been a professorial fellow at the Centre for Social Development, New Delhi, and also a senior fellow at the Nehru Memorial Museum and Library. He had also served as a member of the Indian Council of Social Science Research, the Central Advisory Board on Education, and the National Book Trust.

== Peace activism ==
Bidwai was also a veteran peace activist with anti-Imperialist moorings. He helped found the Movement in India for Nuclear Disarmament (MIND), based in New Delhi, was a member of the International Network of Engineers and Scientists against Proliferation, and was one of the leaders of the Coalition for Nuclear Disarmament and Peace, India. Along with Achin Vanaik, Bidwai was the author of New Nukes: India, Pakistan and Global Nuclear Disarmament (Interlink, 1999). In 2000, Bidwai and Vanaik were awarded the Sean McBride International Peace Prize by the International Peace Bureau in recognition of their work opposing nuclear weapons development in South Asia. Praful Bidwai was a fellow of the Transnational Institute.

== Partial bibliography ==
=== Books ===
- "An India That Can Say Yes: A Climate-Responsible Development Agenda for Copenhagen and Beyond" (Heinrich Boell Foundation, New Delhi, 2009)
- South Asia on a Short Fuse. Nuclear Politics and the Future of Global Disarmament, with Achin Vanaik (Oxford UP, 1999), published in the United States as New Nukes. India, Pakistan and Global Nuclear Disarmament (Interlink Publishing: USA, 1999)
- Testing Times. The Global Stake in a Nuclear Test Ban, with Achin Vanaik (Dag Hammerskjöld Foundation: Uppsala, 1996)
- Religion, Religiosity and Communalism, with Harbans Mukhia and Achin Vanaik (South Asia Books, 1996)
- India Under Siege. Challenges Within and Without, with Muchkund Dubey, Anuradha Chenoy and Arun Ghosh (South Asia Books, 1995)

=== Selected articles ===
- "Atoms for Peace: A Failed Promise" In: Survey of the Environment '99, The Hindu, 1999
- "India's Nuclear Daze. The Domestic Politics of Nuclearization" (With Achin Vanaik) In: Testing the Limits, TNI/IPS Amsterdam/Washington, August 1998
- "Nuclear India: A Short History" In: Out of Nuclear Darkness. The Indian Case for Disarmament, MIND (Movement in India for Nuclear Disarmament), New Delhi, 1998
- "Communalism and the Democratic Process in India" (With Achin Vanaik) In: Jochen Hippler (eds). The Democratisation of Disempowerment TNI/Pluto Press, 1995
- "India and Pakistan" (With Achin Vanaik) In: Security with Nuclear Weapons New York, Oxford University Press, 1991
