= Rahaf Mohammed =

Saudi refugee and Honour Killing survivor

- رهف محمد
- Born: Rahaf Mohammed Mutlaq al-Qunun Al-Shammari; 11 March 2000 (age 26); Ḥa'il Province, Saudi Arabia
- Education: University of Ha’il
- Years active: 2019-present
- Known for: Seeking asylum from persecution

Rahaf Mohammed (formerly Rahaf Mohammed Mutlaq al-Qunun Al-Shammari; Arabic: رهف محمد مطلق القنون الشمري; born 11 March 2000) is a Saudi woman who fled from her family in 2019. She was detained by Thai authorities on 5 January while in transit through an airport in Bangkok, en route from Kuwait to Australia. She had intended to claim asylum in Australia and escape her family who she says abused her and threatened to kill her for, among other reasons, leaving Islam, an act that is a capital offence under Saudi law.

After she appealed for help on Twitter and gained significant attention, Thai authorities abandoned their plans to forcibly return her to Kuwait (from where she would be repatriated to Saudi Arabia), and she was taken under the protection of the United Nations High Commissioner for Refugees and granted refugee status. On 11 January 2019, she was granted asylum in Canada and arrived in Toronto the next day.

Since her settlement in Canada, she has written a memoir.

== Early life ==
Rahaf was born on 11 March 2000. Her father is the town governor of al-Sulaimi in the Ha'il Region. She has nine siblings. She was raised in a Wahabist family.

She has claimed that her family had locked her up for months, subjecting her to physical and psychological abuse. Her father has denied abusing her. On one occasion, Rahaf's mother lit a match and tried burning her alive after Rahaf was accused of having premarital sex. Rahaf also said that her cousin threatened to kill her because she no longer follows Islam. Public apostasy in Islam is a crime punishable by death according to the Sharia law of Saudi Arabia.

Rahaf complained of restrictions placed on her as a child, including not being allowed to leave the house without a male guardian. According to her account, she was beaten when her parents caught her kissing a girl and the restrictions intensified. She also stated that she was raped one night while taking a taxi home, but felt unable to tell her family.

== Fleeing from Saudi Arabia ==
=== Detention at Thailand airport hotel ===
Rahaf Mohammed رهف محمد
(@rahaf84427714)
tweeted:

based on the 1951 Convention and the 1967 Protocol, I'm rahaf mohmed, formally seeking a refugee status to any country that would protect me from getting harmed or killed due to leaving my religion and torture from my family.

6 January 2019

While Rahaf was on vacation with her family in Kuwait, she left them and boarded a flight to Bangkok, Thailand. She intended to continue on another flight to seek asylum in Australia. A tourist visa had been issued to her that permitted entry into Australia. Her family reportedly filed a missing person report after her escape from Kuwait. Upon arrival at Suvarnabhumi Airport in Bangkok, a man greeted her, not disclosing that he was a Saudi embassy official, and told her that he needed her passport so that he could help her obtain a Thai visa. He left with her passport and did not return. Mohammed never intended to leave the airport's transit area and therefore did not require a Thai visa.

She was detained by Thai authorities at the Miracle Transit Hotel within the airport.

Mohammed posted about the situation on Twitter, saying that she had renounced Islam and was concerned that she could be murdered by her family if deported to Saudi Arabia. In one tweet, she shared a picture of her passport. She also said she had barricaded herself in her hotel room, was refusing to exit until she met with UN representatives, claimed refugee status, and implored embassy officials of various Western nations to assist her in seeking asylum. While barricaded, Mohammed also allowed a friend to tweet on her behalf.

Her posts spread rapidly, shared by prominent personalities such as international relations lawyer Mahmoud Refaat, and more than half a million tweets using the "#SaveRahaf" hashtag were posted. Australian ABC journalist Sophie McNeill flew to Bangkok and snuck into Mohammed's room, barricading herself with Mohammed to protect her.

Lawyers in Thailand filed an injunction to prevent her forced deportation. The injunction was subsequently dismissed, though an appeal was planned. Thailand's chief of immigration at the Royal Thai Police Surachate Hakparn subsequently confirmed that authorities in the country had acted at the behest of Saudi Arabia.

Mohammed was scheduled to be forcibly repatriated on a flight to Kuwait on 7 January 2019. She barricaded her room to block entry, while at times live-streaming airport staff trying to get her to leave the room. She refused to leave. Upon intervention of Mahmoud Refaat, the Thai government released a statement saying that they would not deport her. François Zimeray, a lawyer chosen by the European Saudi Organisation for Human Rights to defend Mohammed in Bangkok against deportation back to Saudi Arabia, judged that Mohammed's tweets had played an overwhelming role in preventing her deportation. Zimeray stated that the Thai authorities' attitude changed "completely" in "a few minutes" when they realized the strength of international support for Mohammed. Mohammed revealed in a later interview that she wrote a goodbye letter, having planned to commit suicide if she was deported to Saudi Arabia.

==== Initial discrepancies in Thai government's accounts of events ====
In an initial assessment on 5 January 2019, Human Rights Watch Asia deputy director Phil Robertson said "the Thai government... (was then) manufacturing a story that she tried to apply for a visa and it was denied... in fact, she had an onward ticket to go to Australia, she didn't want to enter Thailand in the first place". Two days later, on 7 January 2019, after international pressure, the Thai official overseeing immigration in the case, Police General Surachate Hakparn stated that "We will not send anyone to die. We will not do that. We will adhere to human rights under the rule of law." Subsequently, she was placed under the care of the United Nations High Commissioner for Refugees (UNHCR). Her passport, which had indeed included a valid Australian tourist visa, was returned to her, and formal arrangements for the establishment of her long-term asylum status began.

==== UN involvement ====
The UNHCR issued a statement on 7 January, stating that:

The Thai authorities have granted UNHCR access to Saudi national, Rahaf Mohammed Al-qunun, at Bangkok airport to assess her need for international refugee protection... For reasons of confidentiality and protection, we will not be in a position to comment on the details of the meeting.

Mohammed subsequently left the airport in the care of the agency, which later granted her refugee status and asked the Australian government to consider granting her asylum. Australian Home Affairs Minister Peter Dutton stated in a radio interview with journalists that Mohammed seemed to be safe in Thailand. With growing concerns over her safety and an unclear timeline how long Australia would take to process her application, the UNHCR referred her case to Canada and her application was processed within several hours.

=== Asylum in Canada ===
On 11 January 2019, Mohammed flew to Toronto via Seoul, having been granted asylum by Canada, as a "resettled refugee". The UNHCR said this had been arranged "on a fast-track 'emergency' basis". She was greeted at Toronto Pearson International Airport by Canadian Minister of Foreign Affairs Chrystia Freeland.

=== Reaction ===
Rahaf's family released a statement disowning her: "We are the family of [Rahaf] Mohammed al-Qunun in Saudi Arabia. We disavow the so-called 'Rahaf al-Qunun' the mentally unstable daughter who has displayed insulting and disgraceful behavior." After learning about her family disavowing her, she decided to drop al-Qunun from her name and to be known as "Rahaf Mohammed". Abdul-Ilah al-Shuaibi, Saudi Arabia's chargé d'affaires in Bangkok, was quoted as saying, in a meeting with the Thai immigration office: "When [Rahaf] first arrived in Thailand, she opened a new [Twitter account] and the followers reached about 45,000 within one day... I wish you had taken her phone, it would have been better than [taking] her passport."

Mohammed's case has been compared to those of Dina Ali Lasloom and Hakeem al-Araibi. Stephen Kalin, writing for Reuters, described Mohammed's case as triggering a new phase in the Saudi anti male-guardianship campaign.

After she was resettled in Canada, the Canadian government was accused by Saudi media of "an attempt at stirring up civil strife by inciting the Kingdom’s teenage girls to abandon social mores" in Okaz.

Some voices in the Arabic language media criticized the amount of coverage given to the case for various reasons, including the view that it gave excessive public attention to a family dispute, that the coverage would generate an excessively negative image of the condition of women in Saudi Arabia, and that it could encourage others to manipulate asylum policies.

== Publications ==
In 2022, she released a memoir, titled Rebel: My Escape From Saudi Arabia to Freedom. The memoir was received positively by The Guardian.

== Personal life ==
Rahaf Mohammed is bisexual.

== See also ==
- Human rights in Saudi Arabia
- Women's rights in Saudi Arabia
- Rana Ahmad
- Dina Ali Lasloom
- Saudi Arabia–Thailand relations
- Canada–Saudi Arabia relations
- Convention Relating to the Status of Refugees ("1951 Convention")
- Protocol Relating to the Status of Refugees ("1967 Protocol")
