= Randa Siniora =

Palestinian human rights defender

- Born: c. 1961; Palestine
- Education: University of Essex (LLM), American University in Cairo (MA)
- Occupations: human rights activist, women's rights activist
- Known for: General Director of the Women's Center For Legal Aid and Counseling (WCLAC)

Randa George Yacoub Siniora (born c. 1961) is a Palestinian human rights and women's rights activist. She has documented human rights violations in the occupied Palestinian territories for three decades, and is currently general director of the Women’s Center for Legal Aid and Counseling (WCLAC) in Jerusalem.

== Life ==
Randa Siniora studied at the University of Essex in the United Kingdom, gaining an LLM in International Human Rights Law, and at the American University in Cairo, gaining an MA degree in Sociology-Anthropology. Her MA thesis, a study of women textile workers in the West Bank, producing goods for Israeli companies, was later published by the American University. Here Siniora applied the dependency theory of Arghiri Emmanuel and Samir Amin to the Palestinian situation. To explain the relatively low levels of political and labour organization amongst women, she emphasised the social continuities of the patriarchal structures which controlled women at home and at work:

employers need not use force in order to control ... workers. Instead, they continuously try to establish a paternalistic relationship with [them]. They try to convince them that they are in the position of their fathers at the workshop, and that they are their 'supporters' and 'protectors'.

From 1987 to 1997 Siniora was Legal Researcher and Coordinator of the Women's Rights Program at the human rights organization Al-Haq. Her efforts to build consensus on the need for legal changes to protect women were interrupted by the First Intifada:

it became impossible to focus exclusively on legal and social aspects of women's rights, with human-rights violations taking place against Palestinian women every day. Now our main task is documenting those violations.

From 1997 to 2001 Siniora was Head of Networking and Advocacy at the Women's Center for Legal Aid and Counseling. From 2001 to 2005 she was General Director of Al-Haq.

From September 2007 until June 2015 Siniora was the Senior Executive Director of the Independent Commission for Human Rights (ICHR) in Palestine. In 2015 she became General Director of the Women’s Center for Legal Aid and Counseling.

In October 2018 Siniora became the first female Palestinian campaigner to address the United Nations Security Council. Siniora raised the issue of the high rate of domestic violence, and the increasing rate of femicide in the occupied territories. She also raised the broader issue of women's political exclusion:

The Israeli occupation and the resulting humanitarian crisis are deeply gendered and exacerbate existing gender inequalities. Women disproportionately endure the violence of occupation borne by all Palestinians, and often with gender-specific consequences [...] Little space has been made to integrate Palestinian women’s concerns into key political processes, including for achieving Palestinian statehood or for national reconciliation. Representation of women in key decision-making positions, including in Palestinian Authority institutions, is barely 5 percent.

== Works ==
- Palestinian Labor in a Dependent Economy: Women Workers in the West Bank Clothing Industry. Cairo Papers in Social Science, Vol. 12, Monograph 3. Cairo: American University in Cairo Press.
- 'Lobbying for a Palestinian Family Law: The Experience of the Palestinian Model Parliament: Women and Legislation'. Paper for the Conference on Islamic Family Law in the Middle East and North Africa, Amman, 2000.
