= Hanaa Edwar =

Iraqi women's rights activist

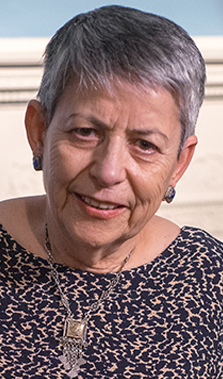
Edwar in 2017

Hanaa Edwar (born 1946) is an Iraqi women's rights activist. She is the founder and general secretary of Iraqi Al-Amal Association, and co-founder of the Iraqi Women's Network.

== Biography ==
Hanaa Edwar was born to a Christian family in the Southern city of Basra, Iraq. She earned a degree in law from Baghdad University in 1967. At age 26, Hanaa Edwar had left for Eastern Berlin to be a representative for the Iraqi Women Association at the International World Federation of Democratic Women. Edwar had spent a decade in Eastern Berlin, but was unable to return to Iraq due to Saddam Hussein's regime and was essentially exiled to live in Syria. Edwar would return to Iraq shortly after the 2003 U.S led invasion to establish her organization Al-Amal which translates to hope in english.

During her time as an advocate, she has led countless campaigns for gender equality, including efforts to advance women's role in drafting the country's new constitution in 2005. Alongside allies, she secured a minimum 25 percent women's quota in the parliament and in the local governments. She was also a member of the expert team tasked with drafting a law addressing domestic violence in Iraq.

In June 2011 she interrupted a government television conference to challenge Prime Minister Nuri Al-Maliki about the army having arrested four protestors. After she challenged the prime minister publicly, allegedly a "bullet was left in an envelope outside her office."

== Career ==
From 1981 until 1998, Edwar held the position of secretariat within the Iraqi Women's League. Ms. Edwar founded the Al-Amal Association in 1992. She currently holds the position of general secretary of the Al-Amal Association. Al-Amal focuses on building peace, promoting human rights, and sustainable development in Iraq. Al-Amal is also a place for Iraqi youth to gather. At Al-Amal, Iraqi youth have the opportunity to participate in various creative activities such as singing to help them express themselves. She has created a number of other prominent organizations, including the Arab Women's Court, formed in Beirut in 1996 with the aim of combating violence against women; the Arab NGO Network for Development, which supports, enables and empowers Arab civil societies in their quest for democracy, human rights and sustainable development; Asuda for Combating Violence against Women, based in Sulaimaniya since 2001; and Beit Khanzad, an Erbil-based shelter for women and children in 2002.

== Awards ==
Ms. Edwar was awarded the Sean MacBride Peace Prize in 2011 by the International Peace Bureau (IPB), for her contribution “to the advancement of democracy and human rights”, and her “firm stand against violence and war.” In December 2011, she was awarded by UN mission in Iraq the Appreciation certificate of Human Rights Defender in honor for her work in promoting human rights in Iraq. She won Arab Woman of the Year Award in 2013.
