= Rustom Bharucha =

Indian academic

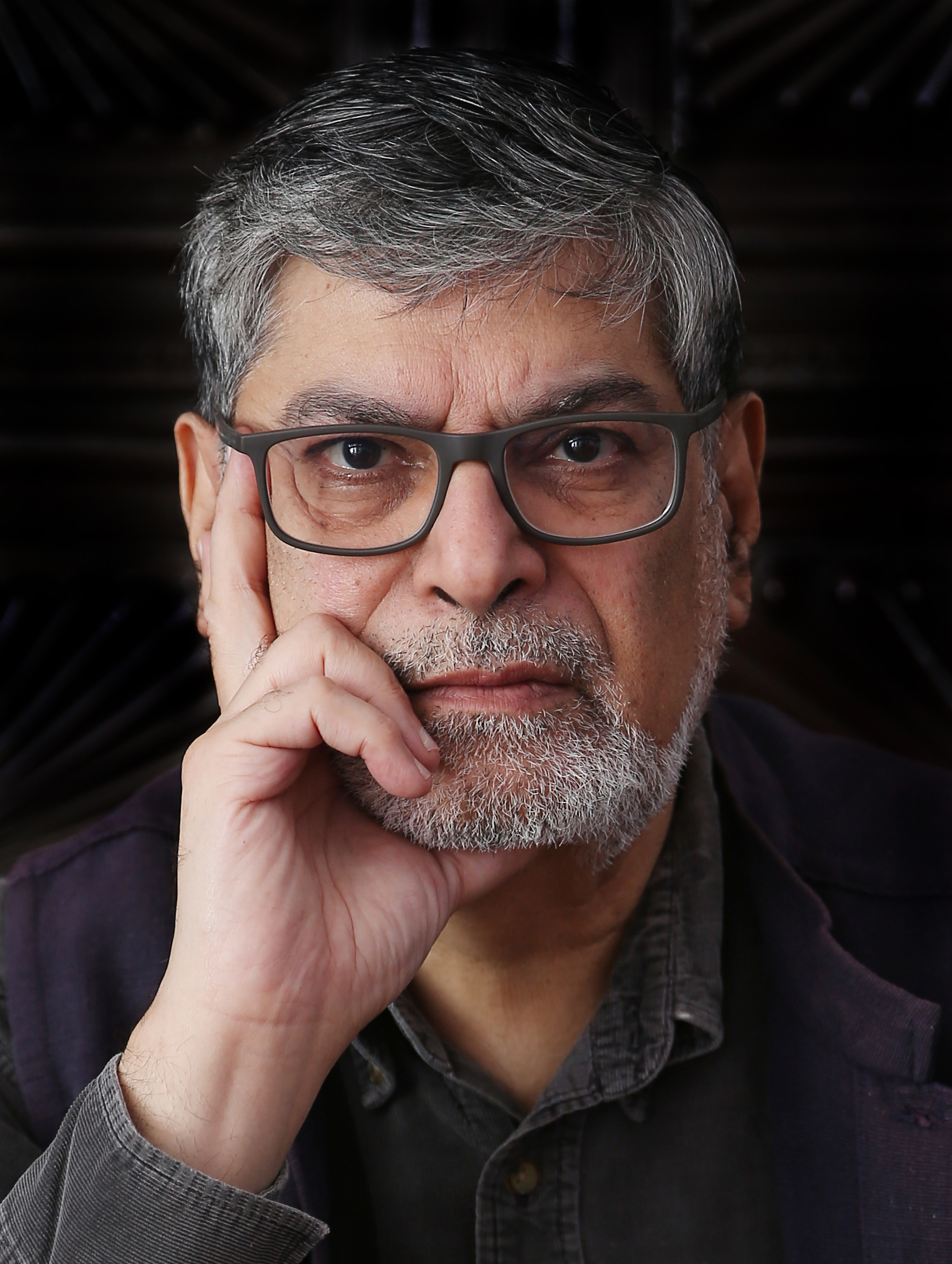
- Born: 1953 (age 72–73); Bombay (Mumbai)
- Known for: Studies of inter-culturalism, secularism, oral history and decoloniality

Academic work
- Discipline: Theater and Performance Studies. Cultural Studies

Rustom Bharucha (born 1953 in Bombay) is a writer, director and dramaturg based in Kolkata, India. He is a Corresponding Fellow of the British Academy and a retired Professor of Theatre and Performance Studies which he taught in the School of Arts and Aesthetics at Jawaharlal Nehru University, New Delhi, India, between 2012 and 2018.

== Training and Work ==
Trained as a dramaturg at the Yale School of Drama between 1977 and 1980, Bharucha received his doctorate from Yale, in Dramatic Criticism, in 1981. Over the years, he has published a number of books including Theatre and the World (1993), The Question of Faith (1993), Chandralekha: Woman/Dance/Resistance (1995), In the Name of the Secular (1999), The Politics of Cultural Practice (2000), Rajasthan: An Oral History (2003), Another Asia: Rabindranath Tagore and Okakura Tenshin (2006) and Terror and Performance (2014). His publication, Terror and Performance, was researched while he was a Fellow at The International Research Center “Interweaving Performance Cultures” in Berlin, Germany, between 2010 and 2012. More recently, he has published Performing the Ramayana Tradition: Enactments, Interpretations, and Arguments (2021), co-edited with Paula Richman, and The Second Wave: Reflections on the Pandemic through Photography, Performance and Public Culture (2022). During the first phase of the coronavirus pandemic in 2020, he produced a 9-episode video-lecture on Theatre and the Coronavirus.

A leading interlocutor in the area of intercultural performance, both at theoretical and practical levels, he has also attempted to redefine the relationship between culture and development through a number of workshops with marginalized communities in India, the Philippines, Brazil and South Africa on issues relating to land and memory, the politics of touch, re-enactments of history, and social transformation.

A former advisor of the Prince Claus Fund for Culture and Development in the Netherlands, he has served as a consultant for the Arts Council in Ireland on cultural diversity in the arts, in 2008, as well as for Ford Foundation on its interdisciplinary and multicultural Artography project, in the United States, in 2007. Between 2007 and 2009, he has also worked as the Project Director of Arna-Jharna: The Desert Museum of Rajasthan, which is devoted to the study of traditional knowledge systems, and as the Festival Director of the Ramayana Festival at the Adishakti Laboratory for Theatre Research in Puducherry, India, between 2010 and 2011.

== Bibliography ==
- Rehearsals of Revolution: The Political Theater of Bengal. University of Hawaii Press. Honolulu. Paperback Ed. by Seagull Books.1983. ISBN 978-0824808457
- Theatre of Kanhailal. 'Pebet' and 'Memoirs of Africa' . Seagull Books. Calcutta. 1990. Reprinted in 1998. ISBN 978-8170460947
- Theatre and the World: Performance and the Politics of Culture. Manohar Publishers. New Delhi.1990. Reprinted by Routledge. London. 1993. ISBN 978-0415092166
- The Question of Faith (Tracts for the Times). Ed. by S. Gopal and Romila Thapar. Orient Longman. New Delhi. 1993. ISBN 978-0863113925
- Chandralekha: Woman/Dance/Resistance. Harper Collins, New Delhi. 1995, Paperback Ed. 1997. ISBN 978-8172232542
- In the Name of the Secular: Contemporary Cultural Activism in India. Oxford University Press. New Delhi. 1998. Paperback Ed. 1999. ISBN 978-0195648898
- The Politics of Cultural Practice: Thinking Through Theatre in an Age of Globalization. Wesleyan University Press. 2000. Oxford University Press. 2001. Paperback Ed. 2003. ISBN 978-0819564245
- Rajasthan—An Oral History: Conversations with Komal Kothari. Penguin Books. New Delhi. 2003. ISBN 978-0143029595
- Another Asia: Rabindranath Tagore and Okakura Tenshin. Oxford University Press, New Delhi. 2006. ISBN 978-0195682854
- Terror and Performance. Routledge, London and New York, 2014. Co-published by Tulika Books. New Delhi, 2014. ISBN 978-1138014275
- Performing the Ramayana Tradition: Enactments, Interpretations, and Arguments. Co-Ed. with Paula Richman. Oxford University Press, New York. 2021. ISBN 978-0197552506
- The Second Wave: Reflections on the Pandemic through Photography, Performance and Public Culture. Seagull Books. Kolkata. Distributed by The University of Chicago Press. 2022. ISBN 978-1803090757
