= David Berger (theologian) =

German theologian, author and gay activist (born 1968)

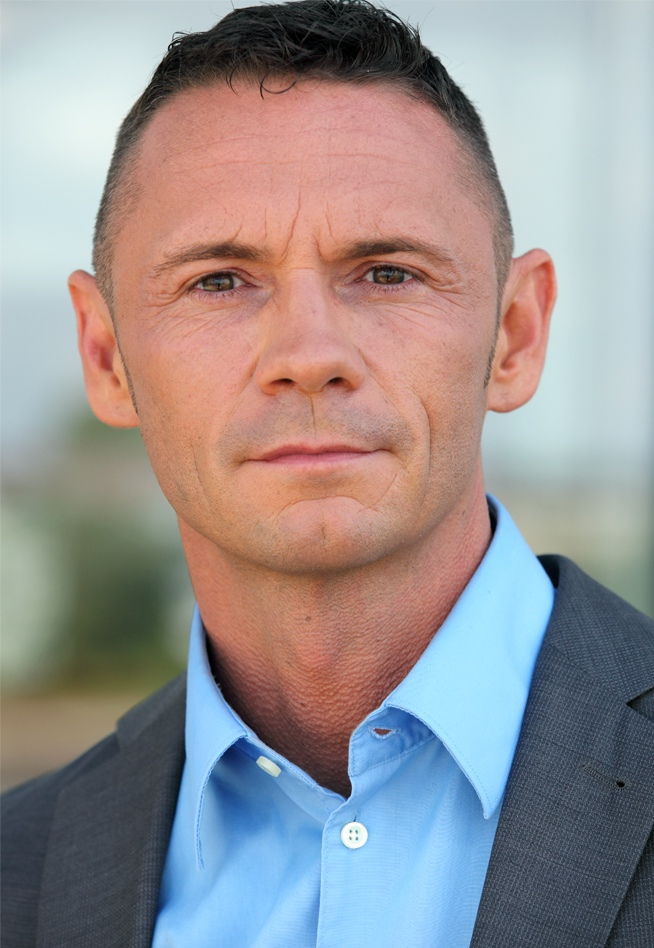
- Berger in 2011
- Born: 8 March 1968 (age 58); Würzburg, Germany
- Occupations: Theologian; author; activist

David Berger (born 8 March 1968 in Würzburg) is a German Roman Catholic theologian, author and right-wing political activist (AfD, formerly CDU).

== Biography ==
From 1991 to 1998, Berger studied philosophy, Catholic theology and German language and literature in Würzburg, Cologne and Dortmund. Berger is a German neo-Thomist and took a critical stance to the work of Karl Rahner. Berger was a professor of the Pontifical Academy of St. Thomas Aquinas in Rome and also worked as a religious education teacher at a high school in Erftstadt, Germany. The Catholic Church has since revoked his licence to teach.

In 2010, Berger's homosexuality was publicized. He then published his book Der heilige Schein: Als schwuler Theologe in der katholischen Kirche ("The holy appearance: Being a gay theologian in the Catholic church"), in which he claimed that 20 to 40 percent of the Catholic clergy were homosexual.

He subsequently was the editor-in-chief of the gay periodical Männer (men) (Berlin) from 2013 to 2015. He increasingly took a critical stance towards Islam and immigration, which in February 2015 led to him being dismissed from that position and to Berger distancing himself from the German LGBT movement.

Berger became an anti-Islam and anti free press blogger. He begann to support the German anti-migration right-wing extremist party AfD. Berger supported the up-coming Neue Rechte YouTube and social media Influencerin Naomi Seibt. He became a member of the board of trustees of the AfD-affiliated Desiderius Erasmus Foundation.

He was member of CDU. In March 2024 he became member of AfD.

== Blog Philosophia Perennis ==
His blog was active in June 2016 and has become the leading medium in circles of the so-called "alternative media", i.e. privately operated right-wing radical and conspiracy theory opinion media. According to Alexa, "Philosophia Perennis" had between 80,000 and 190,000 daily visitors in 2024. The articles from "Philosophia Perennis" are shared up to hundreds of times on social networks such as Twitter and Facebook.

== Works by Berger ==
- Natur und Gnade in systematischer Theologie und Religionspädagogik von der Mitte des 19. Jahrhunderts bis zur Gegenwart. S. Roderer. Regensburg 1998. ISBN 3-89073-980-6.
- Thomas von Aquin und die Liturgie. Ed. Thomisticae. Cologne 2000. ISBN 3-89811-286-1 (translation in English and French).
- Thomismus. Große Leitmotive der thomistischen Synthese und ihre Aktualität für die Gegenwart. Ed. Thomisticae. Cologne 2001. ISBN 3-8311-1620-2.
- Thomas von Aquins "Summa theologiae". Wissenschaftliche Buchgesellschaft. Darmstadt 2004. ISBN 3-534-17456-9.
- Was ist ein Sakrament? Der hl. Thomas von Aquin und die Sakramente im allgemeinen. Franz Schmitt. Siegburg 2004. ISBN 3-87710-278-6.
- Thomas von Aquin begegnen. Sankt-Ulrich. Augsburg 2002. ISBN 3-929246-77-5 (translation in Hungarian: Budapest 2008).
- In der Schule des hl. Thomas von Aquin. Studien zur Geschichte des Thomismus. nova et vetera. Bonn 2005. ISBN 3-936741-30-1.
- Der heilige Schein: Als schwuler Theologe in der katholischen Kirche. 2010. ISBN 978-3-550-08855-1.
- Editor:
  - Karl Rahner – Kritische Annäherungen. Franz Schmitt. Siegburg 2004. ISBN 3-87710-280-8.
  - together with Jörgen Vijgen: Thomistenlexikon. nova et vetera. Bonn 2006. ISBN 3-936741-37-9.
