= 1996 in Norway =

- Centuries: 18th; 19th; 20th; 21st
- Decades: 1970s; 1980s; 1990s; 2000s; 2010s
- See also: List of years in Norway

Events in the year 1996 in Norway.

== Incumbents ==
- Monarch – Harald V.
- Prime Minister – Gro Harlem Brundtland (Labour Party) until 25 October, Thorbjørn Jagland (Labour Party)

== Events ==
- 15 January – Nordic Biker War – An explosive device is thrown at the headquarters of the Hells Angels hangaround club Screwdrivers MC in Hamar, Norway.
- 18 January – Nordic Biker War – The Customizers' clubhouse in Oslo is struck with a petrol bomb.
- 26 January – Nordic Biker War – Seven shots are fired at a car carrying several Outlaws members outside the Customizers' clubhouse in Alnabru, Oslo.
- 27 February – Arbeider-Avisa ceases publication.
- 10 March – Nordic Biker War – The Hells Angels carried out a twin attack on Bandidos members at Copenhagen Airport and Oslo Airport, Fornebu.
- 29 August – Operafjell Accident: Vnukovo Airlines Flight 2801, a Tupolev Tu-154, crashes into a mountain on Spitsbergen, an island in the Norwegian archipelago of Svalbard, killing all 141 on board.
- 3 September – Hijacked Hemus Air Flight 7081 lands with 8 crew members at Oslo Airport, Gardermoen at 20:04 UTC+1.
- 21 September – Såner Station in Vestby, Norway closes.
- 25 October – Gro Harlem Brundtland resigns as Prime Minister of Norway for the third time.
- 25 October – Jagland's Cabinet was appointed.
- 30 October – Nordic Biker War – A car bomb explodes outside the Hells Angels headquarters in Oslo.
- 1 December –

== Popular culture ==
=== Sports ===
- 19–24 February – The World Ski Orienteering Championships is held in Lillehammer.
- 23 March – Sportkanalen launches.
- 19 July–4 August – Norway at the 1996 Summer Olympics.
- 30 December – Sportkanalen closes.
- The ice hockey team Viking IK goes bankrupt after their 1996 season.

=== Music ===
- 18 May 18 – 1996 Eurovision Song Contest is hosted in Oslo. Norwegian entrant Elisabeth Andreassen finished in second place with the song "I evighet" and had 114 points.
- Norwegian rock band Vagabond splits up due to the reformation of TNT.
- The September When splits up.

=== Literature ===
- Øystein Lønn is awarded the Nordic Council Literature Prize for Hva skal vi gjøre i dag og andre noveller.
- Vita Brevis: A Letter to St Augustine by Jostein Gaarder is published.
- Don't Look Back (Norwegian: Se deg ikke tilbake!) by Karin Fossum is published.
- Brødre i blodet by Ingvar Ambjørnsen is published.
- Naïve. Super. by Erlend Loe is published.
- Melancholy II by Jon Fosse is published.

=== Television ===
- ZTV Norway closes down after an unsuccessful year.

== Notable births ==
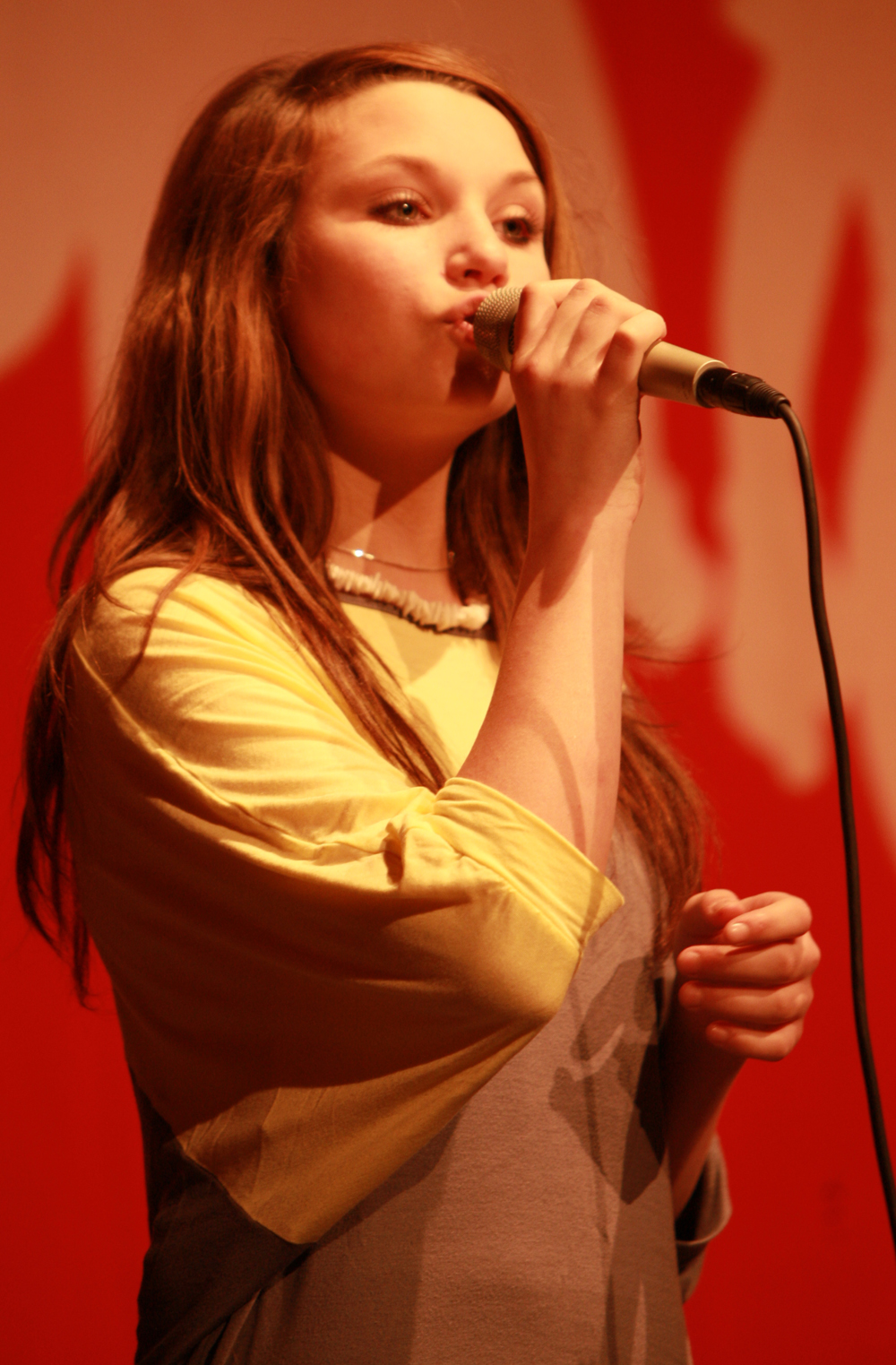
Nora Foss al-Jabri

- 4 January – Lene Retzius, athlete
- 8 January – Niklas Castro, footballer
- 22 January – André Sødlund, footballer
- 23 January – Varg Støvland, footballer.
- 25 January – Lotte Miller, triathlete.
- 29 January – Nora Foss al-Jabri, singer
- 30 January – Kristian Østby, ice hockey player.

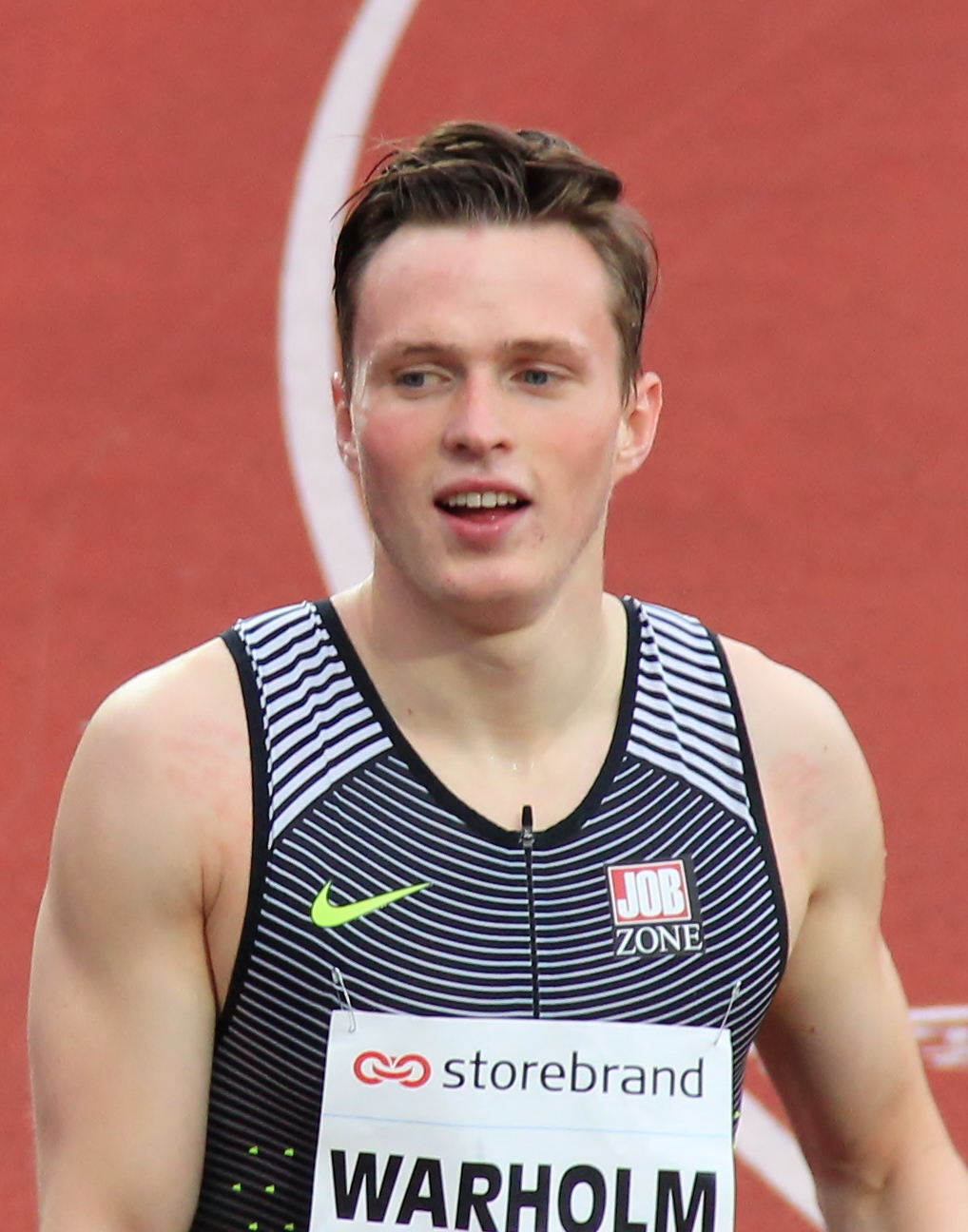
Karsten Warholm

- 7 February – Sondre Rossbach, footballer
- 13 February – Vebjørn Hoff, footballer
- 15 February – Per Kristian Bråtveit, footballer
- 15 February – Synne Jensen, footballer
- 19 February – Tore Navrestad, BMX rider
- 19 February – Lars-Jørgen Salvesen, footballer
- 25 February – Jonathan Lindseth, footballer
- 26 February – Runar Espejord, footballer
- 26 February – Bjørn Inge Utvik, footballer
- 28 February – Karsten Warholm, athlete
- 3 March – Tor André Skimmeland Aasheim, footballer
- 10 March – Aslak Fonn Witry, footballer
- 14 March – Moa Högdahl, handball player
- 20 March – Cecilie Fiskerstrand, footballer
- 21 March – Aurora Mikalsen, footballer
- 24 March – Karina Sævik, footballer.
- 8 April – Sander Øverjordet, handball player
- 10 April – Fabian Wilkens Solheim, alpine skier
- 13 April – Kristoffer Halvorsen, cyclist
- 14 April – Rasmus Martinsen, footballer
- 14 April – Vajebah Sakor, footballer
- 19 April – Fredrik Michalsen, cross-country skier
- 22 April – Ivan Näsberg, footballer
- 24 April – Oda Maria Hove Bogstad, footballer
- 24 April – Henrik Furuseth, racing driver
- 1 May – Gustav Iden, triathlete
- 3 May – Morten Konradsen, footballer
- 5 May – Morten Thorsby, footballer
- 11 May – Tobias Drevland Lund, politician.
- 18 May – Josefine Frida Pettersen, actress
- 23 May – Anna Bjørke Kallestad, handball player
- 28 May – Mathias Normann, footballer
- 29 May – Halvor Egner Granerud, ski jumper
- 30 May – Åse Kristin Ask Bakke, politician.

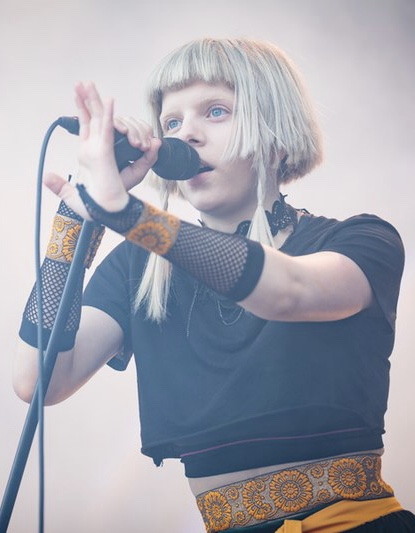
Aurora Aksnes

- 3 June – Elise Skinnehaugen, handball player
- 6 June – Kristoffer Madsen, cyclist
- 15 June – Aurora Aksnes, singer and songwriter
- 22 June – Kristian Sæverås, handball player
- 29 June – Kristin Lysdahl, alpine skier
- 29 June – Alexandra Rotan, singer
- 3 July – Maria Hjertner, handball player
- 6 July – Sigrid Schjetne, murder victim (d. 2012)
- 12 July – Sverre Bjørkkjær, footballer
- 15 July – Iver Fossum, footballer
- 17 July – Ulrik Yttergård Jenssen, footballer
- 19 July – Sheriff Sinyan, footballer
- 21 July – Mikael Ingebrigtsen, footballer
- 21 July – Viljar Myhra, footballer
- 21 July – Markus Nakkim, footballer
- 23 July – Alexandra Andresen, heiress
- 23 July – Maria Mollestad, windsurfer
- 28 July – Rasmus Tiller, cyclist

=== August ===
- 4 August – Moses Mawa, footballer
- 4 August – Mohamed Ofkir, footballer
- 6 August – Kristine Bjørdal Leine, footballer
- 8 August – Syver Wærsted, cyclist
- 13 August – Christian Bull, ice hockey player
- 13 August – Mattis Stenshagen, cross-country skier
- 30 August – Fredrik Pallesen Knudsen, footballer
- 31 August – Robin Pedersen, ski jumper

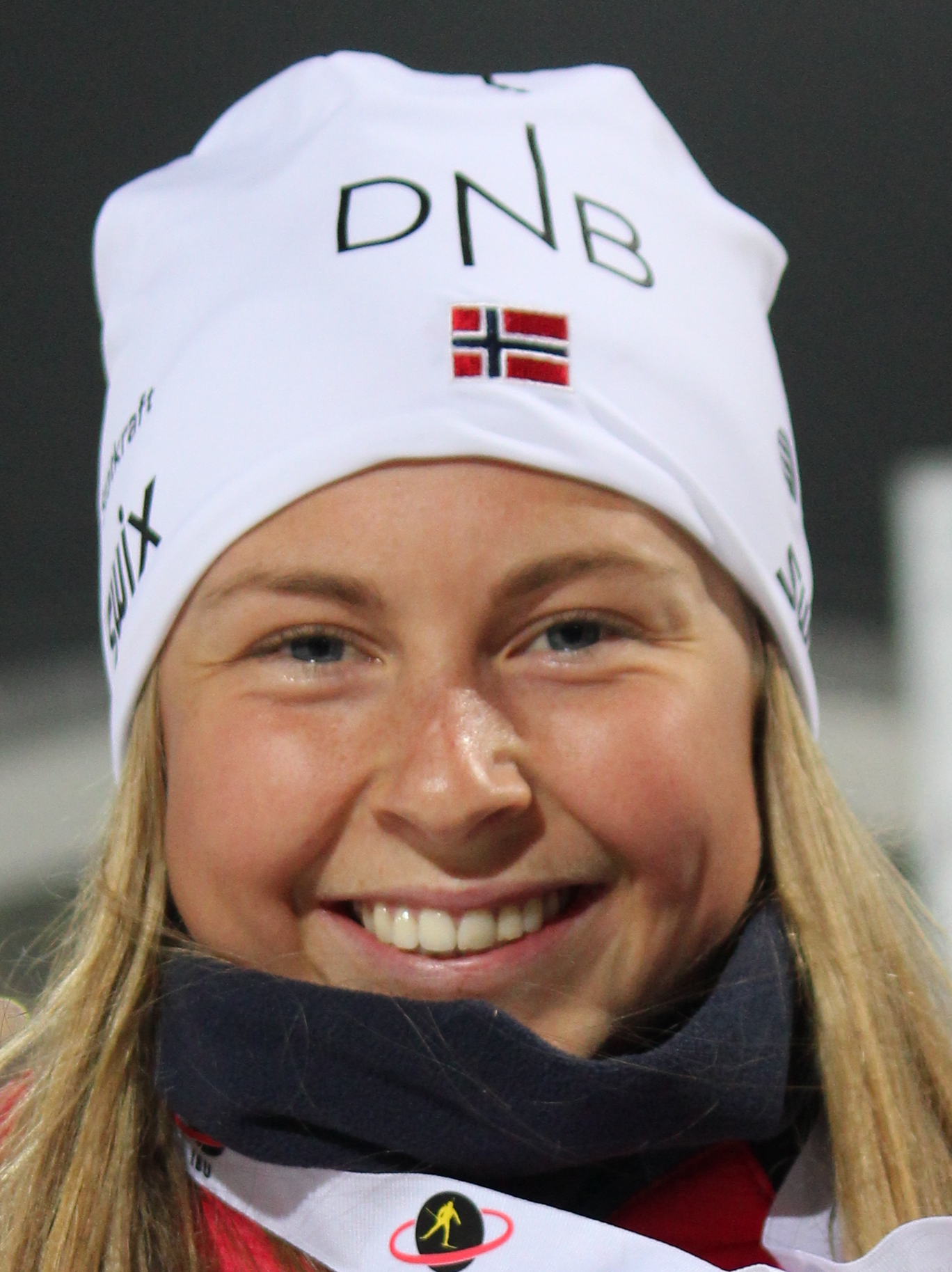
Ingrid Landmark Tandrevold

- 5 September – Sigrid Raabe, singer and songwriter
- 14 September – Zymer Bytyqi, footballer (born in Belgium)
- 15 September – Fredrik Michalsen, footballer
- 17 September – Herman Kleppa, footballer
- 20 September – Mathias Skjold, cyclist
- 22 September – Bent Sørmo, footballer
- 23 September – Ingrid Landmark Tandrevold, biathlete
- 28 September – Erik Resell, racing cyclist
- 29 September
  - Lotta Udnes Weng, cross-country skier
  - Tiril Udnes Weng, cross-country skier

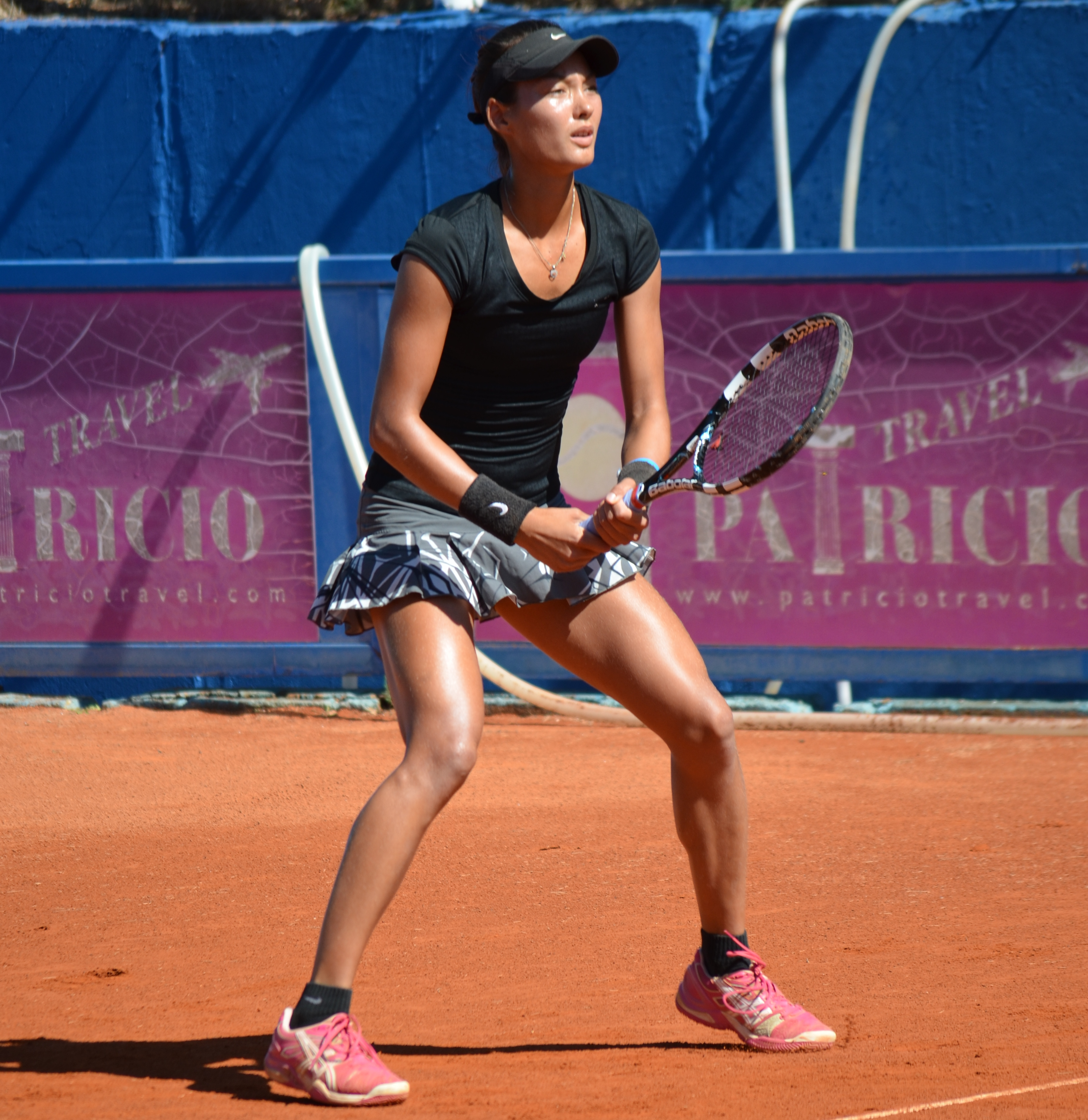
Melanie Stokke

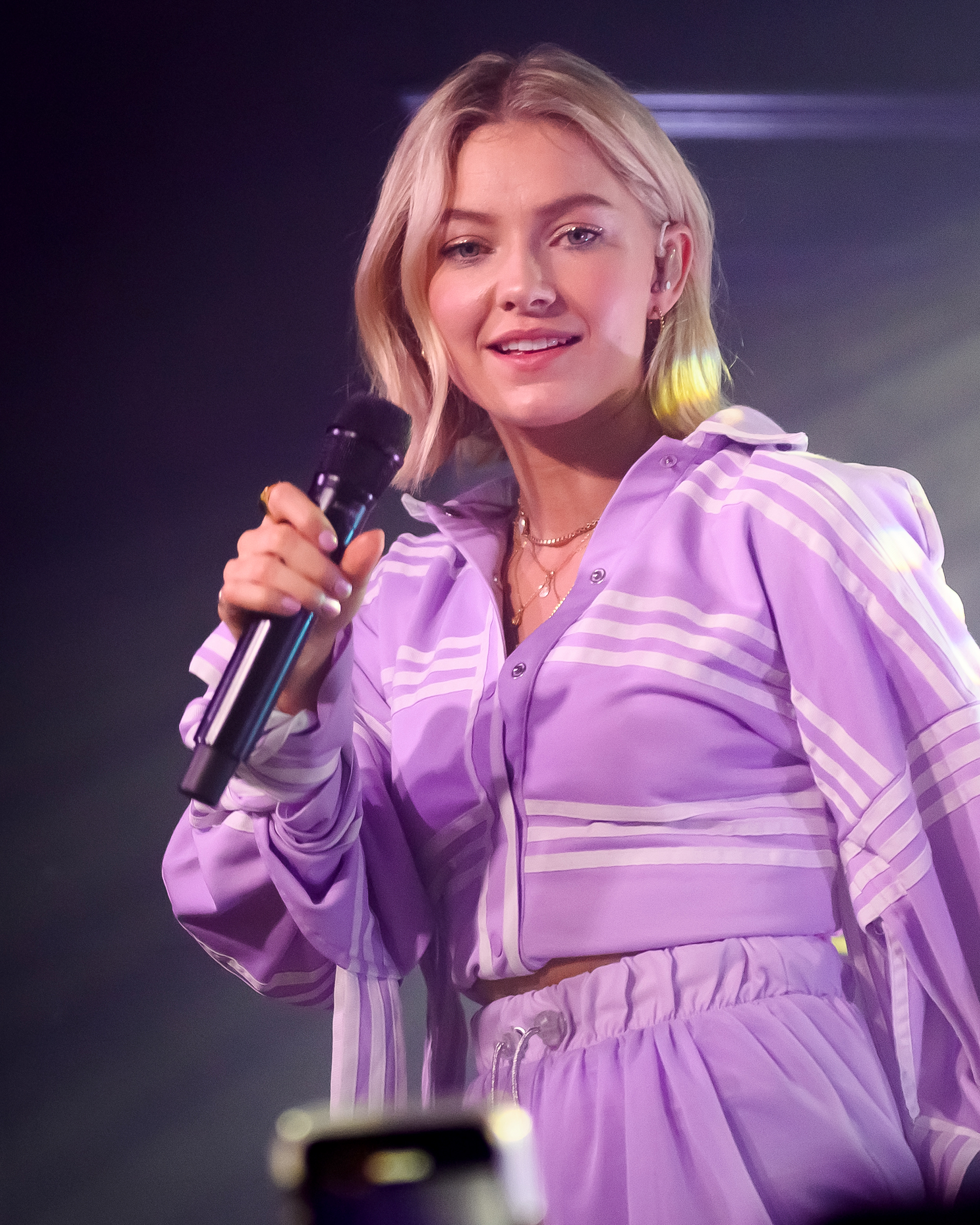
Astrid S

- 1 October – Melanie Stokke, tennis player
- 9 October
  - Henrik Christiansen, swimmer.
  - Tonje Haug Lerstad, handball player
  - Sondre Ringen, ski jumper.
- 10 October – Fredrik Flo, footballer
- 13 October – Jonathan Quarcoo, athlete
- 16 October – Ludvig Hoff, ice hockey player
- 20 October – Henrik Fagerli Rukke, speed skater
- 22 October – Johannes Høsflot Klæbo, cross-country skier.
- 29 October – Astrid S, singer, songwriter and model
- 30 October – Vetle Langedahl, politician.
- 1 November – Alexander Betten Hansen, footballer
- 4 November – Adelén Steen, singer
- 9 November – Kevin Gulliksen, handball player
- 12 November – Sunniva Næs Andersen, handball player
- 24 November – Thea Louise Stjernesund, alpine skier
- 5 December – Solveig Skaugvoll Foss, politician
- 27 December – Timon Haugan, alpine skier
- 26 December – Erik Hægstad, mountain biker

Full date missing

- Thea Sofie Loch Næss, actress

== Notable deaths ==
=== January ===
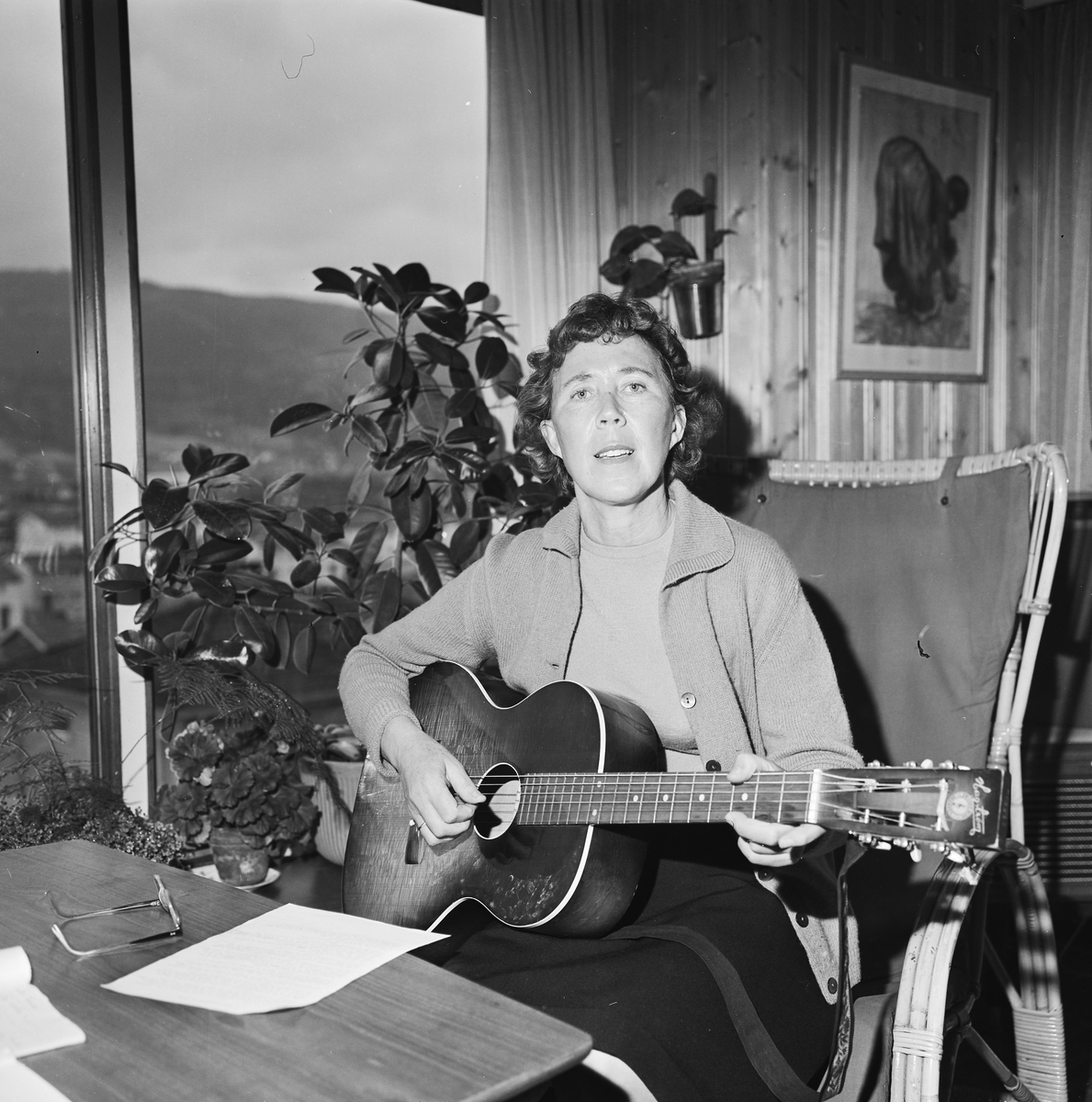
Kirsten Langbo in 1964

- 5 January – Knut Løfsnes, politician (born 1918).
- 8 January – Olaf Knudson, politician (b. 1915)
- 13 January – Johannes Kvittingen, bacteriologist and resistance member (b. 1906)
- 15 January – Nils Jørgensen, fencer (b. 1911)
- 18 January – Kirsten Langbo, children's writer, singer-songwriter, radio entertainer and puppeteer (b. 1909).
- 24 January – Sigurd Bratlie, church leader (b. 1905)
- 20 January – Bente Grønli, para-athlete (b. 1956)
- 25 January – Arnold Juklerød, activist (b. 1925)
- 25 January – Sigmund Gjesdal, politician (b. 1929)

=== February ===
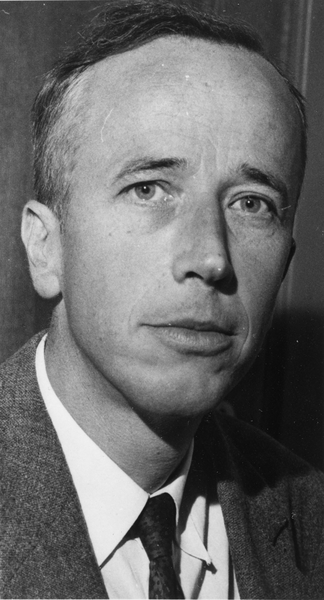
Knut Blom

- 4 February – Sigmund Moren, author (b. 1913).
- 6 February – Knut Blom, judge (b. 1916)
- 13 February – Willy Arne Wold, politician (b. 1929)

=== March ===
- 1 March – Hårek Ludvig Hansen, politician (b. 1901)
- 1 March – Thorleif Vangen, cross-country skier (b. 1920)
- 4 March – Knut Skaaluren, politician (b. 1916)
- 11 March – Thorleif Olsen, footballer (b. 1921)
- 14 March – Maj Sønstevold, Swedish composer (b. 1917)
- 19 March – Erik Egeland, journalist and art critic (b. 1921)
- 21 March – Sverre Sørsdal, boxer (b. 1900)
- 27 March – Bjarne Vik, politician (b. 1916)
- 28 March – Jacob R. Kuhnle, newspaper editor (b. 1907)
- 30 March – Hjalmar Hvam, Nordic skier and inventor (b. 1902)

=== April ===
- 2 April – Jens Henrik Nordlie, military officer (b.1910).
- 10 April – Hans Beck, ski jumper (b. 1911)
- 10 April – Gunnar Konsmo, speed skater (b. 1922)
- 11 April – Trygve Brodahl, cross-country skier (b. 1904)
- 11 April – Caspar Stephansen, civil servant (b. 1923)
- 16 April – Rolf Haugland, politician (b. 1925)
- 18 April – Richard August Riekeles, barrister (b. 1904)
- 23 April – Edvard Kaurin Barth, resistance member and zoologist (b.1913).
- 23 April – Gunnar Henningsmoen, palaeontologist (b. 1919)
- 26 April – Anders Hauge, politician (b. 1903)

=== May ===
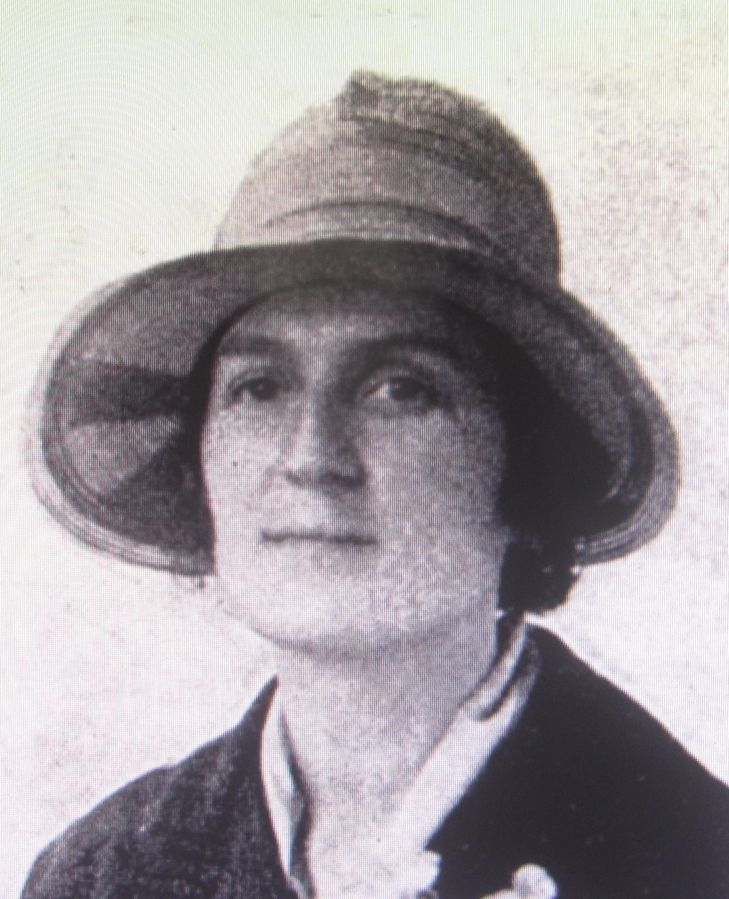
Kirsten Sand

- 1 May – Arvid Johansen, politician (b. 1910)
- 5 May – Bjarne Hervik, politician (b. 1911)
- 12 May – Kirsten Sand, architect (b. 1895)
- 20 May – Kristian Lien, politician (d. 1915)

=== June ===
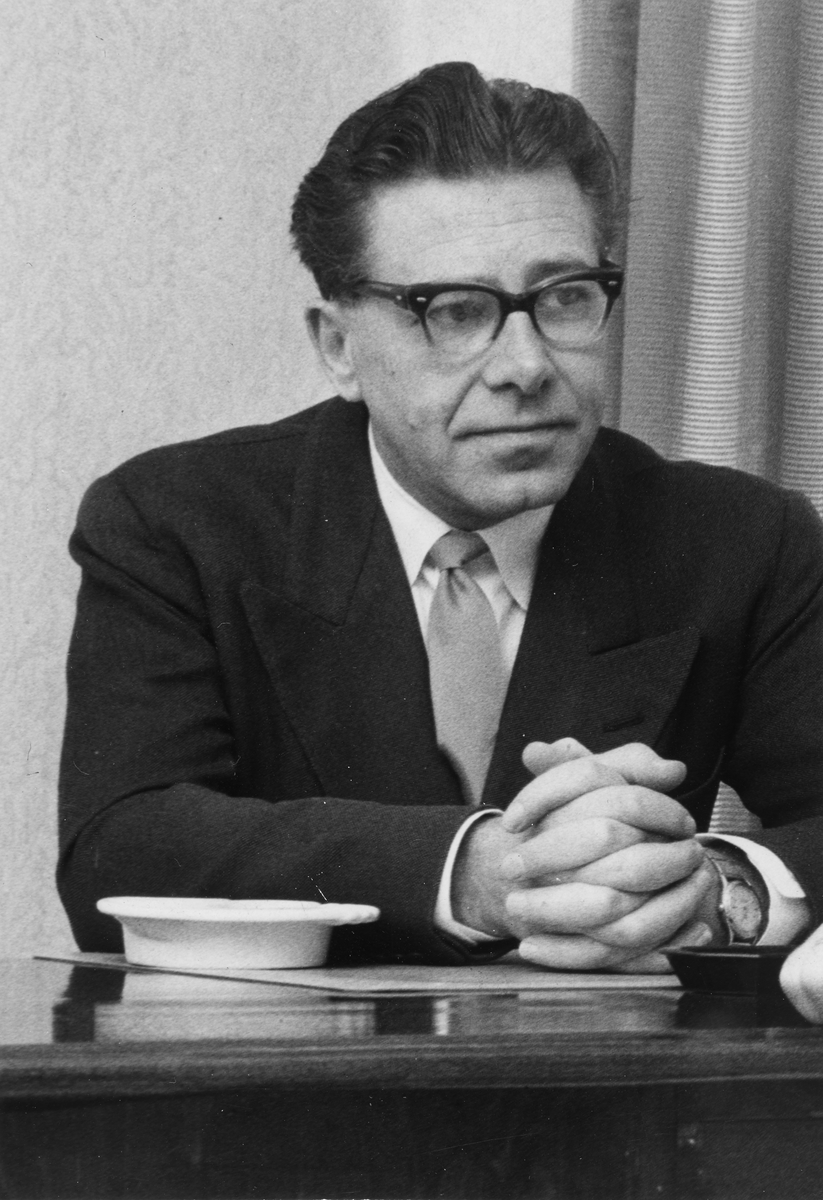
Victor Borg

- 11 June – Kari Berggrav, photographer (b. 1911)
- 15 June – Petra Mohn, politician (b. 1911)
- 17 June – Erling Kaas, athlete (b. 1915, died in France)
- 27 June – Victor Borg, physician and writer (b. 1916).
- 28 June – Birger Breivik, politician (b. 1912)
- 28 June – Ola Solum, film director (b. 1943)

=== July ===
- 1 July – Einar Hovdhaugen, politician (b. 1908)
- 2 July – Arvid Brodersen, sociologist (b. 1904).
- 2 July – Olaf Kolstad, businessman (b. 1920)
- 4 July – Stein Åros, politician (b. 1952)
- 4 July – Magnhild Hagelia, politician (b. 1904)
- 13 July – Karen Simensen, figure skater (b. 1907)
- 15 July – Hans Svendsgård, politician (b. 1937)
- 16 July – Jan Krogh Jensen, Danish mobster (b. 1958)
- 19 July – Sverre Wilberg, actor (b. 1929)
- 20 July – Bernt Østerkløft, Nordic combined skier (b. 1906)
- 21 July – Inger Jacobsen, singer and actress (b. 1923)
- 23 July – Georg Lous Jr., barrister (b. 1916)
- 25 July – Nini Haslund Gleditsch, activist (b. 1908).
- 26 July – Olav Totland, politician (b. 1904)

=== August ===
- 1 August – Else Høst, literary historian (b. 1908)
- 5 August – Helge Kvamme, jurist and businessman (b. 1938)
- 20 August – Bjarne Øverhaug, journalist and politician (b. 1927)
- 22 August – Kjell Borgen, politician (b. 1939)
- 23 August – Sverre Holm, sociologist (b.1910).
- 23 August – Øivind Holmsen, footballer (b. 1912).

=== September ===
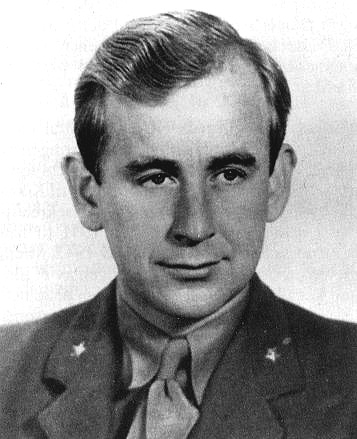
Max Manus

- 3 September – Erling Christie, author (b. 1928)
- 4 September – Gunvor Blich, politician (b. 1908)
- 13 September – Thorvald Wilhelmsen, athlete (b. 1912)
- 14 September – Odin Hansen, politician (b. 1918)
- 20 September – Max Manus, resistance member and memoirist (b. 1914)
- 25 September – Helge Jakobsen, politician (b. 1901)
- 25 September – Arne Lie, civil servant and politician (b. 1927)
- 27 September – Johnny Larntvet, ice hockey player (b. 1916)

=== October ===
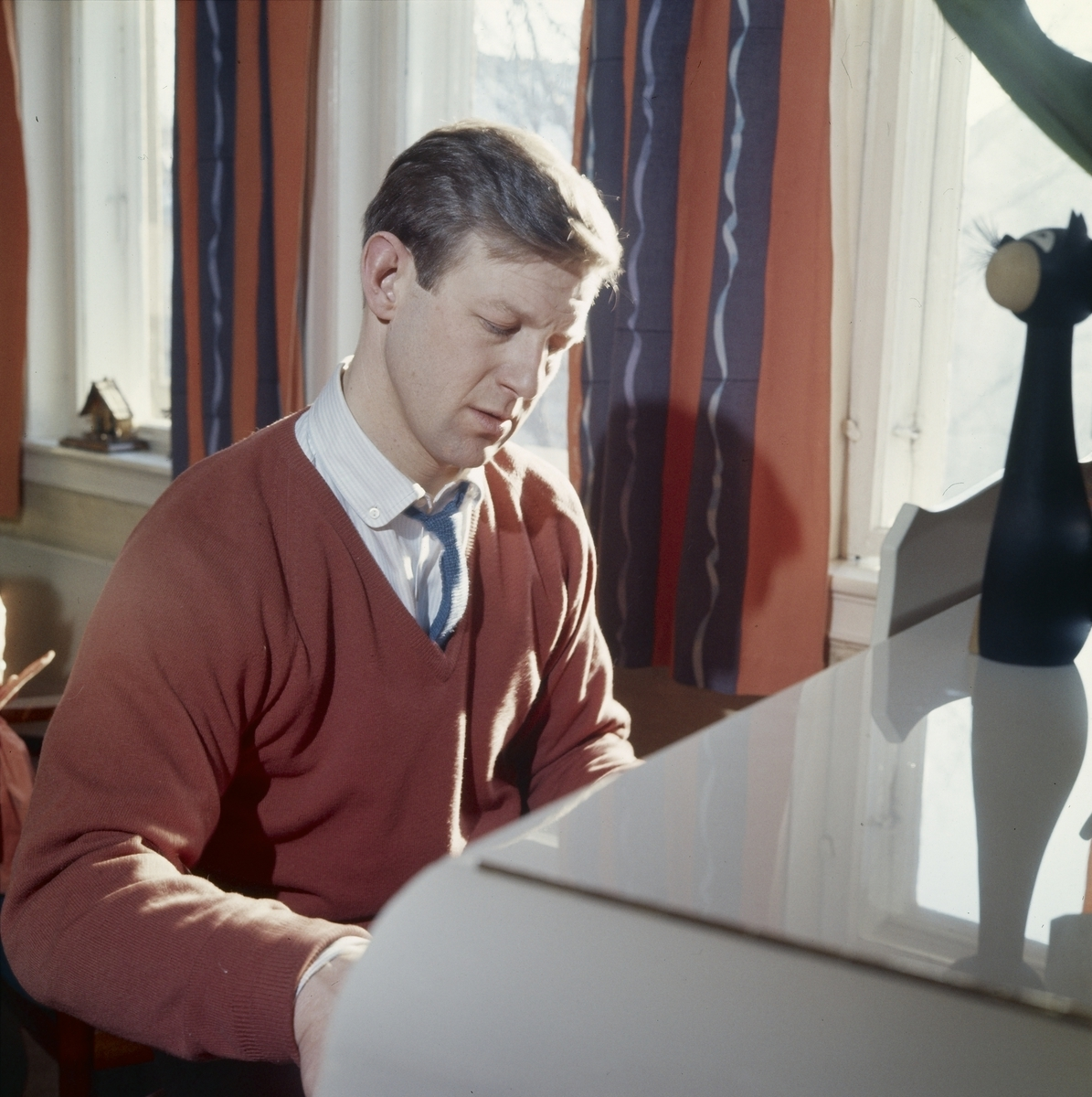
Per Asplin

- 1 October – Carl Fredrik Engelstad, writer and theatre director (b. 1915).
- 9 October – Per Asplin, actor (b. 1928)
- 11 October – Rolf Wideröe, physicist (b. 1902)
- 11 October – Lasse Glomm, film director (b. 1944)
- 15 October – Leo Eitinger, psychiatrist, author and educator (b. 1912)
- 16 October – Einar Johansen, engineer and resistance member (b. 1915)
- 25 October – Eva Lund Haugen, author and editor (b. 1907)
- 25 October – Solveig Gunbjørg Jacobsen, first person born and raised in South Georgia (b. 1913)
- 27 October – Kaare Melhuus, politician (b. 1915)

=== November ===
- 2 November – Egil Eriksen, educator and politician (b. 1909)
- 3 November – Martin Siem, businessman and resistance member (b. 1915).
- 4 November – Kjetil Mårdalen, Nordic combined skier (b. 1925)
- 5 November – Arne Hendriksen, ceramicist and opera singer (b. 1911)
- 7 November – Sverre Kolterud, Nordic combined skier (b. 1908)
- 13 November – Katja Medbøe actress (b. 1945)
- 20 November – Jens Boyesen, diplomat and politician (b.1920).
- 23 November – Torstein Olav Kuvaas, politician (b. 1908)
- 23 November – Annar Poulsson, businessman (b. 1911)
- 29 November – Olav Hestenes, barrister (b. 1930).

=== December ===
- 5 December – Adolf Bredo Stabell, diplomat (b. 1908)
- 5 December – John Engh, architect (b. 1915)
- 11 December – Kirsten Myklevoll, politician (b. 1928)
- 14 December – Jan Didriksen, jurist and businessman (b. 1917).
- 24 December – Carsten Boysen, architect (b. 1906)
- 25 December – Olav Tendeland, barrister and sports administrator (b. 1904)
- 29 December – Johan Trandem, athlete (b. 1899)
- 30 December – Erik Heiberg, sailor (b. 1916)

=== Full date missing ===
- Jan Greve, psychiatrist (b. 1907)
- Kjell Henriksen, scientist (b.1938)
- Jac Jacobsen, designer (b. 1901)
- Gudmund Seland, resistance member and newspaper editor (b. 1907)
