= Lous =

Lous is a surname. Notable people with the surname include:

- Andreas Lous (1728–1797), Danish naval officer
- Georg Lous (1878–1949), Norwegian barrister and businessman
- Georg Lous Jr. (1916–1996), Norwegian barrister
- Karl Lous (1847–1928), Norwegian barrister
- Kristian Lous (1875–1941), Norwegian astronomer
