= Even Lange =

Norwegian economic historian (born 1946)

Even Lange (born 5 June 1946) is a Norwegian economic historian.

He was born in Oslo as the son of politician Halvard Manthey Lange (1902–1970) and teacher Aase Monsen (1911–1979). On the maternal side he was a nephew of Randi and Per Monsen, and on the paternal side he was a nephew of August Lange, Carl Viggo Manthey Lange and a grandson of Christian Lous Lange. He has married twice.

Influenced by Joseph Schumpeter, his field is economic history. He worked at the National Archival Services of Norway from 1979 to 1988, and from 1988 to 2000 he led the Centre for Business History at the BI Norwegian Business School. He worked at the Norwegian Institute for Social Research for two years before being appointed as a professor at the University of Oslo in 2002. From 1995 to 2002 he was a member of the Council of the European Business History Association. His first major work was Treforedlingens epoke 1895–1970, volume four of the work Fra Linderud til Eidsvold Værk, which was released in 1985 and earned him the doctorate in 1987. In 1997 he published Samling om felles mål 1935–1970, volume eleven of Aschehougs Norgeshistorie on general Norwegian history. He is a member of the Norwegian Academy of Science and Letters.
