= Samuel William Manthey =

Norwegian politician

Samuel William Manthey (1774 – 4 August 1815) was a Norwegian jurist and politician.

He was elected to the first session of the Parliament of Norway in 1814, representing the constituency of Smaalenenes Amt. He was a district stipendiary magistrate (sorenskriver) and stipendiary magistrate (byfoged) by profession.

Together with Elisabeth Antonette de Stockfleth (1777–1857) he had the son August Christian Manthey (1811–1880), a notable politician and writer, who married a daughter of Jacob Nielsen. Samuel William Manthey was also the son-in-law of Thomas Rosing de Stockfleth. Another son, Ludvig Johan Carl Manthey (1809–1875), married another daughter of Jacob Nielsen. They had the daughter Bertha Manthey (1867–1947), who married Christian Lous Lange, and mothered Halvard, Carl Viggo and August Lange.
