= Georg Lous =

Norwegian barrister and businessperson

Georg Fredrik Hallager Lous (13 March 1878 – 17 February 1949) was a Norwegian barrister and businessperson.

== Personal life ==
He was born in Kristiania as the son of Attorney General Karl Lous (1847–1928) and Karoline Mathilde Zetlitz (1844–1926). He was the brother of astronomer Kristian Lous, grandson of barrister Johan Christian Vogelsang Lous and great-grandson of commodore Carl Christian Lous. His grandfather was the brother of Thora Marie Lous, who in turn was the mother of Christian Lous Lange. Georg Lous was thus a second cousin of Halvard, Carl Viggo and August Lange. Georg Lous was also a first cousin of judge Karl Lous, and second cousin of the famous Thijs Lous.

In 1913 he married Marie Christine Lund, daughter of Kristiania city physician Axel Lund. They had a son, Georg Lous, Jr., a barrister.

== Career ==
He finished his secondary education in 1896, and graduated from the Royal Frederick University with the cand.jur. degree in 1902. He was a deputy judge from 1903 to 1905, junior solicitor in the law firm Lous og Bergh from 1906, then a barrister with access to Supreme Court cases from 1911. From 1917 to 1946 he was a partner in the law firm.

He chaired Falconbridge Nikkelverk, was a board member of Christiania Bank og Kreditkasse, Haugvik Smelteverk, Oslo Staniol- og Metalkapselfabrik and Forsikringsselskapet Norden. He was a supervisory council member of Elektrokemisk, Arendals Fossekompani, Norske Nitrid and Tyssefaldene.

He chaired the rowing club Norske Studenters RK in 1908, and was a board member of the Association for the Promotion of Skiing from 1911 to 1914 and the Norwegian Trekking Association from 1912 to 1913. He died in February 1949 and was buried at Vår Frelsers gravlund.
