= Kristian Lous =

Norwegian astronomer (1875–1941)

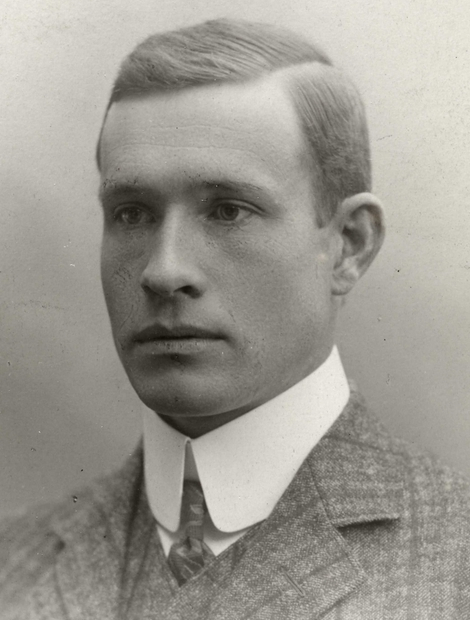
Kristian Lous around year 1900

Kristian Lous (9 August 1875 – 24 September 1941) was a Norwegian astronomer.

He was born in Oslo as a son of Attorney General Karl Lous. He was a brother of barrister Georg Lous, grandson of barrister Johan Christian Vogelsang Lous and great-grandson of commodore Carl Christian Lous. His grandfather was a brother of Thora Marie Lous, who in turn was the mother of Christian Lous Lange. Kristian Lous was thus a second cousin of Halvard, Carl Viggo and August Lange.

He managed the Observatory at the Royal Frederick University from 1919 to its closing in 1934. Special fields include celestial mechanics and the Three-body problem. He edited the official Norwegian almanac from 1928 to 1941. He died in September 1941 and was buried in Ris.
