= Galgenlieder =

Collection of poems by Christian Morgenstern

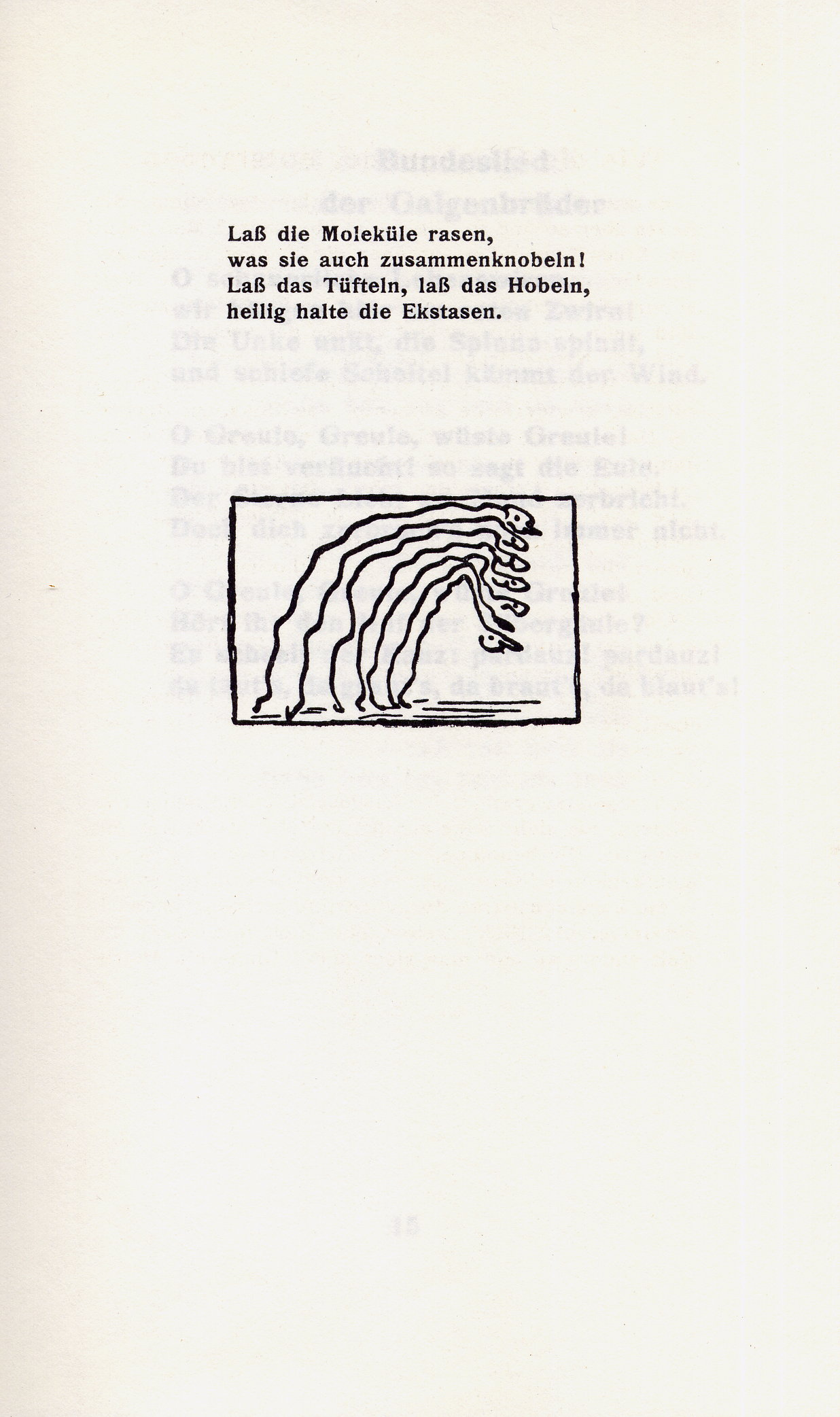
Scan of original document (Galgenlieder nr. 14)

Galgenlieder (transl. Gallows Songs) is a collection of nonsense poems by Christian Morgenstern. After ten years in the writing it was first published in March 1905 by Bruno Cassirer. Illustrations in a different edition were done by the Swiss surrealist artist Paul Klee in 1914. These poems are weird and half macabre, centered on gallows (and gallows humor). Some of them feature a certain item such as furniture, a tool, an animal, an insect or even a lost limb.

Some parts of the poems even has the telling of characters. Palmstroem who is some type of person wandering around, expecting something to happen to him, but it doesn't, because he's lonely. The Gallows child who's a child of gallows hill has a trouble of thinking, but mostly he is to be a representation of a child who has depression. The Raven Ralph is a normal raven who ends up eating gallows food, and in the poem, he lays dead at the end. The moonsheep who is a normal sheep with white Fleece who is waiting to be sheared, also he's up passing away that very morning of the poem. Some of which theorized that the sheep supposed to be a representation of death and time. A knee is a disembodied knee who wanders around the earth after being shot in the war. Sophia, who is the executioner's servant, in one poem Where the hangman sings a song to her that he's dead, but she's nobly great. Some theorized that he is it supposed to represent Jack ketch.

Film Adaptations

Canti della forca (Gallows Songs) is a live action stop motion film made in italy in 2014. Animated and Directed by Stefano Bessoni features five poems in it, while focusing on the creator himself.

== Poems ==
- Titelansage " T
- Motto. Dem Kinde sophia im Manne
- Versu.ch einer Einleitung
- Wie die Galgenlieder entstanden
- Lass die Moleküle rasen
- Bundeslied der Galgenbrüder
- Galgenbruders Lied an Sophie, die Henkersmaid
- Nein!
- Das Gebet
- Das Grosse Lalula
- Der Zwölf-Elf
- Das Mondschaf
- Lunovis
- Der Rabe Ralf
- Fisches Nachtgesang
- Galgenbruders Frühlingslied
- Das Hemmed
- Das Problem
- Neue Bildungen, der Natur vorgeschlagen
- Die Trichter
- Der Tanz
- Das Knie
- Der Seufzer
- Bim, Bam, Bum
- Das ästhetische Wiesel
- Der Schaukelstuhl auf der verlassenen Terrasse
- Die Beichte des Wurms
- Das Weiblein mit der Kunkel
- Die Mitternachtsmaus
- Himmel und Erde
- Der Walfafisch oder das Überwasser
- Mondendinge
- Die Schildkröte
- Der Hecht
- Der Nachtschelm und das Siebenschwein
- Die beiden Esel
- Der Steinochs
- Tapetenblume
- Das Wasser
- Die Luft
- Wer denn?
- Der Lattenzaun
- Die beiden Flaschen
- Das Lied vom blonden Korken
- Der Würfel
- Kronprätendenten
- Die Weste
- Philanthropisch
- Der Mond
- Die Westküsten
- Unter Zeiten
- Unter Schwarzkünstlern
- Der Traum der Magd
- Zäzilie
- Das Nasobem
- Anto-Logie
- Die Hysterix
- Die Probe
- Im Jahre 19000
- Der Gaul
- Der heroische Pudel
- Das Huhn, Möwenlied
- Igel und Agel
- Der Werwolf
- Die Fingur
- Das Fest Des Wüstlings
- Km 21
- Geiß und Schleiche
- Der Purzelbaum
- Die zwei Wurzeln
- Das Geburtslied oder die Zeichen
- Galgenkindes Wiegenlied
- Wie sich das Galgenkind die Monatsnamen merkt
- Galgenberg

== English translations ==
- The Gallows Songs. Christian Morgenstern's Galgenlieder, translated by Max Knight (University of California Press, 1964).
- Gallows Songs, translated by W.D. Snodgrass and Lore Segal (Michigan Press, 1967).
- Songs from the Gallows: Galgenlieder, translated by Walter Arndt (Yale University Press, 1993).
- Lullabies, Lyrics and Gallows Songs, translated by Anthea Bell with illustrations by Lisbeth Zwerger (North South Books, 1995).
- A number of these poems were translated into English by Jerome Lettvin with explanations of Morgensterns wordplay methods and their relationship to Lewis Carroll's methods. These were published in a journal called The Fat Abbot in the Fall Winter 1962 edition, along with an essay illuminating subtle characteristics of the originals.

=== Selected translations ===
PROJECT REPORT

To get this research undertook
I bought a needle and the BOOK,

and with the BOOK an old and hairy
faintly starving dromedary.

N.A.M., to help this thesis,
gave, on loan, a standard Croesus.

When the Croesus, missal-guided
went to Heaven's gate and tried it,

Peter spoke - "The Gospel proves
a camel through a needle moves

Sooner than we may admit
a Rich man." (Christ, J., opus cit).

Testing to confirm the Word,
I loosed our camel, hunger-spurred,

and motivated by a lure
of buns behind the aperture,

The subject, in a single try,
squeezed grunting through the needle's eye;

a graceless act. The camel crammed
and Croesus muttered, "I'll be damned."

ONTOLOGY RECAPITULATES PHILOLOGY

One night, a werewolf, having dined,
left his wife to clean the cave
and visited a scholar's grave
asking, "How am I declined?"

Whatever way the case was pressed
the ghost could not decline his guest,
but told the wolf (who'd been well-bred
and crossed his paws before the dead),

"The Iswolf, so we may commence,
the Waswolf, simple past in tense,
the Beenwolf, perfect; so construed,
the Werewolf is subjunctive mood."

The werewolf's teeth with thanks were bright,
but, mitigating his delight,
there rose the thought, how could one be
hypostasized contingency?

The ghost observed that few could live,
if werewolves were indicative;
whereat his guest perceived the role
of Individual in the Whole.

Condition contrary to fact,
a single werewolf Being lacked
but in his conjugation showed
the full existence, a la mode.

DISINTERMENT

Once there was a picket fence
of interstitial excellence.

An architect much liked its look;
protected by the dark he took

the interspaces from the slats
and built a set of modern flats.

The fence looked nothing as it should,
since nothing twixt its pickets stood.

This artefact soon fated it,
the senate confiscated it,

and marked the architect to go
to Arctic - or Antarctico.

THE SHARK

When Anthony addressed the fishes
a simple shark became religious,
adored the Host, denounced the Aryan,
and turned, save Fridays, vegetarian.

Seeds and weeds he bolted whole
with faith as firm as amphibole,
till vitals issued, overloaded,
lapsed Pelagian and exploded.

So littoral this revelation
fish schools died of inspiration.
The Saint, recalled to bless the lowly,
said only: "Holy! Holy! Holy!"

THE MOONSHEEP

The Moonsheep cropped the Furthest Clearing,
Awaiting patiently the Shearing.
The Moonsheep.

The Moonsheep munched some grass and then
Turned leisurely back to its Pen.
The Moonsheep.

Asleep, the Moonsheep dreamt he was
The Universal Final Cause.
The Moonsheep.

Morning came. The sheep was dead.
His Corpse was white, the Sun was red.
The Moonsheep.

Σ Ξ MAN MET A Π MAN

After many "if"s and "but"s,
emendations, notes, and cuts,

they bring their theory, complete,
to lay, for Science, at his feet.

But Science, sad to say it, he
seldom heeds the laity -

abstractedly he flips his hand,
mutters "metaphysic" and

bends himself again to start
another curve on another chart.

"Come," says Pitts, "his line is laid;
the only points he'll miss, we've made."

THE AESTHETE

When I sit, I sitting, tend
to sit a seat with sense so fine
that I can feel my sit-soul blend
insensibly with seat's design.

Seeking no support the while
it assesses stools for style,
leaving what the structure means
for blind behinds of Philistines.

Zwei Trichter wandeln durch die Nacht.
Durch ihres Rumpfs verengten Schacht
fließt weißes Mondlicht
still und heiter
auf ihren
Waldweg
u. s.
w.

Through darkest night two funnels go;
and in their narrow necks below
moonbeams gather to cast
the better a
light upon
their
path
et
c.

== Visual poems ==
"Fisches Nachtgesang" ("Fish's Night Song") consists only of patterns of macrons and breves printed to suggest fish scales or ripples.

The Night Song of the Fish

ˉ
˘ ˘
ˉ ˉ ˉ
˘ ˘ ˘ ˘
ˉ ˉ ˉ
˘ ˘ ˘ ˘
ˉ ˉ ˉ
˘ ˘ ˘ ˘
ˉ ˉ ˉ
˘ ˘ ˘ ˘
ˉ ˉ ˉ
˘ ˘
ˉ by Christian Morgenstern

== Musical settings ==
- Galgenlieder, six songs by Hanns Eisler 1917
- Galgenlieder a 3 cycle of 15 songs by Sofia Gubaidulina (b.1931)
- Galgenlieder a 5, cycle of 14 songs by Sofia Gubaidulina (b.1931)
- Galgenlieder, 10 songs for mezzo and trio by Anders Brødsgaard (b.1955)
- Galgenlieder, Op. 129, 8 songs for soprano' harp and tuba by Jan Koetsier (1911–2006)
- Galgenlieder, chamber composition by Jacqueline Fontyn (b.1930)
- Galgenlieder, five song cycle by Siegfried Strohbach for male choir a cappella.
- Galgenlieder, five songs "Mondendinge"; "Der Hecht"; "Die Mitternachtsmaus"; "Das Wasser"; "Galgenkindes Wiegenlied", by Vincent Bouchot (b.1966)
- Galgenlieder, 13 Movements for Saxophone Quartet and Children's Choir, by Lera Auerbach (b.1973)
