= Fredrik Monsen =

Norwegian politician

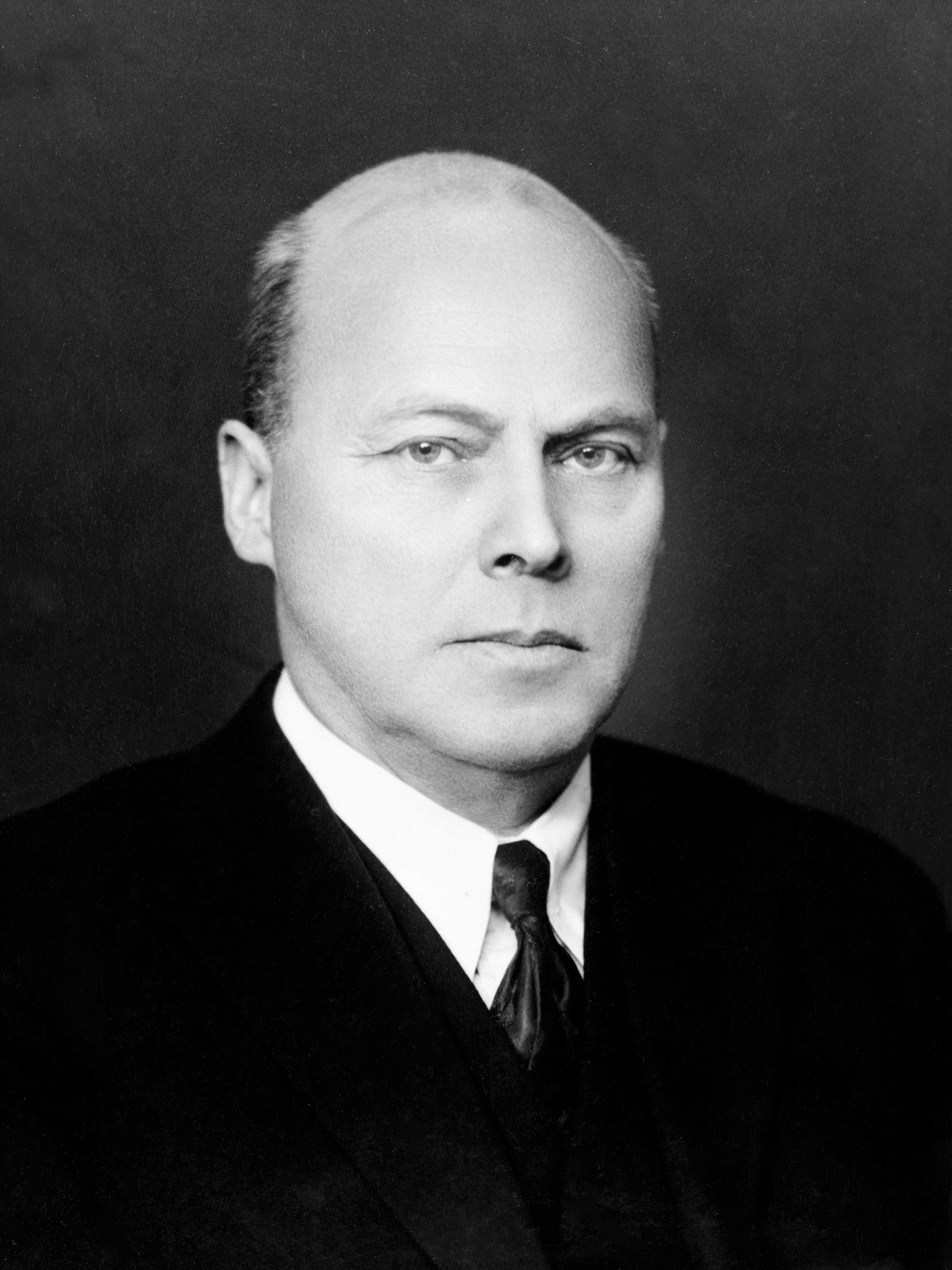

President of the Storting
- In office 10 December 1945 – 10 January 1949
- Monarch: Haakon VII
- Prime Minister: Einar Gerhardsen
- Vice President: Gustav Natvig-Pedersen
- Preceded by: C. J. Hambro
- Succeeded by: Gustav Natvig-Pedersen

Minister of Defence
- In office 20 March 1935 – 22 December 1939
- Prime Minister: Johan Nygaardsvold
- Preceded by: Jens Isak Kobro
- Succeeded by: Birger Ljungberg
- In office 28 January 1928 – 15 February 1928
- Prime Minister: Christopher Hornsrud
- Preceded by: Ingolf E. Christensen
- Succeeded by: Torgeir Anderssen-Rysst

Personal details
- Born: Christian Fredrik Monsen; 27 April 1878 Kristiania, Sweden-Norway
- Died: 31 January 1954 (aged 75) Oslo, Norway
- Party: Norwegian Communist Party (1923–1927); Labour Party (1927–1954)
- Spouse: Aasta Ingerø Hansen
- Children: Per Monsen; Randi Monsen

Christian Fredrik Monsen (27 April 1878 – 31 January 1954) was a Norwegian politician for the Labour Party and the Communist Party.

== History ==
He was born in Kristiania as a son of Ludvig Monsen (1854–1942) and Josefine Aurora Marcelie Dehn (1852–1942).

Monsen edited the newspaper Demokraten from 1913 to 1916 and was a member of Hamar city council from 1907 to 1945, serving as mayor in 1916–1919. He was elected to the Parliament of Norway from the Market towns of Hedmark and Oppland counties in 1922, and was re-elected on six occasions. He represented the Labour Party, except for the term 1925–1927 when he represented the Communist Party. During his last term, from December 10, 1945, to January 10, 1949, he was the President of the Storting. Already before the 1945 election, when the old Parliament was convened, Monsen was installed in the Presidium as the Labour Party dropped their former member of the presidium Magnus Nilssen.

Monsen headed the Ministry of Defence during the short-lived Hornsrud's Cabinet in 1928 and then during Nygaardsvold's Cabinet. Unusually for a Minister of Defence, Monsen was an antimilitarist and wrote three anti-militarist pamphlets (Sannheten om militærvesenet, Avvæbning eller militarisme and Militært vanvidd eller civil fornuft).

Political offices
Preceded by Ingolf Elster Christensen	Norwegian Minister of Defence; January 1928–February 1928	Succeeded by Torgeir Anderssen-Rysst
Preceded by Jens Isak de Lange Kobro	Norwegian Minister of Defence; 1935–1939 (Oscar Torp acting 1935–1936)	Succeeded by Birger Ljungberg
Preceded by Carl Joachim Hambro	President of the Storting; 1945–1949	Succeeded by Gustav Natvig-Pedersen
