= Palmstrøm =

Palmstrøm is a Norwegian surname. Notable people with the surname include:

- Finn Palmstrøm (1903–1987), Norwegian jurist
- Henrik Palmstrøm (1900–1998), Norwegian actuary and statistician
- Rolf Palmstrøm (1893–1975), Norwegian Army officer
