= Per Monsen =

Norwegian editor (1913–1985)

Per Monsen (4 May 1913 – 26 August 1985) was a Norwegian editor. He was an editor in Arbeiderbladet from 1952 to 1964 and 1968 to 1970, director of the International Press Institute from 1964 to 1968 and editor-in-chief of the Norwegian News Agency from 1970 to 1980.

== Personal life ==
He was born in Hamar as a son of politician Fredrik Monsen (1878–1954) and teacher Aasta Ingerø Hansen (1884–1962). He was a brother of Randi Monsen, and through another sister he was a brother-in-law of Halvard Lange. He was also an uncle of Even Lange. Himself, he was first married to Olav Scheflo's daughter Beret Scheflo (1917–1981) from 1941 to 1950. He was then married to Poppi Tichauer Krogvig from 1952.

== Career ==
He finished his secondary education in 1932, and then began a journalist career. He started out in the newspaper Sørlandet under editor-in-chief Olav Scheflo, his future father-in-law. Monsen was a correspondent in 1937 during the Spanish Civil War. Monsen then worked in Bergens Arbeiderblad from 1937 to 1939, and in the labour movement's main newspaper Arbeiderbladet from 1939 to 1941.

In 1940 the occupation of Norway by Nazi Germany had begun, and Monsen was a member of the Norwegian resistance movement. He was imprisoned in Møllergata 19 from 1 December 1940 to 19 May 1941. After his release he fled to Sweden, where he worked in the information service for Norwegian authorities-in-exile. From 1943 to 1945 he worked out of London, where the government-in-exile was seated.

He returned to Arbeiderbladet in 1945. He served as acting press attaché for Norway in Berlin from 1948 to 1949, but returned to Arbeiderbladet again. In 1952 he was promoted to editor. He remained here until 1970, except for a period from 1964 to 1968 when he was the director of the International Press Institute in Zurich. From 1970 to 1980 he was the editor-in-chief of the Norwegian News Agency. He also chaired the Norwegian Press Association from 1954 to 1958.

In the Labour Party, to which the newspaper Arbeiderbladet belonged, Monsen was known as a "hardliner" in foreign and security policy. His brother-in-law Halvard Lange served as Minister of Foreign Affairs from 1945 to 1965, and was a proponent for a pro-American policy in the Cold War. Monsen also supported anti-communists like Haakon Lie. In 1963 the Labour Party was about to elect a new editor-in-chief of Arbeiderbladet. The editor who was about to step down, Olav Larssen, wanted Monsen. Larssen had also worked with Per Monsen's father in Demokraten from 1913 to 1916. On the other hand, Einar Gerhardsen was against the election of Monsen as editor-in-chief of Arbeiderbladet in 1963, and Monsen was not elected.
