= Helliesen =

Helliesen is a Norwegian surname. Notable people with the surname include:

- Henrik Laurentius Helliesen (1824–1900), Norwegian civil servant and politician
- Kari Helliesen (born 1938), Norwegian politician
