= Kari Helliesen =

Norwegian politician

- Born: 2 November 1938 (age 87); Stavanger, Norway
- Occupation: Politician
- Political party: Labour Party
- Parent: Gustav Natvig-Pedersen

Kari Helliesen (born 2 November 1938) is a Norwegian politician for the Labour Party.

== Biography ==
Helliesen was born in Stavanger on 2 November 1938 to Marie Elisabeth Kløvstad and rector and politician Gustav Natvig-Pedersen. She was elected deputy representative to the Storting for the periods 1985–1989, 1989–1993 and 1993–1997 for the Labour Party. She replaced Gunnar Berge at the Storting from May 1986 to September 1989, when Berge was Minister of Finance, and replaced Gunn Vigdis Olsen-Hagen after her death in December 1989.
