= Erling Wikborg =

Norwegian politician

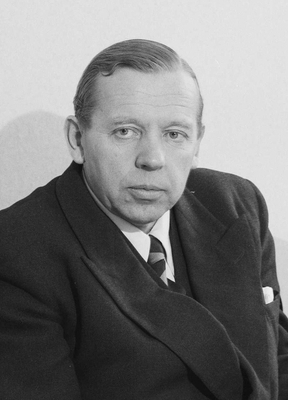
- Erling Wikborg in 1951.

Leader of the Christian Democratic Party
- In office 26 April 1951 – 20 May 1955
- Preceded by: Nils Lavik
- Succeeded by: Einar Hareide

Minister of Foreign Affairs
- In office 28 August 1963 – 25 September 1963
- Prime Minister: John Lyng
- Preceded by: Halvard Lange
- Succeeded by: Halvard Lange

Personal details
- Born: 5 November 1894 Drammen, Norway
- Died: 6 April 1992 (aged 97) Oslo, Norway
- Party: Christian Democratic

Erling Wikborg (5 November 1894 – 6 April 1992) was a Norwegian politician for the Christian Democratic Party.

He was elected to the Norwegian Parliament from Akershus in 1945, and was re-elected from Oslo on two occasions.

Wikborg held a number of other prominent posts. He was the second leader of the Christian Democratic Party from 1951 to 1955, and a member of the Norwegian Nobel Committee in 1965 and from 1967 to 1970. From August to September 1963 he was Minister of Foreign Affairs during the short-lived centre-right Cabinet of John Lyng.

A lawyer by profession, he was born in Drammen, graduated with a cand.jur. degree in 1918, and studied international law in France and England in 1922 and 1923. Wikborg died on 6 April 1992 at the age of 97.

Party political offices
Preceded by Nils Lavik	Leader of the Christian Democratic Party of Norway; 1951–1955	Succeeded by Einar Hareide
Political offices
Preceded by Halvard Lange	Minister of Foreign Affairs (Norway); August 1963–September 1963	Succeeded by Halvard Lange
