= Carl Johan Frederik Jakhelln =

Norwegian diplomat and writer

Carl Johan Frederik Jakhelln (27 August 1914 – 25 April 1987) was a Norwegian diplomat and writer.

He was born in Andenne, Belgium, as the son of jurist and diplomatist Johan Fredrik Winter Jakhelln. The family lived in five countries when Jakhelln was young, and he took his first higher education at Sorø Academy before moving to Norway. While a student at the University of Oslo, he was arrested for "spying" in 1941 during the German occupation of Norway. He was imprisoned at Møllergata 19 from 31 March to 28 June, and then in Grini concentration camp until November. He was then incarcerated in Sachsenhausen concentration camp until the war's end in May 1945. Here he led a social life with prisoners of several nationalities. He was known for making crossword puzzles, quizzes and other pastimes for fellow prisoners. After the war he issued the book 3 fra Sachsenhausen ('Three From Sachsenhausen') in 1945, together with August Lange and Olav Larssen, where his contribution was the chapter "Vinter i leiren" ('Winter in the Camp'). He also released the poetry collection Dikt fra Sachsenhausen ('Poems From Sachsenhausen'), together with Olav Dalgard, Bjarne Aanesen and Lars Magnus Moen.

Jakhelln began working for the Norwegian Ministry of Foreign Affairs in 1945. From 1948 to 1960 he worked for the United Nations in New York City, South Korea, Laos and Togoland. He was then a counsellor at the Norwegian embassy in Denmark from 1960 to 1966, and then became consul-general in Marseille in 1966, Bremen in 1971 and Le Havre in 1975. He lived in L'Alfàs del Pi in the latter phase of his life, and died in 1987.

== Bibliography ==
- Dikt fra Sachsenhausen (1945). By Olav Dalgard, Bjarne Aanesen, Carl Jakhelln and Lars Moen.
- 3 fra Sachsenhausen (1945). By Carl Jakhelln, August Lange, Olav Larssen and Waclaw Winiarski.
