= Vincent Bouchot =

French composer

Vincent Bouchot (French pronunciation: [vɛ̃sɑ̃ buʃo]; born 1966 in Toulouse) is a French composer and musicologist. For many years, he sang as baritone with the Ensemble Clément Janequin.

He has provided incidental music to several cabarets and theatre productions including Ubu Roi by Alfred Jarry at the Opéra-Comique/Péniche Opéra in 2002. He produced a full opera, Brèves de comptoir, in 2005.

Recorded works include:

- a modern take on Les Cris de Paris on the Ensemble Clément Janequin's album L'écrit du Cri, 2009
- five Galgenlieder "Mondendinge"; "Der Hecht"; "Die Mitternachtsmaus"; "Das Wasser"; "Galgenkindes Wiegenlied", sung by Sandrine Piau on the album Après un rêve, 2011
- mélodie Le Souvenir de Jean Quéval, (1913–1990), composed for Françoise Pollet, 2003

Published works include:

- Vincent Bouchot, "De la musique dans l'oeuvre de Georges Perec: frequentations, themes, structures", in Cahiers Georges Perec 4 (Éditions du Limon, 1990), 97–120.
