= Birger Ljungberg =

Norwegian politician (1884–1967)

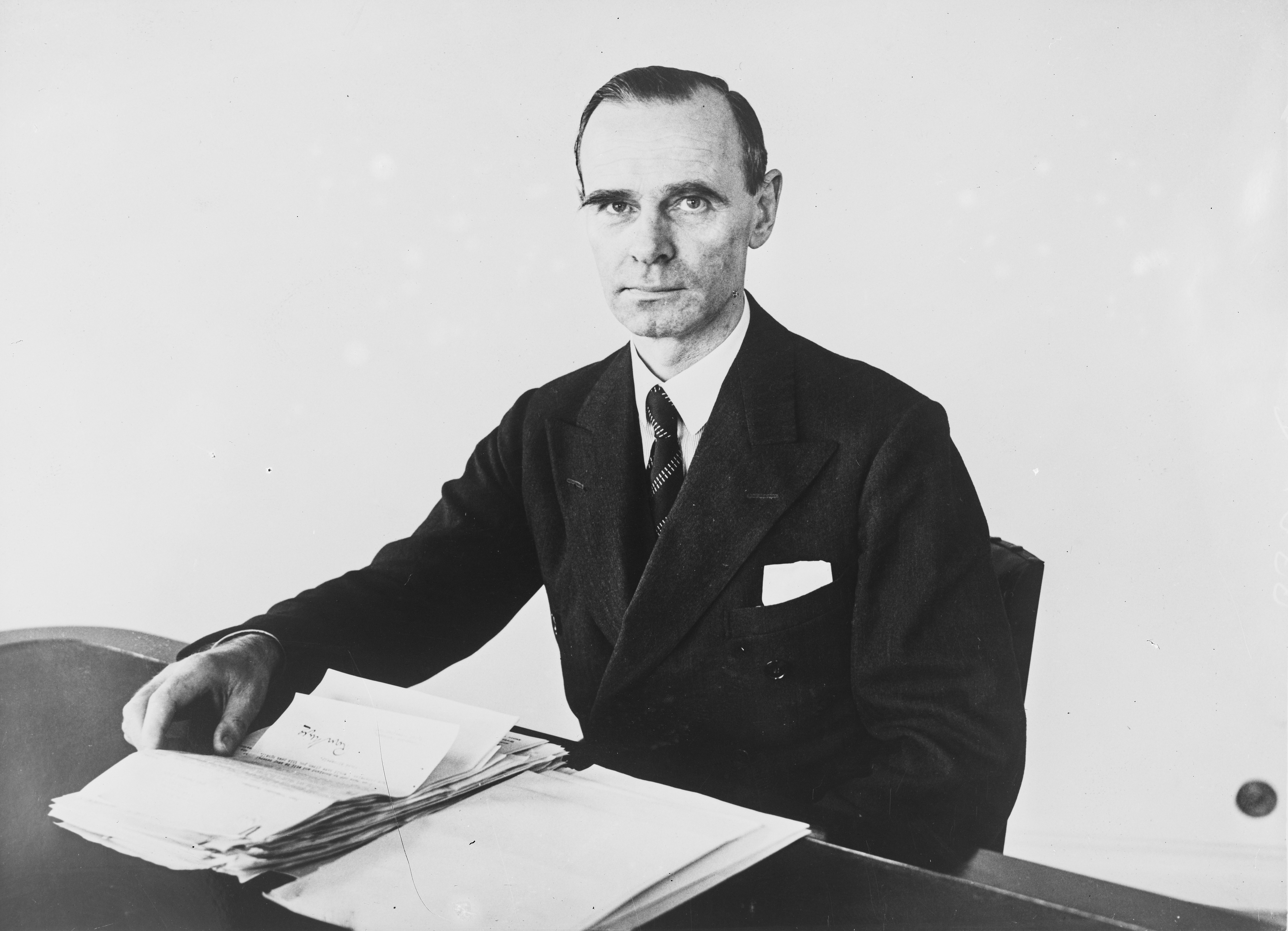

Minister of Defence
- In office 22 December 1939 – 20 March 1942
- Prime Minister: Johan Nygaardsvold
- Preceded by: Fredrik Monsen
- Succeeded by: Oscar Torp

Personal details
- Born: 7 June 1884 Kråkerøy, Fredrikstad, Østfold, Sweden-Norway
- Died: 20 April 1967 (aged 82) Fredrikstad, Østfold, Norway
- Party: Conservative
- Spouse: Beate Konow Søeberg (m. 1928)

Birger Ljungberg (7 June 1884 – 20 April 1967) was a Norwegian military officer and politician from the Conservative Party who served as Minister of Defence from 1939–1942.

Ljungberg was criticized for his actions at the beginning of the Norwegian campaign, the German invasion of Norway, when he did not ensure the rest of the cabinet knew that an ordered partial mobilization would go out in secret, without a public declaration, and slowly by post.

Political offices
Preceded by Fredrik Monsen	Norwegian Minister of Defence; 1939–1941	Succeeded by Oscar Torp
