= Gustav Natvig-Pedersen =

Norwegian philologist, educator and politician

President of the Storting
- In office 11 January 1949 – 10 January 1954
- Prime Minister: Einar Gerhardsen; Oscar Torp
- Vice President: Johan Wiik
- Preceded by: Fredrik Monsen
- Succeeded by: Einar Gerhardsen

Vice President of the Storting
- In office 10 December 1945 – 10 January 1949
- President: Fredrik Monsen
- Preceded by: Magnus Nilssen
- Succeeded by: Johan Wiik

Personal details
- Born: 18 August 1893 Stavanger, Norway
- Died: 27 May 1965 (aged 71)
- Party: Labour

Gustav Natvig-Pedersen (18 August 1893 – 27 May 1965) was a Norwegian philologist, educator and politician for the Labour Party. A school teacher and headmaster during his professional career, he served in Stavanger city council from 1922 to 1964 and three terms in the Norwegian Parliament; during one of these terms he was President of the Storting. He made his mark in language politics.

== Early life and education ==
He was born in Stavanger as a son of sailmaker Johan Pedersen (1857–1941) and his wife Johanne Christine Natvig (1863–1940). He briefly attended the Norwegian Military Academy, but graduated with the cand.philol. degree in 1919. In the same year he was hired as a school teacher in Stavanger. He was also a standing military officer, and held the rank Premier Lieutenant from 1920.

== Political career ==
He was elected to Stavanger city council for the first time in 1922, and was re-elected successively throughout the rest of the interwar period. He chaired his local party chapter from 1925 to 1926 and 1935 to 1936, and was a member of the Labour Party national board from 1936 to 1939. From 1926 to 1928 he was a member of the city school board. He was also board chairman of the local party newspaper Den 1ste Mai from 1927 to 1936. He was elected to the Norwegian Parliament from the Market towns of Vest-Agder and Rogaland counties in 1936.

Among the political cases during this period, Natvig-Pedersen made a mark in the language issue. He was one of the people behind the orthographic reform of 1938, which implemented a converge between Nynorsk and Bokmål. He issued the orthographic dictionary Norsk rettskrivingsordliste in 1938 together with August Lange; the book was reprinted ten times. In the next year, Natvig-Pedersen followed with a textbook in Norwegian Bokmål. He later served as a member of the Norwegian Language Committee from 1953 to 1962, and in 1959 he issued a new version of Norsk rettskrivingsordliste together with Kjølv Egeland.

During the occupation of Norway by Nazi Germany, he was imprisoned by the Nazis. He was first arrested in March 1942 for boycotting the Nazi creation, the Teachers Union, together with a large number of other teachers, including Kjell Bondevik. He sat at Grini for one day, later at Jørstadmoen and Kirkenes. He was then released, only to be arrested again on 8 March 1943. He was imprisoned at Grini later that month, and in May he was transferred to Sachsenhausen. After the liberation he returned to his teaching job, the Norwegian Parliament and Stavanger city council. He was re-elected to Parliament twice; in 1945 and 1949. From January 1949 to January 1954 he served as the President of the Storting.

He spent the rest of his professional career as headmaster at St. Svithuns School, having left Stavanger Cathedral School in 1946. He also held a number of cultural offices. He was a board member of Stavanger Museum from 1935 to 1958 and chair from 1958 to 1965, deputy board member of the Institute for Comparative Research in Human Culture from 1947 to 1950, board member of Rogaland Teater from 1953 to 1965 and chair of FK Vidar. He was a member of the Norwegian Nobel Committee from 1948 to 1965, and also held a few industrial positions: member of the Vest-Agder and Rogaland railway committee from 1938 to 1959 and chair of Norsk Jernverk from 1946 to 1964.

In 1962 he was decorated as a Commander of the Royal Norwegian Order of St. Olav. He was also a Knight of the Monegasque Princeps et Patria order from 1950. He retired as a headmaster in 1962, and left Stavanger city council in 1964. He died in May 1965.

Political offices
Preceded by Christian Fredrik Monsen	President of the Storting; 1949–1954	Succeeded by Einar Gerhardsen
