= Gunn Vigdis Olsen-Hagen =

Norwegian politician

Gunn Vigdis Olsen-Hagen (born 14 August 1946 in Sandnes, died 30 December 1989) was a Norwegian politician for the Labour Party.

She was elected to the Norwegian Parliament from Rogaland in 1977, and was re-elected on three occasions. A few months into her fourth term she died and was replaced by Kari Helliesen.

On the local level she was a member of Sandnes city council from 1971 to 1979.

Outside politics she spent her career in the administrative department of Rogalands Avis.
