= Rolf Normann Torgersen =

Norwegian jurist and civil servant

Rolf Normann Torgersen (17 August 1918 – 15 January 2010) was a Norwegian jurist and civil servant.

He was born in Kristiania, finished his secondary education in 1936 and took the cand.jur. degree in 1941. He studied at Cambridge University from 1947 to 1948, The Hague Academy of International Law in 1947 and 1952 and at Columbia University from 1952 to 1953. He was a deputy judge and junior solicitor in his early career, and after the Second World War he was a secretary in the Compensation Department of the Ministry of Justice. The Compensation Department was tasked with returning or otherwise compensating for items that had been confiscated during the occupation of Norway by Nazi Germany. Torgersen was also present at the Nuremberg Trials of 1945 and 1946, and wrote the process document Germany's Crimes against Norway together with Finn Palmstrøm.

From 1948 to 1962 Torgersen was an assistant secretary in the Ministry of Justice. From 1961 to 1963 he aided the Ministry of Transport and the Parliamentary Standing Committee on Transport with working out the new Public Roads Act. From 1962 to 1971 he was a head of department in the Norwegian Directorate of Public Roads. From 1971 to 1981 he was the director of the Secretariat on Traffic Safety in the Ministry of Transport, and from 1981 to 1988 he was a special adviser. After his official retirement at age 70, he became an adviser in the Ministry of Consumer Affairs and Administration, where he worked for six years.

When turning 70 years old, Torgersen stated that after writing eight books up to then, he had an ambition to write eight more. He managed to write 15 books in total. He edited the journal Nordisk Administrativt Tidsskrift from 1973 to 1977, and chaired the Norwegian branch of Det nordiske administrative forbund from 1977 to 1979. He was also a member of Norwegian and Nordic committees such as Statens Rasjonaliseringsråd and the Nordic Road Safety Council. His most marked contribution to society was developments in traffic safety. During his time as director of the Secretariat on Traffic Safety, numerous improvements to traffic safety were made, including mandatory seat belts, lowered speed limits and the introduction of traffic enforcement cameras (colloquially in Norwegian: "photoboxes"). It has been claimed that Torgersen was "the father of the photobox" in Norway, but this particular claim has been disputed.

Torgersen resided in Uranienborg, Oslo. He died in January 2010.
