= Karl Aage Rasmussen =

Danish composer and writer

Karl Aage Rasmussen (born 13 December 1947) is a Danish composer and writer. He was born in Kolding.

== Composition ==
Quotation and particularly collage played an important role in his music from the early 1970s, but increasingly he used pre-existing musical material in new connections and for new purposes, most often in a densely woven montage of small idioms which in themselves were too tiny to work as quotes, but were put together so closely as to create entirely new patterns. He continued to use montage technique, but the non-directional expression was gradually replaced by developmental forms. This is apparent in music for the stage and was later continued in works such as A Symphony in Time and the string quartets Solos and Shadows and Surrounded by Scales.

The chamber symphony Movements on a Moving Line marks the beginning of a long period dominated by an interest in time and tempo, here as a kind of time-travel where the same music seems to appear and disappear in different tempi. New conceptions of time, partly related to the self-similarity in fractal mathematics, has dominated his music since then. In more recent years psychological and dramatic dimensions have emerged in works such as the violin concerto, Scherzo with Bells, Webs in a stolen Dream and the violin concerto "Sinking through the Dream Mirror". 2015-18 composer in residence with the baroque orchestra Concerto Copenhagen resulting in several new works including "The Four Seasons After Vivaldi" (2016).

For more than two decades Rasmussen worked as full professor of composition at the Academy of Music in Aarhus, Denmark. Among his students: Louis Aguirre Rovira, Anne Linnet, Kaj Aune, Peter Bruun, Anders Brødsgaard, Karsten Fundal, Michael Nyvang, Jesper Koch, Niels Rønsholdt and Simon Steen-Andersen.

== Writing ==
Rasmussen is a prolific writer of essays, so far collected in three volumes. His books, among which several have been translated, on Glenn Gould, Robert Schumann, Sviatoslav Richter, Gustav Mahler, John Cage, Johann Sebastian Bach, George Gershwin, Pyotr Tchaikovsky, Johannes Brahms, Sergei Prokofiev and music in the 20th century have reached a wide audience.

== Reconstruction ==
Rasmussen has also been engaged in several large projects centered on the music of Franz Schubert. Schubert left his opera Sakontala unfinished and with only the parts for singers sketched out, but Rasmussen completed and orchestrated a performing version of the opera, first performed in Stuttgart 2006. He has further reconstructed what he believes to be Schubert's lost Gastein symphony and created an orchestral version of his melodrama Der Taucher commissioned by the Danish singer Bo Skovhus. He has also completed Robert Schumann's fourth piano sonata.

== Selected works ==
=== Opera ===
- Jephta (1977)
- Majakovskij (1978)
- Jonah (radio opera 1983)
- Our Hoffmann (1986)
- The Sinking of the Titanic (1993)
- Sakontala (reconstruction of an unfinished opera by Franz Schubert, 2003)

=== Orchestral ===
- Recapitulations (1968)
- Symphonie Classique (1969)
- Anfang und Ende (1973)
- A Symphony in Time (1982)
- Movements on a Moving Line (1987)
- Three Friends (1995)
- The Lion, the Mouse, the big Elephant and Jens, the Ant (1997, tale for children after Asger Jorn)
- Scherzo with Bells (1996)
- A Tempo (2001)
- Postludes, for 23 solo strings (2007)
- Building (2007)

=== Concertante ===
- Contrafactum, cello concerto (1980)
- Violin concerto ("Sinking through the Dream Mirror", 1993)
- Double concerto for harp and guitar (1998)
- Invisible Mirrors, for guitar and chamber orchestra (1999)
- Concerto for baroque oboe and (period) stringe (2015)
- Concerto for baroque violin (2017)

=== Chamber music ===
- This moment (1966)
- Resonance (1972)
- Love is in the World (1975)
- A Ballad of Game and Dream (1975)
- Berio Mask (1977)
- Parts Apart (1978)
- Italian concerto (1981)
- Four, Five – for brass quintet (1982)
- Solos and Shadows (string quartet, 1983)
- Surrounded by Scales (string quartet, 1985)
- Movements on a Moving Line (chamber version, 1988)
- Webs in a Stolen Dream (1996)
- Twin Dream (1998)
- Trauergondol (1998)
- Camera oscura, saxophone quintet (2001)
- Liri for flute, clarinet, bassoon, strings and piano (2008)
- Scherzino - a homage to Brahms (2015) for clarinet, violin, cello and piano
- Follia, follia ... for 2 oboes, bassoon, string quintet and harpsichord (2015)
- Græs for large unaccompanied choir (2018)
- Gleichwie das Gras, Cantata nach Bach (2019)

=== Piano solo ===
- 13 Etudes and Postludes (1990)
- Contrary Dances (1992)
- Barcarole (1996)
- Sonata IV (completion of Robert Schumann's unfinished fourth piano sonata)

=== Arrangements, transcriptions etc. ===
- Carl Nielsen: Commotio, interpretation for full orchestra (2000)
- Franz Schubert: Symphony in E (Gastein), reconstruction (2004)
- Robert Schumann: Five lieder (lyrics by Hans Christian Andersen), version for orchestra (2005)
- Franz Schubert: Der Taucher, version for orchestra (2006)
- Johannes Brahms: Serenade 1 in D major, version for 10 instruments
- Johannes Brahms: Serenade 2 in A major, version for 10 instruments
- Igor Stravinsky: Concertino, version for 9 instruments
- Erik Satie: Sports et divertissement, version for 7 instruments
- Antonio Vivaldi: The Four Seasons, a new reading for soloists, period strings and continuo
- Niels W. Gade: Piano trio in B♭ major, 1839, three unfinished movements completed

== Honors ==
- 1987 Hakon Børresen prize
- 1991 Carl Nielsen prize
- 1997 Edition Wilhelm Hansen prize
- 2003 The Danish Academy, The Foundation's Prize
- 2012 Poul and Sylvia Schierbecks Memory Grant
- 2017 Grand Prize of the Frobenius Foundation
