= Jesper Koch =

Danish composer (born 1967)

Jesper Koch (born 5 September 1967) is a Danish composer.

Koch studied composition at The Royal Danish Academy of Music with Hans Abrahamsen, Ib Nørholm and Ivar Frounberg from 1986–95 and subsequently at Det Jyske Musikkonservatorium with Karl Aage Rasmussen in 1995–97, as well as some studies abroad with Olav Anton Thommesen and Colin Matthews. He is known for his "brilliant orchestral writing" and has been composer-in-residence with South Jutland Symphony Orchestra for three years and has composed works on commission by Odense Symphony Orchestra, Aalborg Symphony Orchestra and Collegium Musicum.

== Awards ==
Jesper Koch received "Carl Nielsens komponistlegat" in 1988 and Léonie Sonnings Musikstipendium in 1991. In 1992 he won the first prize at the International Rostrum of Composers in Paris in the "Composers under 30" category for his work Ice-Breaking. He received Statens Kunstfond's three-year work grant in 1994.
