= Jan Greve =

Norwegian psychiatrist

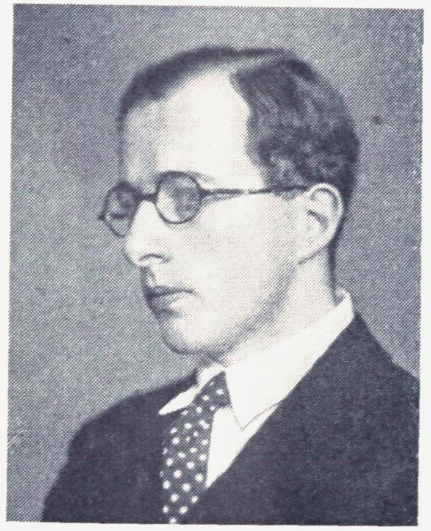
Jan Greve.

Jan Greve (?? – 1996) was a Norwegian psychiatrist who is best known for having used cannabis and LSD to treat his patients. In 1972 he was sentenced to one year in prison, of which nine months was probation, and his medical licence was revoked for two years. He resumed his practice following this time.

Retrospectively, Greve has stated that he considered the case to be part of a witchhunt where deviations from the mainstream drug policy view was the real enemy.
