= Olaf Kolstad =

Norwegian businessman (1920–1996)

Olaf Kolstad (16 June 1920 – 2 July 1996) was a Norwegian businessperson.

He hailed from Askim. He had a long career in insurance, and started as regional director in Brage in 1946. He later worked fifteen years for Storebrand before being hired as marketing director in Gjensidige Liv. From 1979 to 1985 he was the company's chief executive officer. He was a driving force behind the cooperation with Samtrygd, which changed its name to Gjensidige Skade, and later the fusion between Gjensidige Liv and Gjensidige Skade into Gjensidige Forsikring. After Kolstad retired in 1985 the companies got one common chief executive.

Kolstad died in 1996.
