= Johannes Kvittingen =

Norwegian bacteriologist (1906–1996)

Johannes Kvittingen, sometimes called Johs. Kvittingen (20 February 1906 – 13 January 1996) was a Norwegian bacteriologist and chief physician in Trondheim, and resistance member during World War II.

He was a microbacteriologist, and worked at the Bacteriological Laboratory of the Norwegian Army before World War II. When Germany invaded and occupied Norway in 1940, the laboratory was closed. Kvittingen fled the country to conduct resistance work abroad. In London he worked with medicinal services for Norwegians in exile. Among others, he contributed to drastically improve the treatment of venereal diseases in seamen, reducing the convalescence from months to weeks.

Kvittingen had become known among the British when securing the retreat of four British troops gone astray in Norwegian mountains in May 1940. He had experience from 1935 in Italian-occupied Ethiopia, where he led the retreat of a failed Norwegian "expedition". Thus, in the autumn of 1940 he was asked to be head recruiter of Norwegian agents for the Special Operations Executive. He has been credited with recruiting Martin Linge as an SOE agent, but that particular suggestion really came from Olav Rytter in correspondence with Kvittingen.

After the war, Kvittingen returned to microbiology, and also expanded his interest to other medical fields. In 1952 he became chief physician at Trondheim Central Hospital. He was decorated with the HM The King's Medal of Merit and the Royal Norwegian Order of St. Olav as well as foreign orders of merit, and died in January 1996.
