= Knut Skaaluren =

Norwegian politician

Knut Skaaluren (11 October 1916 – 4 March 1996) was a Norwegian shipbuilder and politician for the Centre Party.

He was educated at Bergen Technical School. His shipyard Skaalurens Skibsbyggeri in Rosendal built a number of different vessels, though wooden boats were discontinued in 1955 and fishing vessels were discontinued in 1969. After that, the shipyard mainly built car ferries. It was a family company started by his great-grandfather Tørris Skaaluren in the 1850s; in 1974 it became a limited company and in the early 1980s, Knut's son who was also named Tørris Skaaluren took over.

Knut Skaaluren served on the municipal council for Kvinnherad Municipality from 1951 to 1971, serving as mayor from 1960 to 1963. He served as a deputy representative to the Parliament of Norway from Hordaland during the terms 1961–1965 and 1965–1969. In total he met during 52 days of parliamentary session.

He sat on a number of local and regional boards and committees, mainly in the shipbuilding industry as well as the banking sector. He was chairman of the board of Hardanger Sunnhordlandske Dampskipsselskap, a board member of Det Norske Luftfartsselskap and supervisory council member of SAS. He died in March 1996 at the age of 79.
