= Johnny Larntvet =

Norwegian ice hockey player

Personal information
- Born: 27 October 1916 Oslo, Norway
- Died: 27 September 1996 (aged 79)

Sport
- Sport: Ice hockey

John Larntvet (27 October 1916 – 27 September 1996) was a Norwegian ice hockey player, born in Oslo, Norway. He played for the Norwegian national ice hockey team, and participated at the Winter Olympics in 1952, where the Norwegian team placed 9th.
