= Anders Brødsgaard =

Danish composer (born 1955)

Anders Brødsgaard (born 1955) is a Danish composer. He studied piano at the Carl Nielsen Academy of Music in Odense from 1974, then from 1986-1990 studied composition at the Royal Danish Academy of Music in Århus, under Karl Aage Rasmussen, Per Nørgård and Hans Abrahamsen. He also studied with Sven David Sandstrøm and Edison Denisov. Brødsgaard teaches music theory at the Royal Danish Academy of Music in Copenhagen and the Carl Nielsen Academy of Music in Odense.
