= Stein Åros =

Norwegian politician

Stein Åros (17 March 1952 – 4 July 1996) was a Norwegian politician for the Labour Party.

He served as a deputy representative to the Parliament of Norway from Rogaland during the terms 1981–85, 1985–89 and 1989–93. In total he met during 12 days of parliamentary session.
