= Karl Lous =

Norwegian barrister

Karl Henrik Lous
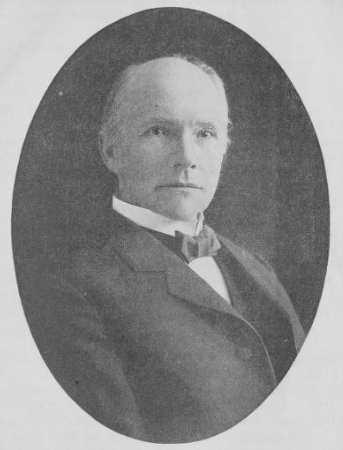
- Born: 14 April 1847; Christiania
- Died: 10 October 1928 (aged 81)
- Occupation: Barrister
- Known for: Attorney General of Norway
- Children: Kristian Lous; Georg Lous
- Relatives: Georg Lous Jr. (grandson)
- Awards: Order of St. Olav (1890)

Karl Henrik Lous (14 April 1847 – 10 October 1928) was a Norwegian barrister.

== Personal life ==
Lous was born in Christiania to Johan Christian Vogelsang Lous and Charlotte Sofie née Maschmann. He was married to Karoline Mathilde Zetlitz from 1874. He was the father of astronomer Kristian Lous, and of barrister and businessperson Georg Lous.

== Career ==
Lous graduated as cand.jur. in 1870, and was barrister with access to work with the Supreme Court from 1874. He served as Attorney General of Norway from 1904 to 1916. He was decorated Knight, First Class of the Order of St. Olav in 1890.

Political offices
Preceded by Peter Birch-Reichenwald	Mayor of Oslo; 1889–1890	Succeeded by Bernhard Getz
Civic offices
Preceded by Johannes Bergh	Attorney General of Norway; 1904–1916	Succeeded by Annæus Johannes Schjødt
