= Georg Lous Jr. =

Norwegian barrister

Georg Lous (19 May 1916 – 23 July 1996) was a Norwegian barrister.

He was a son of barrister Georg Fredrik Hallager Lous, nephew of astronomer Kristian Lous and grandson of Attorney General Karl Lous.

He graduated with the cand.jur. degree in 1940, and was a deputy judge before becoming a junior solicitor in his grandfather's law firm Lous og Bergh. He became a partner in 1949, and from 1953 he was a barrister with access to Supreme Court cases. The company changed its name to Høyesterettsadvokatene Georg Lous og Chr.B. Platou and later Lous, Hagemann, Arff-Pettersen & Løken. In 1992 the structure and name was changed again, to Dalan, Sigmond, Hagemann & Lous. Georg Lous retired in the mid-1990s.

He was a board member from 1966 and chaired the Norwegian Museum of Cultural History from 1975 to 1989. He also chaired industrial companies such as Falconbridge Nikkelverk, and was a supervisory council member of Forsikringsselskapet Norden. In 1986 he released the novel 'Korsika! Korsika! Korsika! under the pseudonym Agro Detaccio. He died in July 1996 and was buried at Vår Frelsers gravlund.
