= Odin Hansen =

Norwegian politician

- Born: 16 April 1918; Gildeskål Municipality, Norway
- Died: 14 September 1996 (aged 78)
- Occupations: Fisherman; Politician

Odin Hansen (16 April 1918 – 14 September 1996) was a Norwegian fisherman and politician.

He was born in Gildeskål Municipality to fisherman Hans Jensen and Mathilde Nilsen. He was elected representative to the Storting for the period 1973–1977 for the Socialist Left Party.
