= Henrik Palmstrøm =

Norwegian actuary and statistician

Henrik Palmstrøm (22 July 1900 – 1 February 1998) was a Norwegian actuary and statistician.

== Biography ==
He was born in Ås as a son of professor Arnfinn Palmstrøm (1867–1922) and Henrikke Qvigstad (1864–1907), and older brother of judge Finn Palmstrøm. He grew up in Ljan and was active in politics from 1931 to 1933 as chair of the Liberal People's Party local branch in Nordstrand.

He finished his secondary education in 1918 and finished the actuary education in 1921. He studied in Copenhagen, Lund and Göttingen from 1921 to 1923. He worked briefly in Statistics Norway in 1922 before being hired in the insurance company Brage. He was an actuary in Brage from 1926 to 1959, except for the years 1943 to 1946 when he was a consultant for the Ministry of Provisioning-in-exile in London. His brother Finn was exiled to London as well; this was because of the German occupation of Norway. Henrik Palmstrøm was married to consul's daughter Malene Marie Aagaard (1899–1964) from 1925; and later a second time, to Eirene Manuel (1912–2006), a British citizen of Greek descent.

From 1927 to 1942 Palmstrøm was in charge of courses in statistics at the University of Oslo. He took the dr.philos. degree in 1937. He specialized in pensioners' welfare, and issued the books Pensjon og samfunn in 1961 and Folketrygden in 1966. He edited the magazine Trygdenytt from 1972 to 1976.

He died in February 1998 and was buried at Vestre gravlund.
