= Solveig Skaugvoll Foss =

Norwegian politician (born 1996)

Solveig Skaugvoll Foss (born 5 December 1996) is a Norwegian politician for the Socialist Left Party.

She served as a deputy representative to the Parliament of Norway from Oslo during the term 2017–2021, meeting during 204 days of parliamentary session.
