= Jens Isak de Lange Kobro =

Norwegian politician (1882–1967)

Jens Isak de Lange Kobro (20 August 1882 – 14 May 1967) was a Norwegian politician for the Liberal Party. He was Minister of Defence 1933–1935.
