= Knut Blom =

Norwegian judge (1916–1996)

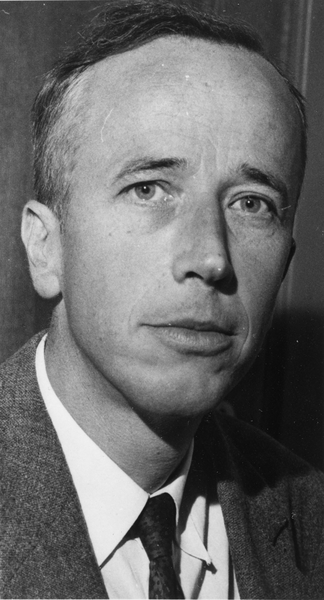
Knut Blom, 1968

Knut Blom (14 February 1916 – 6 February 1996) was a Norwegian judge. He served as a Supreme Court Justice from 1968 to 1986.

He was born in Kristiania as a son of barrister Hans Jensen Blom (1875–1952) and Anna Martens Wingaard (1877–1947). He was a great-grandson of Oluf Petersen Wingaard. He finished his secondary education in 1934, started law studies and graduated with the cand.jur. degree in 1939. He was hired as a junior solicitor under Carl Fridtjof Rode in Melbu in the same year, and took over the attorney's office when Rode was called to naval duty shortly thereafter. From 1940 to 1942 Blom was a deputy judge in Jæren District Court, and from 1942 he was a junior solicitor under Sven Arntzen; from 1947 a partner. During the German occupation of Norway Blom had contacts in Hjemmefrontens Ledelse.

Blom was a lawyer until 1968, and worked as a defender in Oslo City Court from 1953 to 1956, Eidsivating Court of Appeal from 1956 to 1965 and the Supreme Court of Norway from 1965 to 1968. From 1968 to his retirement in 1986 he was a Supreme Court Justice. Legal-academic books include Sakførerens rettslige ansvar (1947) and Prisloven med kommentarer (1954).

He was decorated with the Defence Medal 1940–1945 and in 1978 the Royal Norwegian Order of St. Olav. He died in February 1996 in Oslo.
