= Oda Maria Hove Bogstad =

Norwegian footballer (born 1996)

Personal information
- Date of birth: 24 April 1996 (age 30)
- Place of birth: Moi, Norway
- Position: Goalkeeper

Team information
- Current team: Lyn
- Number: 37

Youth career
- Tonstad
- 2012–2014: Klepp

Senior career*
Years	Team	Apps	(Gls)
–2012	Tonstad		
2014–2017	Klepp	40	(0)
2016	→ Amazon Grimstad (loan)	12	(0)
2018	Lyn	12	(0)
2019	Arna-Bjørnar	19	(0)
2020–2022	Sandviken	14	(0)
2022	Klepp	14	(0)
2023	Lorenskog		
2023	Honefoss BK	2	(0)
2023-2024	Lorenskog		
2026–	Lynn		

International career
2013	Norway U17	2	(0)
2014–2015	Norway U19	6	(0)
2016–2019	Norway U23	9	(0)
- * Club domestic league appearances and goals

Oda Maria Hove Bogstad (born 24 April 1996) is a Norwegian footballer who plays as a goalkeeper for Lyn.

== Life and career ==
Bogstad started playing football because her dad was a coach and her big sister also played football.
