= Randi Monsen =

Norwegian illustrator (1910–1997)

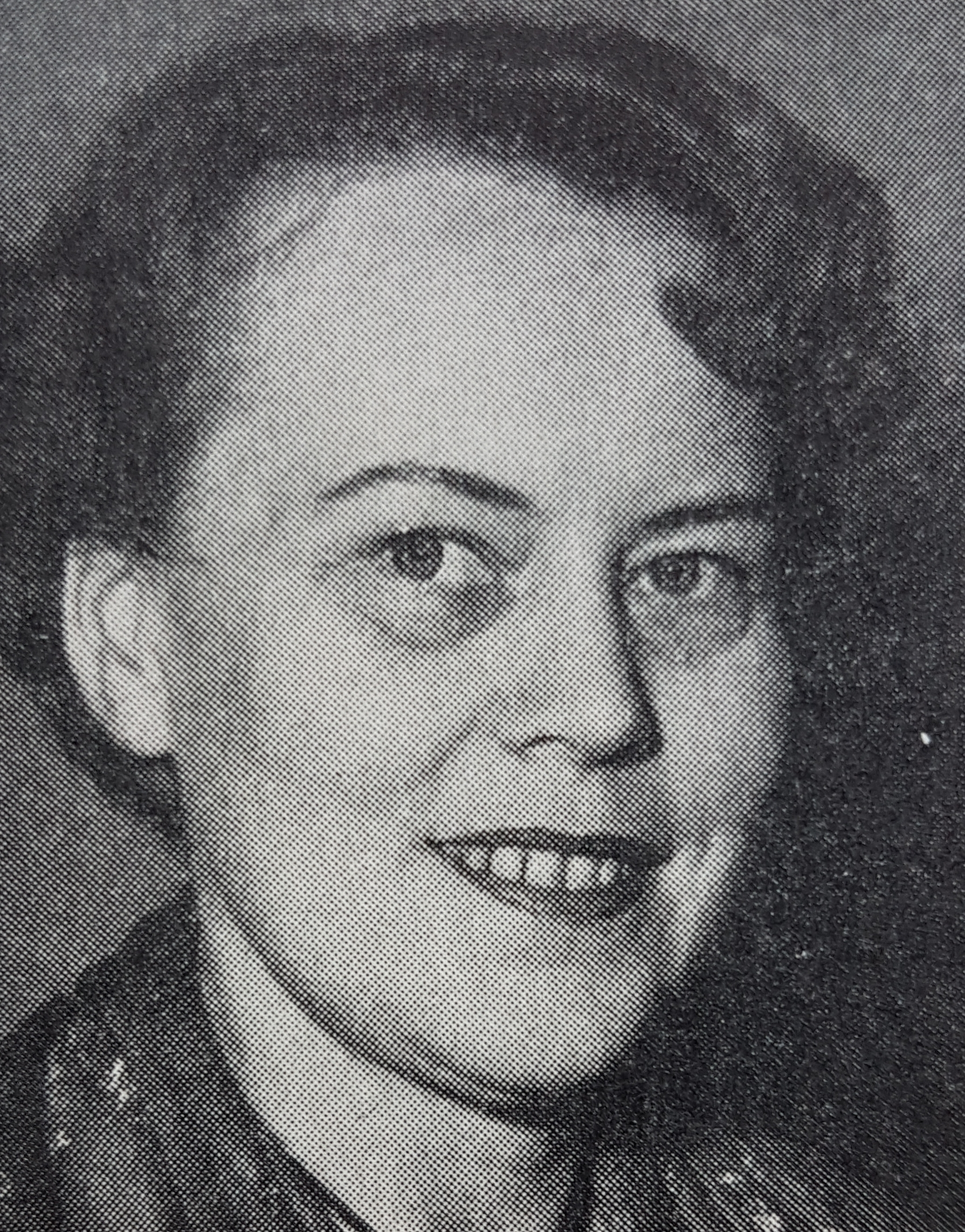
- Born: 18 February 1910; Hamar, Norway
- Died: 24 August 1997 (aged 87)
- Occupation: Illustrator
- Employer: Arbeiderbladet
- Father: Fredrik Monsen
- Relatives: Per Monsen (brother)

Randi Monsen (18 February 1910 – 24 August 1997) was a Norwegian illustrator. She was born in Hamar; the daughter of politician Fredrik Monsen and a sister of Per Monsen. She worked for the newspaper Arbeiderbladet from 1935 to 1980. She has illustrated several books, and is represented at the National Gallery of Norway.
