= Bjarne Øverhaug =

Norwegian journalist and politician (1927–1996)

Bjarne Øverhaug (3 November 1927 – 20 August 1996) was a Norwegian journalist and politician for the Labour Party.

He served as a deputy representative to the Parliament of Norway from Hedmark during the terms 1969–1973 and 1973–1977. In total he met during 16 days of parliamentary session. He resided in Tynset Municipality and was a journalist in Hamar Arbeiderblad.
