= Erling Christie =

Norwegian writer

Erling Christie (19 May 1928 — 3 September 1996) was a Norwegian author who was influential in the introduction of modernism in Norwegian poetry.

Christie was among the pioneers of modernism in Norway both as a poet and a critic. Christie published five poetry collections in his life, and these were collected in the posthumous collection Samlede dikt (Aschehoug 1998).

His literary works meant that Christie introduced a large number of English language authors to the Norwegian public, and his own poetry was inspired by English speaking authors such as T. S. Eliot.

In 1959 Erling Christie had an accident that led to him losing his sight and becoming unemployed. This led to him writing Tegnene slukner, which was published the year after the accident took place.

== Selected works ==
- Drøm om havet (Aschehoug 1954)
- Serenade for blå gitar (Aschehoug 1956)
- Minus. Satiriske dikt (Aschehoug 1959)
- Tegnene slukner (Aschehoug 1960)
- Samlede dikt (Aschehoug 1998)
