= Finn Palmstrøm =

Norwegian jurist (1903–1987)

Finn Palmstrøm (19 October 1903 – 26 January 1987) was a Norwegian jurist. He was a budala and judge before and during the Second World War, and also fought as a soldier. After the war he was a civil servant and judge, serving as district stipendiary magistrate between 1946 and 1973. He also had a short period in local politics.

== Pre-war life and career ==
He was born in Kristiania as a son of professor Arnfinn Palmstrøm (1867–1922) and Henrikke Qvigstad (1864–1907), and younger brother of actuary Henrik Palmstrøm. He finished his secondary education in 1922 and took the cand.jur. degree at the University of Oslo in 1926. After working the years 1926 to 1929 as a junior solicitor, he started his own law firm together with Richard August Riekeles in 1930. Palmstrøm was a deputy judge in Vest-Telemark District Court from 1935 to 1937, and then returned to the law firm.

== World War II ==
During the Winter War, which lasted from 1939 to 1940, Palmstrøm was a volunteer on the Finnish side, fighting against the Soviet Union. He returned to Norway to find his country invaded by Germany on 9 April 1940, and Palmstrøm took part in the subsequent fighting. He soon fled to the United Kingdom, where he joined Norwegian Independent Company 1 ("Kompani Linge"). He trained with the company in 1941 and 1942, and participated in the Måløy Raid. From 1942 to 1945 he was a defender in the Norwegian military court in London. He held the rank of lieutenant colonel. From 1944 to 1946 he also headed the "Norwegian national office", an office tasked with registering people whom the Norwegian government-in-exile regarded as war criminals.

== Post-war life and career ==
From 1945 to 1946 he was an acting assistant secretary in the Norwegian Ministry of Justice. He was also present at the Nuremberg Trials of 1945 and 1946, and wrote the Report on Germany's Crimes against Norway together with Rolf Normann Torgersen. He was also one of four Norwegian members of the United Nations War Crimes Commission, together with Jacob Aars Rynning, Erik Colban and Terje Wold.

In 1946 he finally quit the law firm as he was appointed as the district stipendiary magistrate of Tana District Court. From 1946 to 1952 he was also a judge in cases pertaining to war affairs in Finnmark. From 1952 to 1973 he was the district stipendiary magistrate of Solør District Court. While serving here, he was also a member of Åsnes municipal council from 1960 to 1962. After retiring, he moved back to Oslo where he functioned as a civil servant in the Ministry of Agriculture.

He was decorated with the Defence Medal 1940–1945, the 1939–45 Star, the Haakon VII 70th Anniversary Medal and a Finnish war medal. He was married to British citizen Bettine Marie Louise Ridley since 1937. He died in January 1987 and was buried at Vestre gravlund.
