= Petra Mohn =

Norwegian politician (1911–1996)

Petra Mohn (11 March 1911 – 15 June 1996) was a Norwegian politician for the Conservative Party.

While her occupation was as a housewife, Mohn became involved in politics. She was "not particularly a women's rights activist", but was engaged in social and health policy and especially the child protective services. She sat on the social board and health board locally, was the deputy leader of Østfold's countywide committee for child protective services (Østfold samarbeidende barnevernsnevnder) and was a board member of Østfold Central Hospital. She was elected to the executive committee of Glemmen municipal council; when Glemmen was absorbed into Fredrikstad Municipality in 1964, she continued on the city council until 1975. In the mid-1960s (1963–1967) she was also the only woman elected to Østfold county council.

On the ballot for the 1961 Norwegian parliamentary election, she was nominated in 4th place on the Conservative Party ballot in Østfold. She served as the second deputy representative to the Norwegian Parliament during the terms 1961–1965. In total she met during 5 days of parliamentary session, She was nominated 7th on the ballot in 1965. and was not re-elected as a representative.

She was described as possessing a "combattive nature", but stated that her work for the child protective services was "apolitical".

Mohn died in June 1996, aged 85.
