= Vetle Langedahl =

Norwegian politician (born 1996)

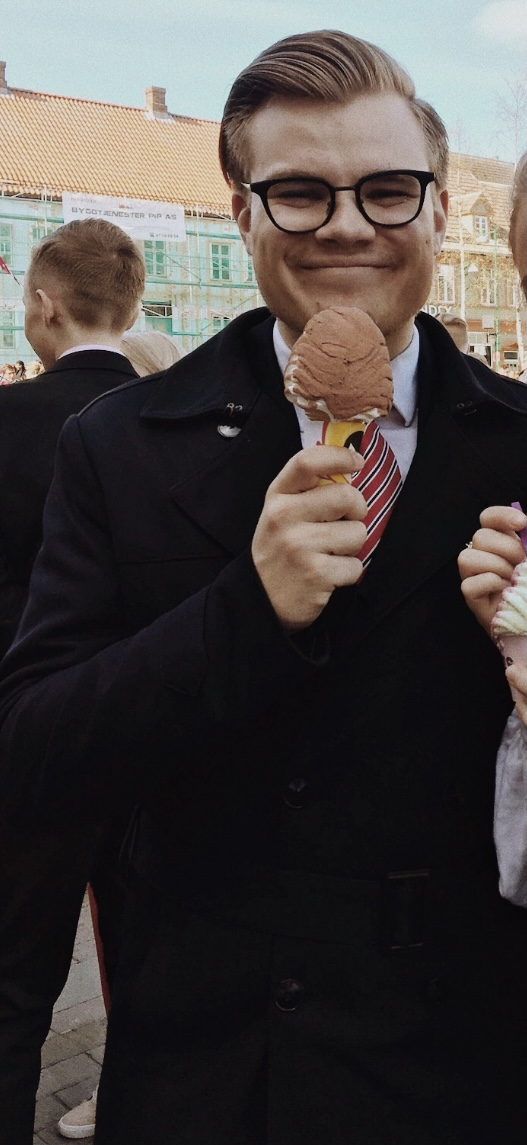

Vetle Langedahl (born 30 October 1996) is a Norwegian politician for the Conservative Party.

In 2015 he became deputy member of municipal council for Hammerfest Municipality and member of Finnmark county council. He commenced studies at the University of Tromsø, and in 2017 he had to withdraw from his political positions, as he no longer had residence in Hammerfest.

He served as a deputy representative to the Parliament of Norway from Finnmark during the term 2017–2021.
