= Richard August Riekeles =

Norwegian barrister (1904–1996)

Richard August Riekeles (13 March 1904 – 18 April 1996) was a Norwegian barrister.

He took the cand.jur. degree in 1926. After working as a deputy judge and junior solicitor he started his own law firm together with Finn Palmstrøm in 1930. He later partnered with Ludolf Næss, and from 1976 to 1991 with Øivind Fegth Knutsen and Arne Os. He was a barrister from 1936, with the right to work with Supreme Court cases. He is best known for being the prosecutor in the Oslo City Court case in 1957 where Agnar Mykle was tried for his novel Sangen om den røde rubin. He was also chairman of the insurance company Trygd, Norsk Forsikringsaktieselskap from 1944. He died in April 1996.
