= Kaare Melhuus =

Norwegian politician

Kaare Melhuus (11 May 1915 – 27 October 1996) was a Norwegian politician for the Conservative Party.

He was born in Melhus Municipality as a son of farmers. After finishing his secondary education in Trondheim he graduated with the siv.øk. degree from the Norwegian School of Economics. He worked in mercantile education, as an accountant and consultant, and finished his career as headmaster of Hamar Handelsgymnasium from 1975 to 1985.

Melhuus was a member of the municipal council for Hamar Municipality from 1947 to 1951, and again from 1963 to 1979. He was a deputy member of Hedmark county council from 1963 to 1975. He served as a deputy representative to the Parliament of Norway from Hedmark during the terms 1954–1957 and 1958–1961. In total he met during 122 days of parliamentary session. Melhuus also chaired Hamar Conservative Party (1947–48, 1952–54) and was deputy chair of Hedmark Conservative Party (1952–53).

Melhuus also sat on a number of boards in business and organizations. He was among others a board member of Hamar Handelsgymnasium from 1951 to 1964 and a supervisory council member of Hamar Stiftstidende from 1955 to 1970, Hamar, Vang og Furnes Kommunale Kraftselskap from 1968 to 1984, and Sparebanken Hedmark from 1968 to 1977. He was awarded the King's Medal of Merit in gold in 1985.
