= Carl Viggo Lange =

Norwegian physician and politician

Carl Viggo Manthey Lange (9 April 1904 – 31 May 1999) was a Norwegian physician and politician for the Labour Party.

He was born in Kristiania as a son of Christian Lous Lange (1869–1938) and Bertha Manthey (1867–1947), and brother of August and Halvard Manthey Lange. He enrolled as a student in 1922, and graduated with the cand.med. degree in 1929. While studying, he was a member of Mot Dag, where he organized study circles for both members and non-members, and contributed to the periodical Populært Tidsskrift for Seksuell Oplysning. He was the chairman of the Norwegian Students' Society in 1933, and of the Student Society in Trondheim in 1939.

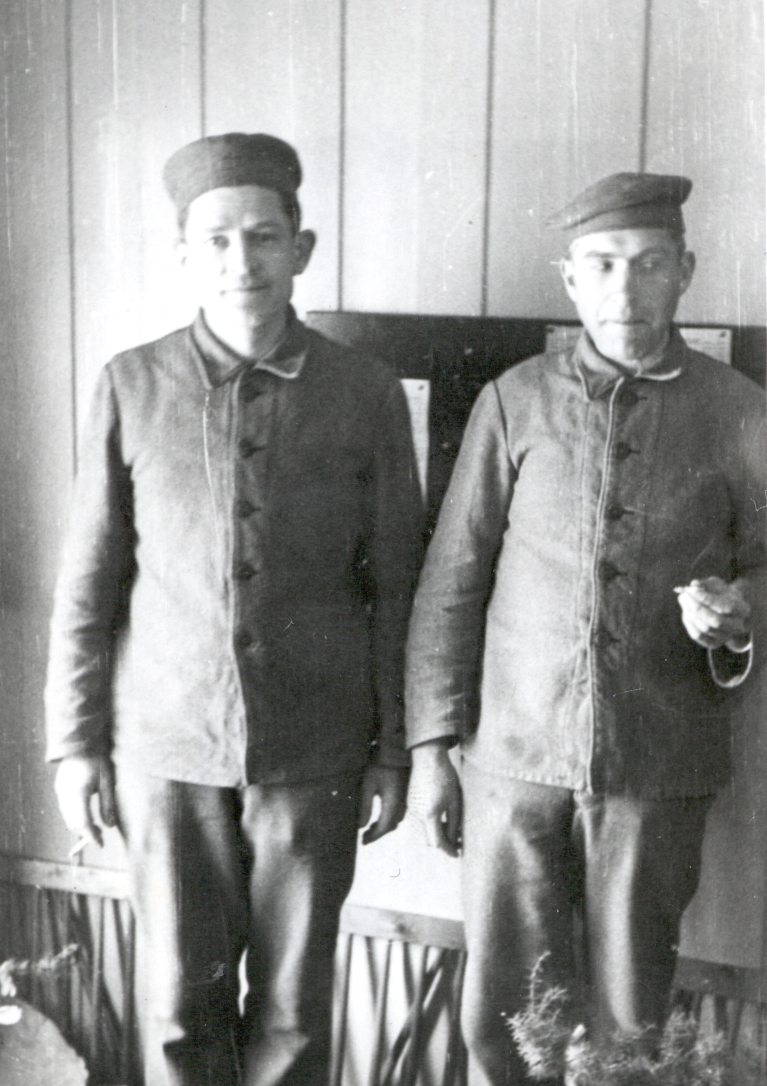
Carl Viggo Lange (left) at Falstad in 1942

Lange worked as a physician in Oslo from 1930, and then in Trondheim from 1934 to 1946. The exception was the period from 1942 to 1945, when he was imprisoned at Falstad concentration camp by the Nazi occupants of Norway. He was acting city physician (stadsfysikus) from 1946 to 1947, and also health inspector in Trondheim from 1946 to 1955. He became involved in politics, and was a member of Trondheim city council from 1945 to 1955, from 1945 to 1950 and 1954 to 1955 as a member of the executive committee. He was elected to the Parliament of Norway from the Market towns of Sør-Trøndelag and Nord-Trøndelag counties in 1949, where he was a member of the Standing Committee on Social Affairs. He was not re-elected in 1953, but served as a deputy representative during the term 1950–1953.

From 1955 to 1964 he was district physician in Oddernes, and from 1964 to his retirement in 1974 he was a county physician in Vest-Agder. When he applied for the post in Vest-Agder, the Norwegian Directorate for Health led by Karl Evang suggested that another candidate be hired. However, Minister of Health Olav Gjærevoll overturned the recommendation and gave Lange the position. This was criticized as a "politicized" appointment.

Lange was board chairman of the Norwegian People's Aid chapter in Trondheim from 1939 to 1946, board member of Trøndelag Teater from 1946 to 1949 and of the Norwegian Medical Association from 1948 to 1949. He died in May 1999.
