= Christian Lous Lange =

Norwegian diplomat and Nobel Peace Prize recipient (1869–1938)

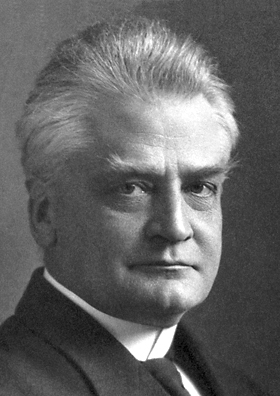
- Born: 17 September 1869; Stavanger, Sweden-Norway
- Died: 11 December 1938 (aged 69); Oslo, Norway
- Awards: Nobel Peace Prize (1921)

Christian Lous Lange (17 September 1869 – 11 December 1938) was a Norwegian historian, teacher, and political scientist. He was one of the world's foremost exponents of the theory and practice of internationalism.

== Early life and education ==
He was born in Stavanger; his father was a military engineer, and he was the grandson of the historian Christian C. A. Lange. He graduated from secondary school in 1887 and proceeded to travel and study history, English, and French at the University of Oslo, from which he received the cand. philol. degree in 1893. He taught at secondary schools for many years and eventually returned to the University of Oslo to receive a doctorate.

== Career ==
In 1899, he had his first official role in the internationalist movement when he was appointed secretary of the committee organizing an Oslo conference of the Inter-Parliamentary Union, an organization dedicated to fostering discussion between parliamentarians of different countries. The next year, he was made secretary of the Nobel Committee of the Norwegian Parliament and, although he gave up the position in 1909, he would play a key role in the early days of the Norwegian Nobel Institute. During this time, he was the Norwegian technical delegate to the Second Hague Peace Conference.

Lange rejoined the Inter-Parliamentary Union in 1909 when he was appointed secretary general of the organization, a position he would retain until 1933. As secretary general, he oversaw the Union's move to Brussels, sustained it in Oslo through the challenging times of World War I, then moved it again to Geneva after the war. He remained active in numerous other organizations as well, acting as Norway's delegate or alternate delegate to the League of Nations from its founding until 1938, writing reports and acting as a correspondent for the Carnegie Endowment for International Peace, and participating in the Dutch-sponsored Central Organisation for Durable Peace, among other activities. He was often called upon for his expertise in arbitration and arms control, in particular.

His intellectual support of internationalism was demonstrated by the first of a three-volume historical treatise (Histoire de l'internationalisme). The work, published in 1919, was said to contribute to the ideological preparation for the League of Nations. For this and all his other activities, Lange shared the Nobel Peace Prize with Hjalmar Branting in 1921.

== Personal life and death ==
Lange died at the age of 69, one day after the 17th anniversary of his receipt of the Nobel Prize. He was the father of Carl Viggo Manthey Lange, Halvard Lange and Christian August Manthey Lange.

His daughter Thora was a history and language teacher from 1938 at Oslo Cathedral School. During the occupation of Norway by Nazi Germany, she joined the resistance movement while her husband went into exile. She was imprisoned at Grini concentration camp in September 1943, but fell ill and died at Ullevål Hospital in December.

Lange was a member of the Norwegian Association for Women's Rights. Lange's Nobel Prize medal has been on long-term loan from his family to the Nobel Peace Center in Oslo since 2005. It is displayed in the centre's Medal Chamber.

== See also ==
- List of peace activists
