= August Lange =

Norwegian educator, non-fiction writer and cultural attaché

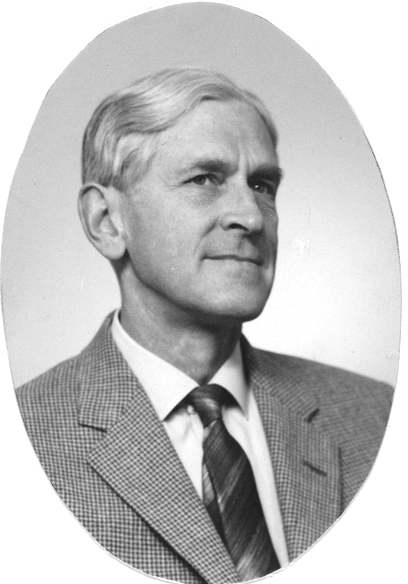
- Lange in 1962
- Born: 28 April 1907; Kristiania, Norway
- Died: 6 August 1970 (aged 63); Oslo, Norway
- Education: University of Oslo
- Occupations: Educator, non-fiction writer and cultural attaché.
- Parent: Christian Lous Lange
- Relatives: Halvard Lange (brother); Carl Viggo Lange (brother)

Christian August Manthey Lange (28 April 1907 – 6 August 1970) was a Norwegian educator, non-fiction writer and cultural attaché.

== Personal life ==
Lange was born in Kristiania, the son of politician and Nobel Laureate Christian Lous Lange (1869–1938) and his wife Bertha Manthey (1867–1947). He was a brother of politician and Minister of Foreign Affairs Halvard Lange, and of Parliament of Norway member Carl Viggo Manthey Lange. He spent part of his childhood in Brussels, where his father had a position as secretary-general of the Inter-Parliamentary Union.

== Career ==
Lange finished his secondary education in 1924, enrolled subsequently at the University of Oslo where he studied history, and graduated as cand.philol. in 1933. He worked as a teacher in Oslo from 1934. In 1939 he issued the history textbook 6000 år. Verdenshistorie for den høgre skolen, in cooperation with Nic. Stang.

=== World War II ===
Following the outbreak of World War II he participated in resistance work. He was arrested in June 1941 and held at Møllergata 19 until October 1941, at Grini concentration camp from October 1941 to April 1943, and at the Sachsenhausen concentration camp until the end of World War II. He issued the book 3 fra Sachsenhausen in 1945, together with Carl Johan Frederik Jakhelln and Olav Larssen, where he wrote the article "Ved livets grense" about Norwegian prisoners in Sachsenhausen. In 1946 and 1947 the two-volume book Griniboken was issued, edited by Lange and Johan Schreiner, with contributions from several of the prisoners at Grini. Lange's contribution is the chapter "Gamle Grini", where he gives an overview of the camp in the period he spent at Grini.

=== Post war ===
Lange was cultural attaché at the Norwegian embassy in Moscow from 1946 to 1948. From 1948 he worked as a teacher at Oslo offentlige lærerskole, and from 1953 he was head of Hamar lærerskole. He headed Statens lærerskoleklasser i Oslo from 1958. From 1962 he lectured at the University of Oslo. He died in 1970, by drowning in the lake Bogstadvannet in Oslo.
