= Halvard Lange =

Norwegian politician and diplomat (1902–1970)

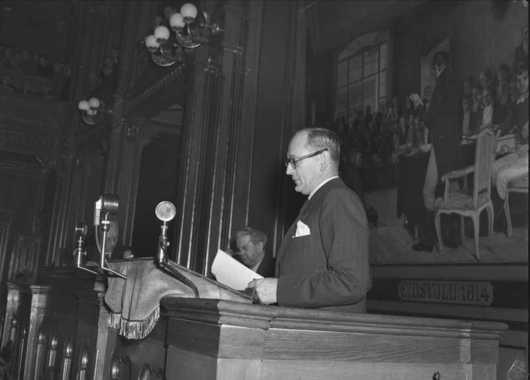
- Lange speaking in the Storting in 1949

Minister of Foreign Affairs
- In office 25 September 1963 – 12 October 1965
- Prime Minister: Einar Gerhardsen
- Preceded by: Erling Wikborg
- Succeeded by: John Lyng
- In office 2 February 1946 – 28 August 1963
- Prime Minister: Einar Gerhardsen; Oscar Torp
- Preceded by: Trygve Lie
- Succeeded by: Erling Wikborg

Member of the Norwegian Parliament
- In office 1 January 1950 – 30 September 1969
- Constituency: Akershus

Personal details
- Born: Halvard Manthey Lange; 16 September 1902 Kristiania, United Kingdoms of Sweden and Norway
- Died: 19 May 1970 (aged 67) Oslo, Norway
- Party: Labour
- Spouse(s): Karen Bøe (1930–1938); Aase Monsen (1939–1970; his death)
- Children: Even Lange

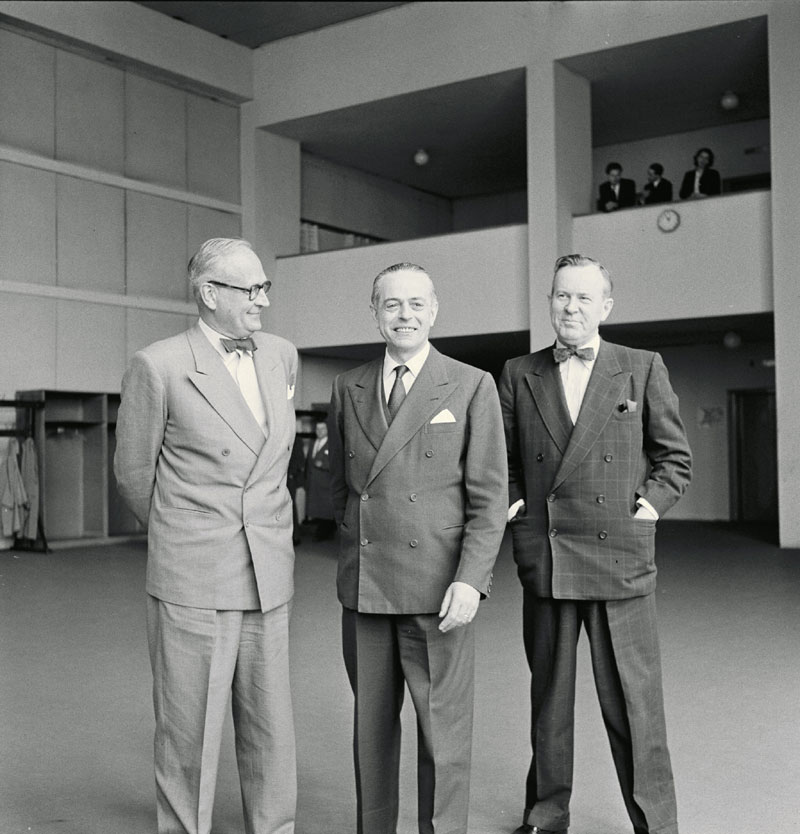
Halvard Lange, left, with Gaetano Martino and Lester B. Pearson, the "three wise men" of NATO, in 1956.

Halvard Manthey Lange (16 September 1902 – 19 May 1970) was a Norwegian politician and diplomat, who served as the Minister of Foreign Affairs from 1946-1963 and again from 1963-1965. He was also the longest serving Foreign Minister to date, having served a total of 19 years.

He became a member of the Labour Party in 1927. Two years later, in 1929, he earned a Master of Arts degree. He worked as a teacher 1930-35 and lectured at the University of Oslo 1935-38.

He was arrested by the Nazi German occupying forces in 1942 and spent the rest of the war in various concentration camps.

He was the Norwegian foreign minister from 1946 till 1965, except for a month in 1963 during the administration of John Lyng.

Just before taking the job of foreign minister, he became a member of the Norwegian Nobel Committee in 1945; although he went on leave in 1946, when he took up the foreign minister's job, he remained officially on the committee until 1948. He was viewed as "right-wing" politician in the Norwegian Labour Party, partially because of his strong support for Western alignment.

Lange was, together with Lester B. Pearson and Gaetano Martino, one of the "three wise men" on the "Committee of Three" advising NATO on ways to strengthen its non-military cooperation. A result of this work was the formation of the NATO Science Programme in 1957.

His father was Nobel Peace Prize winner Christian Lous Lange and his great-grandfather was the historian Christian C. A. Lange. His brother Carl Viggo also became a member of Parliament.

Political offices
Preceded by Trygve Lie	Minister of Foreign Affairs (Norway); 1946–1963	Succeeded by Erling Wikborg
Preceded by Erling Wikborg	Minister of Foreign Affairs (Norway); 1963–1965	Succeeded by John Lyng
