= 1901 Nobel Peace Prize =

Award

- Henri Dunant and Frédéric Passy
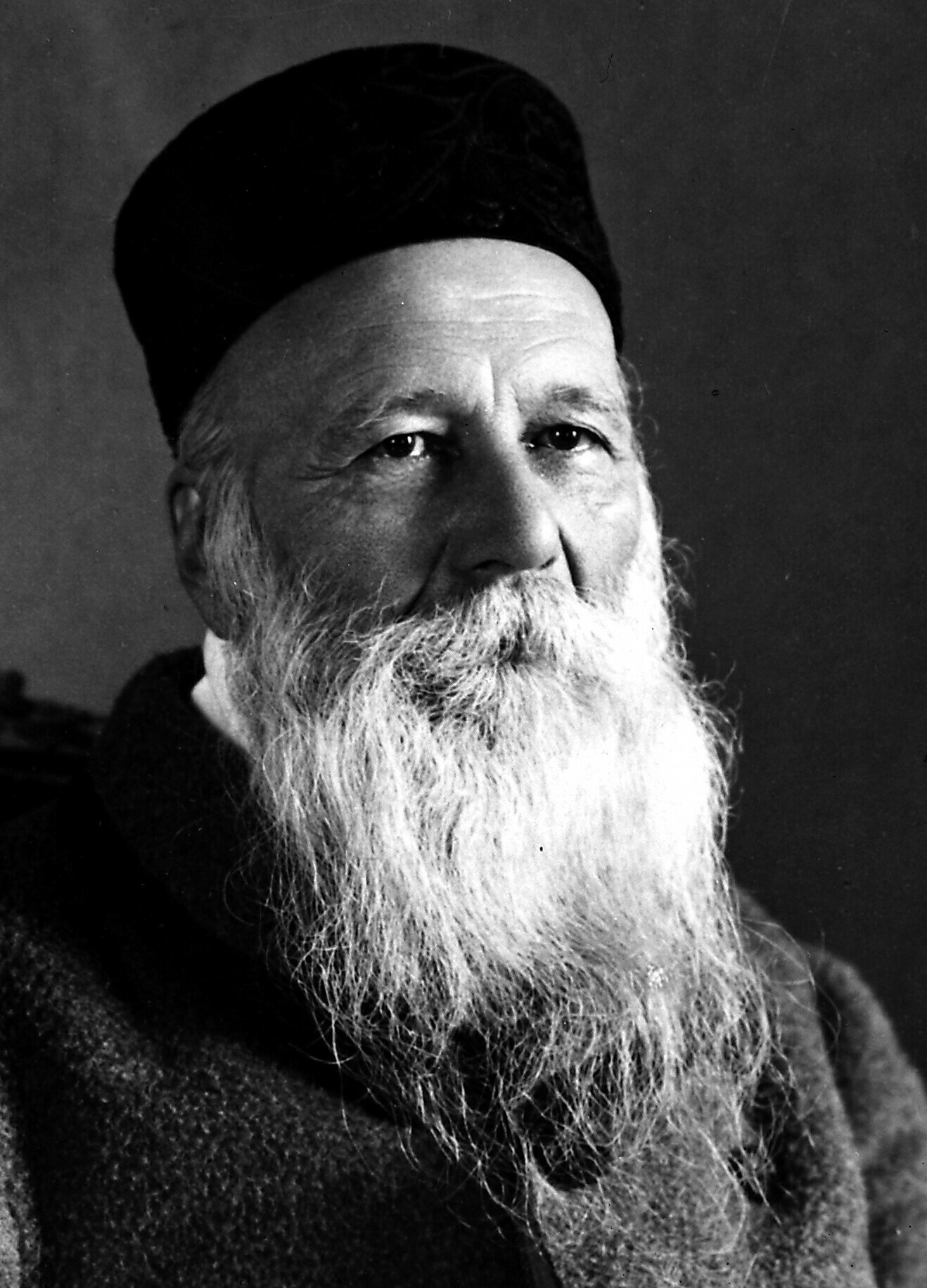
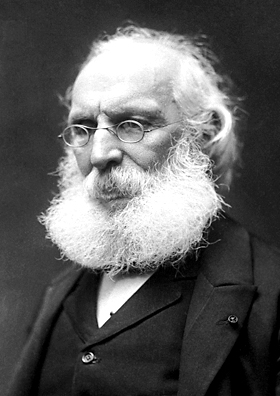
- Dunant "for his humanitarian efforts to help wounded soldiers and create international understanding" and Passy "for his lifelong work for international peace conferences, diplomacy and arbitration."
- Date: November 1901 (announcement); 10 December 1901 (ceremony)
- Location: Oslo, Norway
- Presented by: Norwegian Nobel Committee
- First award: 1901
- Website: Official website

The 1901 Nobel Peace Prize was the first peace prize resulting from Alfred Nobel's will to recognize in the preceding year those who "have done the most or the best work for fraternity between nations, for the abolition or reduction of standing armies and for the holding and promotion of peace congresses." It was equally divided between the Swiss humanitarian Henri Dunant (1828–1910) "for his humanitarian efforts to help wounded soldiers and create international understanding" and the French pacifist Frédéric Passy (1822–1912) "for his lifelong work for international peace conferences, diplomacy and arbitration." It was the first of the many times the Nobel Peace Prize has been shared between two or more individuals.

== Laureates ==
=== Jean-Henri Dunant ===
Witnessing the aftermath of the 1859 Battle of Solferino in Northern Italy, whereupon he saw thousands of Italian, French and Austrian soldiers killing and maiming each other, Henri Dunant, a Swiss businessman, took the initiative of establishing a neutral aid organization to help the sick and wounded on the battlefield. The result was the establishment of the International Committee of the Red Cross in 1863 with the assistance of jurist Gustave Moynier, army general Henri Dufour, and doctors Théodore Maunoir and Louis Appia – all would become the founding fathers of the Red Cross Committee – and the adoption of the Geneva Convention in the following year. It laid down the realization of Dunant's idea for an independent organization to care and rescue for wounded soldiers. Dunant write a book recording his experiences, Un Souvenir de Solferino ("A Memory of Solferino", 1862), which he uses as a reminder for his humanitarian advocacy and inspiration for his cause.

=== Frédéric Passy ===
As a prominent economist and politician, Frédéric Passy was involved in many pacifist causes. He founded the first French Peace Society, which held a congress in Paris during the 1878 World Exhibition and also was one of the founding fathers of the Inter-Parliamentary Union, an organization for cooperation between the elected representatives of different countries. As an independent leftist republic in the French Chamber of Deputies, he opposed France's colonial policy since it went against the principles of free trade and maintained that free trade between independent nations promoted peace. Passy continued to campaigning for peace despite his advanced age. Despite his economic works gaining little traction, his efforts in the peace movement resulted in him being recognized as the "dean of European peace activists".

== Deliberations ==
=== Nominations ===
Henri Dunant was nominated with 20 separate nominations from politicians, academics and heads of peace societies. Frédéric Passy, on the other hand, earned 42, making it the highest number of nominations for the year. In total, the newly formed Norwegian Nobel Committee received 137 nominations for 29 individuals and 6 organizations including Charles Albert Gobat and Élie Ducommun (both awarded in 1902), William Randal Cremer (awarded in 1903), Nicholas II of Russia, Herbert Spencer, Gustave Moynier, Leo Tolstoy, Fredrik Bajer (awarded in 1908), Friedrich Martens, The Institute of International Law (awarded in 1904) and Inter-Parliamentary Union. The Austrian author Bertha von Suttner (awarded in 1905) and American politician Belva Ann Lockwood were the first two women nominated for the peace prize.

Official list of nominees and their nominators for the prize
No.	Nominee	Country/ Headquarters	Motivations	Nominator(s)
Individuals
1	Fredrik Bajer (1837–1922)	Denmark	"Bajer promoted Nordic neutrality and brotherhood. He was one of the initiators and founders of the Permanent International Peace Bureau, and he was the first president of the Peace Bureau. He was also member of the council of the Inter-Parliamentary Union. He organized peace work both in Denmark and internationally, both popular peace movements and parliamentary peace work. He was Scandinavia's most prominent peace advocate."	Cornelius Bernhard Hanssen (1864–1939) (Note: Hanssen was a member of the Norwegian Nobel Committee from 1913 to 1939.)
1	Fredrik Bajer (1837–1922)	Denmark	"Bajer promoted Nordic neutrality and brotherhood. He was one of the initiators and founders of the Permanent International Peace Bureau, and he was the first president of the Peace Bureau. He was also member of the council of the Inter-Parliamentary Union. He organized peace work both in Denmark and internationally, both popular peace movements and parliamentary peace work. He was Scandinavia's most prominent peace advocate."	Sofus Høgsbro (1822–1902) (Note: Høgsbro nominated Bajer and Passy on behalf of the Danish Inter-Parliamentary Group.)
2	Konrad Beyer (1834–1906)	Germany	No motivation given for nomination.	Emil Jonas (?) (Note: Emil Jonas did not qualify as a nominator, but his nomination was supported by several letters from people who did qualify as nominators, including a declaration from Fr. von Balz, president of the Stuttgart Parliament.)
3	Jan Gotlib Bloch (1836–1902)	Russia (Poland)	"Bloch was nominated for his work The Future of War in its Technical, Economic and Political Relations (6 vols., 1898). One of his conclusions was that there would be no decisive victories in future land wars between great powers; the armies would entrench themselves and the ensuing deadlock would last for years. Armed conflict would be determined not by military success but by the eventual economic collapse of societies."	Michał Jan Rostworowski (1864–1940)
3	Jan Gotlib Bloch (1836–1902)	Russia (Poland)	"Bloch was nominated for his work The Future of War in its Technical, Economic and Political Relations (6 vols., 1898). One of his conclusions was that there would be no decisive victories in future land wars between great powers; the armies would entrench themselves and the ensuing deadlock would last for years. Armed conflict would be determined not by military success but by the eventual economic collapse of societies."	Costantino Nigra (1828–1907) (Note: Nigra and Lammasch wanted the Norwegian Nobel Committee to bestow an honorary peace award on Czar Nicholas II of Russia for his initiative that resulted in the 1899 Hague Peace Conference. In addition, they wished that the Nobel Committee would divide the prize money between some worthy peace workers, namely Frédéric Passy, Bertha von Suttner and Jan Gotlib Bloch.)
3	Jan Gotlib Bloch (1836–1902)	Russia (Poland)	"Bloch was nominated for his work The Future of War in its Technical, Economic and Political Relations (6 vols., 1898). One of his conclusions was that there would be no decisive victories in future land wars between great powers; the armies would entrench themselves and the ensuing deadlock would last for years. Armed conflict would be determined not by military success but by the eventual economic collapse of societies."	Samuel Baart de la Faille (1871–1917) (Note: Dr. de la Faille wanted to draw the Norwegian Nobel Committee's attention to the following candidates as worthy recipients of the peace prize: (1) the International Peace Bureau and Ducommun, (2) Passy, (3) Dunant, (4) Suttner, (5) Bloch, and (6) ten Kate)
3	Jan Gotlib Bloch (1836–1902)	Russia (Poland)	"Bloch was nominated for his work The Future of War in its Technical, Economic and Political Relations (6 vols., 1898). One of his conclusions was that there would be no decisive victories in future land wars between great powers; the armies would entrench themselves and the ensuing deadlock would last for years. Armed conflict would be determined not by military success but by the eventual economic collapse of societies."	Franciszek Kasparek (1844–1903)
3	Jan Gotlib Bloch (1836–1902)	Russia (Poland)	"Bloch was nominated for his work The Future of War in its Technical, Economic and Political Relations (6 vols., 1898). One of his conclusions was that there would be no decisive victories in future land wars between great powers; the armies would entrench themselves and the ensuing deadlock would last for years. Armed conflict would be determined not by military success but by the eventual economic collapse of societies."	Philippe Sagnac (1868–1954)
4	William Randal Cremer (1828–1908)	United Kingdom of Great Britain and Ireland	"Cremer established the International Arbitration League in 1870. He initiated an arbitration treaty between Great Britain and the United States. He organized and promoted inter-parliamentary peace conferences, and he was editor of the journal The Arbitrator. He was the only labor leader in the peace movement. He was also one of the founders of the Inter-Parliamentary Union."	Samuel van Houten (1837–1930)
4	William Randal Cremer (1828–1908)	United Kingdom of Great Britain and Ireland	"Cremer established the International Arbitration League in 1870. He initiated an arbitration treaty between Great Britain and the United States. He organized and promoted inter-parliamentary peace conferences, and he was editor of the journal The Arbitrator. He was the only labor leader in the peace movement. He was also one of the founders of the Inter-Parliamentary Union."	Philip James Stanhope (1847–1923) (Note: This nomination was supported by 105 members of the British Parliament.)
4	William Randal Cremer (1828–1908)	United Kingdom of Great Britain and Ireland	"Cremer established the International Arbitration League in 1870. He initiated an arbitration treaty between Great Britain and the United States. He organized and promoted inter-parliamentary peace conferences, and he was editor of the journal The Arbitrator. He was the only labor leader in the peace movement. He was also one of the founders of the Inter-Parliamentary Union."	Ernst Beckman (1850–1924)
4	William Randal Cremer (1828–1908)	United Kingdom of Great Britain and Ireland	"Cremer established the International Arbitration League in 1870. He initiated an arbitration treaty between Great Britain and the United States. He organized and promoted inter-parliamentary peace conferences, and he was editor of the journal The Arbitrator. He was the only labor leader in the peace movement. He was also one of the founders of the Inter-Parliamentary Union."	Albert Apponyi (1846–1933) (Note: Apponyi wanted his three candidates to share the peace prize, and to divide the prize money equally among them (Cremer 35%), Passy (35%) and Suttner (30%). Only Cremer and Passy were included on the short list.)
4	William Randal Cremer (1828–1908)	United Kingdom of Great Britain and Ireland	"Cremer established the International Arbitration League in 1870. He initiated an arbitration treaty between Great Britain and the United States. He organized and promoted inter-parliamentary peace conferences, and he was editor of the journal The Arbitrator. He was the only labor leader in the peace movement. He was also one of the founders of the Inter-Parliamentary Union."	37 members of the Swedish Parliament
4	William Randal Cremer (1828–1908)	United Kingdom of Great Britain and Ireland	"Cremer established the International Arbitration League in 1870. He initiated an arbitration treaty between Great Britain and the United States. He organized and promoted inter-parliamentary peace conferences, and he was editor of the journal The Arbitrator. He was the only labor leader in the peace movement. He was also one of the founders of the Inter-Parliamentary Union."	Włodzimierz Gniewosz (1838–1909) (Note: Pirquet and Gniewosz wanted the Norwegian Nobel Committee to bestow an honorary peace award on Czar Nicholas II of Russia for his initiative that resulted in the 1899 Hague Peace Conference. In addition, they wished that the Nobel Committee would divide the prize money between some worthy peace workers, namely William Randal Cremer, Édouard Descamps, Frédéric Passy and Bertha von Suttner.)
4	William Randal Cremer (1828–1908)	United Kingdom of Great Britain and Ireland	"Cremer established the International Arbitration League in 1870. He initiated an arbitration treaty between Great Britain and the United States. He organized and promoted inter-parliamentary peace conferences, and he was editor of the journal The Arbitrator. He was the only labor leader in the peace movement. He was also one of the founders of the Inter-Parliamentary Union."	Count Fr. Schönbrunn (?) (Note: Schönbrunn wanted the Norwegian Nobel Committee to bestow an honorary peace award on Czar Nicholas II of Russia for his initiative that resulted in the 1899 Hague Peace Conference. In addition, Schönbrunn wished that the Nobel Committee would divide the prize money between some worthy peace workers, namely William Randal Cremer, Frédéric Passy and Bertha von Suttner. Lange did not include this nomination among the official nominations. However, Schönbrunn was a member of the Arbitration Court at the Hague and he was thereby entitled to nominate a candidate for the peace prize.)
4	William Randal Cremer (1828–1908)	United Kingdom of Great Britain and Ireland	"Cremer established the International Arbitration League in 1870. He initiated an arbitration treaty between Great Britain and the United States. He organized and promoted inter-parliamentary peace conferences, and he was editor of the journal The Arbitrator. He was the only labor leader in the peace movement. He was also one of the founders of the Inter-Parliamentary Union."	Peter Pirquet (1838–1906)
4	William Randal Cremer (1828–1908)	United Kingdom of Great Britain and Ireland	"Cremer established the International Arbitration League in 1870. He initiated an arbitration treaty between Great Britain and the United States. He organized and promoted inter-parliamentary peace conferences, and he was editor of the journal The Arbitrator. He was the only labor leader in the peace movement. He was also one of the founders of the Inter-Parliamentary Union."	Heinrich Lammasch (1853–1920)
5	Édouard Descamps (1847–1933)	Belgium	"Descamps was nominated for his inter-parliamentary peace work. President of the sixth Inter-Parliamentary Peace Conference in Brussels in 1895, and Belgian delegate to the peace conference at The Hague in 1899. He was elected Secretary General of the Institute of International Law in 1900. He wrote significant works on neutrality and disarmament, and he also contributed to the abolitionist movement."	professors at the University of Louvain (Note: This nomination was supported by several jurists and politicians. One of the nominating professors was the former the Minister of Justice.)
5	Édouard Descamps (1847–1933)	Belgium	"Descamps was nominated for his inter-parliamentary peace work. President of the sixth Inter-Parliamentary Peace Conference in Brussels in 1895, and Belgian delegate to the peace conference at The Hague in 1899. He was elected Secretary General of the Institute of International Law in 1900. He wrote significant works on neutrality and disarmament, and he also contributed to the abolitionist movement."	Albert Apponyi (1846–1933) (Note: The evaluation of Descamps listed the Hungarian Inter-Parliamentary Group, led by Albert Apponyi, as one of the nominators. However, in the letter from this group there is no mention of Descamps, only of William Randal Cremer, Frédéric Passy and Bertha von Suttner.)
5	Édouard Descamps (1847–1933)	Belgium	"Descamps was nominated for his inter-parliamentary peace work. President of the sixth Inter-Parliamentary Peace Conference in Brussels in 1895, and Belgian delegate to the peace conference at The Hague in 1899. He was elected Secretary General of the Institute of International Law in 1900. He wrote significant works on neutrality and disarmament, and he also contributed to the abolitionist movement."	Peter Pirquet (1838–1906)
5	Édouard Descamps (1847–1933)	Belgium	"Descamps was nominated for his inter-parliamentary peace work. President of the sixth Inter-Parliamentary Peace Conference in Brussels in 1895, and Belgian delegate to the peace conference at The Hague in 1899. He was elected Secretary General of the Institute of International Law in 1900. He wrote significant works on neutrality and disarmament, and he also contributed to the abolitionist movement."	Ernest Lehr (1835–1919) (Note: Lehr only wished to nominate the Institute of International Law on condition that the Nobel Committee decided to give the prize to an institution. If the Nobel Committee decided to give the prize to a person, then he wished to nominate Chevalier Descamps.)
5	Édouard Descamps (1847–1933)	Belgium	"Descamps was nominated for his inter-parliamentary peace work. President of the sixth Inter-Parliamentary Peace Conference in Brussels in 1895, and Belgian delegate to the peace conference at The Hague in 1899. He was elected Secretary General of the Institute of International Law in 1900. He wrote significant works on neutrality and disarmament, and he also contributed to the abolitionist movement."	Thomas Erskine Holland (1835–1926)
5	Édouard Descamps (1847–1933)	Belgium	"Descamps was nominated for his inter-parliamentary peace work. President of the sixth Inter-Parliamentary Peace Conference in Brussels in 1895, and Belgian delegate to the peace conference at The Hague in 1899. He was elected Secretary General of the Institute of International Law in 1900. He wrote significant works on neutrality and disarmament, and he also contributed to the abolitionist movement."	António de Macedo Papança (1852–1913)
5	Édouard Descamps (1847–1933)	Belgium	"Descamps was nominated for his inter-parliamentary peace work. President of the sixth Inter-Parliamentary Peace Conference in Brussels in 1895, and Belgian delegate to the peace conference at The Hague in 1899. He was elected Secretary General of the Institute of International Law in 1900. He wrote significant works on neutrality and disarmament, and he also contributed to the abolitionist movement."	4 members of the German Parliament (Note: The nominators were: Engelberg-Maria von Ahrenberg (1872–1949), Hubert Sittart (1860–1942), Carl Becker (1863–1938) and Charles Régnault de Savigny (1836–1914))
5	Édouard Descamps (1847–1933)	Belgium	"Descamps was nominated for his inter-parliamentary peace work. President of the sixth Inter-Parliamentary Peace Conference in Brussels in 1895, and Belgian delegate to the peace conference at The Hague in 1899. He was elected Secretary General of the Institute of International Law in 1900. He wrote significant works on neutrality and disarmament, and he also contributed to the abolitionist movement."	Franz von Liszt (1851–1919)
5	Édouard Descamps (1847–1933)	Belgium	"Descamps was nominated for his inter-parliamentary peace work. President of the sixth Inter-Parliamentary Peace Conference in Brussels in 1895, and Belgian delegate to the peace conference at The Hague in 1899. He was elected Secretary General of the Institute of International Law in 1900. He wrote significant works on neutrality and disarmament, and he also contributed to the abolitionist movement."	Manuel Torres Campos (1850–1918)
5	Édouard Descamps (1847–1933)	Belgium	"Descamps was nominated for his inter-parliamentary peace work. President of the sixth Inter-Parliamentary Peace Conference in Brussels in 1895, and Belgian delegate to the peace conference at The Hague in 1899. He was elected Secretary General of the Institute of International Law in 1900. He wrote significant works on neutrality and disarmament, and he also contributed to the abolitionist movement."	Carl Goos (1835–1917)
5	Édouard Descamps (1847–1933)	Belgium	"Descamps was nominated for his inter-parliamentary peace work. President of the sixth Inter-Parliamentary Peace Conference in Brussels in 1895, and Belgian delegate to the peace conference at The Hague in 1899. He was elected Secretary General of the Institute of International Law in 1900. He wrote significant works on neutrality and disarmament, and he also contributed to the abolitionist movement."	Włodzimierz Gniewosz (1838–1909)
6	Élie Ducommun (1833–1906)	Switzerland	"Ducommun was the unpaid leader of the Permanent International Peace Bureau, and his work was therefore closely connected to it. He actively started working for peace in 1867 when he participated at the foundation of Ligue de la Paix et de la Liberté. He advocated a pragmatic and practical approach to peace work, and he promoted international arbitration."	Ludwig Stein (1859–1930) (Note: Stein nominated the Permanent International Peace Bureau as his first choice. Ducommun was his second choice.)
6	Élie Ducommun (1833–1906)	Switzerland	"Ducommun was the unpaid leader of the Permanent International Peace Bureau, and his work was therefore closely connected to it. He actively started working for peace in 1867 when he participated at the foundation of Ligue de la Paix et de la Liberté. He advocated a pragmatic and practical approach to peace work, and he promoted international arbitration."	Ellen Robinson (1840–1912)
6	Élie Ducommun (1833–1906)	Switzerland	"Ducommun was the unpaid leader of the Permanent International Peace Bureau, and his work was therefore closely connected to it. He actively started working for peace in 1867 when he participated at the foundation of Ligue de la Paix et de la Liberté. He advocated a pragmatic and practical approach to peace work, and he promoted international arbitration."	Henri Morel (1838–1912) (Note: Morel nominated Elie Ducommun as his primary choice. Secondly he suggested a divided prize to Ducommun and the Permanent International Peace Bureau. As a third alternative he suggested giving the prize to both Ducommun and Passy.)
6	Élie Ducommun (1833–1906)	Switzerland	"Ducommun was the unpaid leader of the Permanent International Peace Bureau, and his work was therefore closely connected to it. He actively started working for peace in 1867 when he participated at the foundation of Ligue de la Paix et de la Liberté. He advocated a pragmatic and practical approach to peace work, and he promoted international arbitration."	Samuel Baart de la Faille (1871–1917)
6	Élie Ducommun (1833–1906)	Switzerland	"Ducommun was the unpaid leader of the Permanent International Peace Bureau, and his work was therefore closely connected to it. He actively started working for peace in 1867 when he participated at the foundation of Ligue de la Paix et de la Liberté. He advocated a pragmatic and practical approach to peace work, and he promoted international arbitration."	3 professors at the University of Lausanne
6	Élie Ducommun (1833–1906)	Switzerland	"Ducommun was the unpaid leader of the Permanent International Peace Bureau, and his work was therefore closely connected to it. He actively started working for peace in 1867 when he participated at the foundation of Ligue de la Paix et de la Liberté. He advocated a pragmatic and practical approach to peace work, and he promoted international arbitration."	Lacheval (?) (Note: Lacheval fully supported Henri Morel's nomination, and he especially recommended Élie Ducommun as a worthy recipient of the Nobel Peace Prize.)
6	Élie Ducommun (1833–1906)	Switzerland	"Ducommun was the unpaid leader of the Permanent International Peace Bureau, and his work was therefore closely connected to it. He actively started working for peace in 1867 when he participated at the foundation of Ligue de la Paix et de la Liberté. He advocated a pragmatic and practical approach to peace work, and he promoted international arbitration."	Alfred Jeanhenry (1845–1902) (Note: Jeanhenry nominated three candidates: Élie Ducommun, The Permanent International Peace Bureau and Frédéric Passy. He especially recommended Élie Ducommun as a worthy recipient of the Nobel Peace Prize. Jeanhenry fully supported Henri Morel in his efforts to promote the candidacy of Ducommun, I.P.B.P. and Passy.)
7	Henri Dunant (1828–1910)	Switzerland	Dunant was one of the founders of the International Committee of the Red Cross and he was the initiator of the Geneva Convention.	Bernhard Getz (1850–1901) (Note: Getz nominated Dunant twice. He himself nominated Dunant in February 1901, and in March, he nominated Dunant on behalf of Norske Kvinders Sanitetsforening (The Norwegian Women's Sanitary Association). Jørgen Løvland became the new chairman of the Norwegian Nobel Committee and Hans Jacob Horst became a new member of the Committee. Getz died in 1901 before the committee had reached its decision as to who would receive the peace prize.)
7	Henri Dunant (1828–1910)	Switzerland	Dunant was one of the founders of the International Committee of the Red Cross and he was the initiator of the Geneva Convention.	Elias Sunde (1851–1910) (Note: Sunde endorsed a nomination initiated by Mrs. Liane Fyhn and the Alliance Universelle des Femmes Pour la Paix. Liane Fyhn emphasized the importance of the efforts conducted by Dunant and the Red Cross Committee.)
7	Henri Dunant (1828–1910)	Switzerland	Dunant was one of the founders of the International Committee of the Red Cross and he was the initiator of the Geneva Convention.	7 professors at the University of Amsterdam
7	Henri Dunant (1828–1910)	Switzerland	Dunant was one of the founders of the International Committee of the Red Cross and he was the initiator of the Geneva Convention.	92 members of the Swedish Parliament
7	Henri Dunant (1828–1910)	Switzerland	Dunant was one of the founders of the International Committee of the Red Cross and he was the initiator of the Geneva Convention.	40 members of the Württemberg Parliament
7	Henri Dunant (1828–1910)	Switzerland	Dunant was one of the founders of the International Committee of the Red Cross and he was the initiator of the Geneva Convention.	Samuel Baart de la Faille (1871–1917)
7	Henri Dunant (1828–1910)	Switzerland	Dunant was one of the founders of the International Committee of the Red Cross and he was the initiator of the Geneva Convention.	24 members of the Württemberg Parliament (Note: The nominators wished to promote the candidacies of Henri Dunant, Dr. Adolf Richter and Otto Umfrid, deputy chairman of the Deutsche Friedensgesellschaft.)
7	Henri Dunant (1828–1910)	Switzerland	Dunant was one of the founders of the International Committee of the Red Cross and he was the initiator of the Geneva Convention.	3 professors at the University of Brussels (Note: The professors were: Leclére, Vauder Rinsere and Pergameny.)
7	Henri Dunant (1828–1910)	Switzerland	Dunant was one of the founders of the International Committee of the Red Cross and he was the initiator of the Geneva Convention.	Ole Anton Qvam (1834–1904) (Note: Qvam endorsed a nomination initiated by Landskvinnestemmerettsforeningen (National Association for Female Suffrage). Qvam's wife Fredrikke Marie was president of said organization.)
7	Henri Dunant (1828–1910)	Switzerland	Dunant was one of the founders of the International Committee of the Red Cross and he was the initiator of the Geneva Convention.	Richard Kleen (1841–1923) (Note: Kleen nominated the Institute of International Law. However, in his letter to the Norwegian Nobel Committee, he stated that he would rather have nominated Henri Dunant and Gustave Moynier if it had been possible to do so. He believed that according to the peace prize statutes they did not qualify as candidates. In one of the paragraphs it is stated that the laureate will receive the peace prize for his or her accomplishments during the last year. Kleen stated that since Dunant and Moynier's lifelong peace work was the achievement of a lifetime and since he could not refer to any particular accomplishments of the last year, he reckoned that they did not qualify for the peace prize. He strongly believed that the two were the best candidates for the peace prize, and he regretted not being able to nominate them.)
8	Guglielmo Ferrero (1871–1942)	Italy	"Ferrero had given numerous lectures on militarism in Milan, and the lectures had been received with great acclaim by the people in Milan."	Ernesto Teodoro Moneta (1833–1918) (Note: Moneta nominated the Italian author Guglielmo Ferrero and the Permanent International Peace Bureau. The two nominations were submitted as individual nominations, and Moneta did not suggest a division of the prize between them.)
9	Charles Albert Gobat (1843–1914)	Switzerland	"Gobat was secretary-general of the Inter-Parliamentary Bureau, which had been established at the Inter-Parliamentary Union's conference in 1892. He was the Union's leading administrator, organizing its meetings and publishing proceedings from its conferences. He was particularly preoccupied with the idea of international arbitration, and he was central to the establishment of the Permanent Court of Arbitration at The Hague in 1899. He was also a member of the Permanent International Peace Bureau."	John Theodor Lund (1842–1913) (Note: John Lund also nominated the Inter-Parliamentary Union and William Stead.)
10	Edouard Linker (?)	Austria–Hungary	"for his thirty years in the service of the cause of peace and humanitarianism."	A. Vutkovitch (?) (Note: Among the documents Vutkovitch sent to the Nobel Committee were two sheets of music written by Linker. One was a peace hymn ("The Dawn of Peace"), and the other was a royal jubilee march written in commemoration of Emperor Franz Joseph I's silver jubilee.)
11	Belva Ann Lockwood (1830–1917)	United States	"Lockwood attended several international peace conferences. She supported Bajer in his work to found the Permanent International Peace Bureau, promoted arbitration and founded a branch of the Bureau in Washington. She was for a long time associated with the Universal Peace Union in Philadelphia. In 1879, Lockwood became the first woman allowed to practice before the U.S. Supreme Court. In 1884 and 1888, she ran for the U.S. presidency as candidate for the National Equal Rights Party."	members of the United States Senate
12	Eduard Loewenthal (1836–1917)	Germany	"Loewenthal was one of the earliest promoters of the necessity to establish a league of European states. He also promoted disarmament, reform of international law and the introduction of obligatory arbitration of disputes between states through an international system of "peace justice". He was instrumental in the founding of what was later known as the Inter-Parliamentary Union."	Hugo Hermes (1837–1915)
12	Eduard Loewenthal (1836–1917)	Germany	"Loewenthal was one of the earliest promoters of the necessity to establish a league of European states. He also promoted disarmament, reform of international law and the introduction of obligatory arbitration of disputes between states through an international system of "peace justice". He was instrumental in the founding of what was later known as the Inter-Parliamentary Union."	Albert Traeger (1830–1912)
13	Friedrich Martens (1845–1909)	Russia	"Martens advocated international arbitration and he also worked to establish a codification of the laws of war. He often acted as mediator in disputes between European states."	Henning Matzen (1840–1910)
13	Friedrich Martens (1845–1909)	Russia	"Martens advocated international arbitration and he also worked to establish a codification of the laws of war. He often acted as mediator in disputes between European states."	Edgar Rouard de Card (1853–1934)
13	Friedrich Martens (1845–1909)	Russia	"Martens advocated international arbitration and he also worked to establish a codification of the laws of war. He often acted as mediator in disputes between European states."	professors at the University of Zagreb
14	Gaetano (Umano) Meale (1858–1927)	Italy	"Umano was nominated for his writings on peace. He had written extensively on such subjects as war and peace, patriotism, and he had also constructed a 'law on patriotism'."	Malachia De Cristoforis (1832–1915)
15	Gustave Moynier (1826–1910)	Switzerland	"Moynier was one of the founders of the International Committee of the Red Cross, and he was nominated for his efforts to organize its work. He drafted the Geneva Conventions. He was also one of the founders of the Institute of International Law."	Richard Kleen (1841–1923)
16	Arthur Mülberger (1847–1907)	Germany	"Mülberger was nominated for his extensive thinking on war and peace, and especially for his book on P. J. Proudhon: Leben und Werke ("P. J. Proudhon: Life and Works", 1899), in which he expressed several ideas on how to deal with the issue of war and peace."	Friedrich Haussmann (1857–1907)
16	Arthur Mülberger (1847–1907)	Germany	"Mülberger was nominated for his extensive thinking on war and peace, and especially for his book on P. J. Proudhon: Leben und Werke ("P. J. Proudhon: Life and Works", 1899), in which he expressed several ideas on how to deal with the issue of war and peace."	Jean Allemane (1843–1935) (Note: Allemane used Mülberger's pen name N. J. Pierlin during the nomination.)
17	Czar Nicholas II of Russia	Russia	"Nicholas II initiated the first Hague Peace Conference in 1899. The Czar's intention was to seek agreements to limit armaments and the financial burden of excessive armament, and to improve the prospects of peaceful settlement of international conflicts and to codify the laws of war."	Count Fr. Schönbrunn (?)
17	Czar Nicholas II of Russia	Russia	"Nicholas II initiated the first Hague Peace Conference in 1899. The Czar's intention was to seek agreements to limit armaments and the financial burden of excessive armament, and to improve the prospects of peaceful settlement of international conflicts and to codify the laws of war."	Peter Pirquet (1838–1906)
17	Czar Nicholas II of Russia	Russia	"Nicholas II initiated the first Hague Peace Conference in 1899. The Czar's intention was to seek agreements to limit armaments and the financial burden of excessive armament, and to improve the prospects of peaceful settlement of international conflicts and to codify the laws of war."	Costantino Nigra (1828–1907)
17	Czar Nicholas II of Russia	Russia	"Nicholas II initiated the first Hague Peace Conference in 1899. The Czar's intention was to seek agreements to limit armaments and the financial burden of excessive armament, and to improve the prospects of peaceful settlement of international conflicts and to codify the laws of war."	Heinrich Lammasch (1853–1920)
17	Czar Nicholas II of Russia	Russia	"Nicholas II initiated the first Hague Peace Conference in 1899. The Czar's intention was to seek agreements to limit armaments and the financial burden of excessive armament, and to improve the prospects of peaceful settlement of international conflicts and to codify the laws of war."	Włodzimierz Gniewosz (1838–1909)
18	Beniamino Pandolfi Guttadauro (1836–1909)	Italy	"Pandolfi was nominated for his efforts to establish local peace associations (Venice and Turin) and the Italian Peace Society, and also for his inter-parliamentary peace work. He acted as mediator between Italy and Romania, and Italy and France, in an attempt to create greater understanding and a sense of brotherhood between these states."	Italian Inter-Parliamentary Group (Note: The name of the nominator is unclear. Inter-Parliamentary Group or Italian Peace Society? In the protocol, Christian Lous Lange gave the executive committee of the Italian Peace Society as nominators, whereas in the report to the Nobel Committee he listed the Italian Inter-Parliamentary Group as nominators. The Italian Peace Society was not entitled to nominate, but some of its members qualified as nominators because they were members of the Italian Parliament and the Italian Inter-Parliamentary Group. The nomination is missing from the archive at the Norwegian Nobel Institute. Pandolfi himself asked to borrow the documents concerning him and the secretary of the Norwegian Nobel Committee, Christian Lous Lange, obliged. The papers were probably never returned to the Norwegian Nobel Institute.)
19	Frédéric Passy (1822–1912)	France	"Passy's career as a peace worker began in 1856 with his opposition to the Crimean War. In 1867. he founded the first French Peace Society. He promoted free trade, pacifism, international law and arbitration. As a member of parliament (1881-1889), he also contributed to the founding of the Inter-Parliamentary Union."	Cornelius Bernhard Hanssen (1864–1939)
19	Frédéric Passy (1822–1912)	France	"Passy's career as a peace worker began in 1856 with his opposition to the Crimean War. In 1867. he founded the first French Peace Society. He promoted free trade, pacifism, international law and arbitration. As a member of parliament (1881-1889), he also contributed to the founding of the Inter-Parliamentary Union."	Sofus Høgsbro (1822–1902)
19	Frédéric Passy (1822–1912)	France	"Passy's career as a peace worker began in 1856 with his opposition to the Crimean War. In 1867. he founded the first French Peace Society. He promoted free trade, pacifism, international law and arbitration. As a member of parliament (1881-1889), he also contributed to the founding of the Inter-Parliamentary Union."	37 members of the Swedish Parliament
19	Frédéric Passy (1822–1912)	France	"Passy's career as a peace worker began in 1856 with his opposition to the Crimean War. In 1867. he founded the first French Peace Society. He promoted free trade, pacifism, international law and arbitration. As a member of parliament (1881-1889), he also contributed to the founding of the Inter-Parliamentary Union."	Albert Apponyi (1846–1933)
19	Frédéric Passy (1822–1912)	France	"Passy's career as a peace worker began in 1856 with his opposition to the Crimean War. In 1867. he founded the first French Peace Society. He promoted free trade, pacifism, international law and arbitration. As a member of parliament (1881-1889), he also contributed to the founding of the Inter-Parliamentary Union."	Ernst Beckman (1850–1924)
19	Frédéric Passy (1822–1912)	France	"Passy's career as a peace worker began in 1856 with his opposition to the Crimean War. In 1867. he founded the first French Peace Society. He promoted free trade, pacifism, international law and arbitration. As a member of parliament (1881-1889), he also contributed to the founding of the Inter-Parliamentary Union."	Samuel van Houten (1837–1930)
19	Frédéric Passy (1822–1912)	France	"Passy's career as a peace worker began in 1856 with his opposition to the Crimean War. In 1867. he founded the first French Peace Society. He promoted free trade, pacifism, international law and arbitration. As a member of parliament (1881-1889), he also contributed to the founding of the Inter-Parliamentary Union."	professors at the University of Zagreb
19	Frédéric Passy (1822–1912)	France	"Passy's career as a peace worker began in 1856 with his opposition to the Crimean War. In 1867. he founded the first French Peace Society. He promoted free trade, pacifism, international law and arbitration. As a member of parliament (1881-1889), he also contributed to the founding of the Inter-Parliamentary Union."	Alfred Jeanhenry (1845–1902)
19	Frédéric Passy (1822–1912)	France	"Passy's career as a peace worker began in 1856 with his opposition to the Crimean War. In 1867. he founded the first French Peace Society. He promoted free trade, pacifism, international law and arbitration. As a member of parliament (1881-1889), he also contributed to the founding of the Inter-Parliamentary Union."	5 members of the Swedish Parliament
19	Frédéric Passy (1822–1912)	France	"Passy's career as a peace worker began in 1856 with his opposition to the Crimean War. In 1867. he founded the first French Peace Society. He promoted free trade, pacifism, international law and arbitration. As a member of parliament (1881-1889), he also contributed to the founding of the Inter-Parliamentary Union."	Count Fr. Schönbrunn (?)
19	Frédéric Passy (1822–1912)	France	"Passy's career as a peace worker began in 1856 with his opposition to the Crimean War. In 1867. he founded the first French Peace Society. He promoted free trade, pacifism, international law and arbitration. As a member of parliament (1881-1889), he also contributed to the founding of the Inter-Parliamentary Union."	Peter Pirquet (1838–1906)
19	Frédéric Passy (1822–1912)	France	"Passy's career as a peace worker began in 1856 with his opposition to the Crimean War. In 1867. he founded the first French Peace Society. He promoted free trade, pacifism, international law and arbitration. As a member of parliament (1881-1889), he also contributed to the founding of the Inter-Parliamentary Union."	Costantino Nigra (1828–1907)
19	Frédéric Passy (1822–1912)	France	"Passy's career as a peace worker began in 1856 with his opposition to the Crimean War. In 1867. he founded the first French Peace Society. He promoted free trade, pacifism, international law and arbitration. As a member of parliament (1881-1889), he also contributed to the founding of the Inter-Parliamentary Union."	Heinrich Lammasch (1853–1920)
19	Frédéric Passy (1822–1912)	France	"Passy's career as a peace worker began in 1856 with his opposition to the Crimean War. In 1867. he founded the first French Peace Society. He promoted free trade, pacifism, international law and arbitration. As a member of parliament (1881-1889), he also contributed to the founding of the Inter-Parliamentary Union."	Włodzimierz Gniewosz (1838–1909)
19	Frédéric Passy (1822–1912)	France	"Passy's career as a peace worker began in 1856 with his opposition to the Crimean War. In 1867. he founded the first French Peace Society. He promoted free trade, pacifism, international law and arbitration. As a member of parliament (1881-1889), he also contributed to the founding of the Inter-Parliamentary Union."	Edvard Wavrinsky (1848–1924)
19	Frédéric Passy (1822–1912)	France	"Passy's career as a peace worker began in 1856 with his opposition to the Crimean War. In 1867. he founded the first French Peace Society. He promoted free trade, pacifism, international law and arbitration. As a member of parliament (1881-1889), he also contributed to the founding of the Inter-Parliamentary Union."	Michel M. Kebedgy (?)
19	Frédéric Passy (1822–1912)	France	"Passy's career as a peace worker began in 1856 with his opposition to the Crimean War. In 1867. he founded the first French Peace Society. He promoted free trade, pacifism, international law and arbitration. As a member of parliament (1881-1889), he also contributed to the founding of the Inter-Parliamentary Union."	Iakov Novikov (1849–1912)
19	Frédéric Passy (1822–1912)	France	"Passy's career as a peace worker began in 1856 with his opposition to the Crimean War. In 1867. he founded the first French Peace Society. He promoted free trade, pacifism, international law and arbitration. As a member of parliament (1881-1889), he also contributed to the founding of the Inter-Parliamentary Union."	A. Lainez (?)
19	Frédéric Passy (1822–1912)	France	"Passy's career as a peace worker began in 1856 with his opposition to the Crimean War. In 1867. he founded the first French Peace Society. He promoted free trade, pacifism, international law and arbitration. As a member of parliament (1881-1889), he also contributed to the founding of the Inter-Parliamentary Union."	Adolf Hedin (1834–1905)
19	Frédéric Passy (1822–1912)	France	"Passy's career as a peace worker began in 1856 with his opposition to the Crimean War. In 1867. he founded the first French Peace Society. He promoted free trade, pacifism, international law and arbitration. As a member of parliament (1881-1889), he also contributed to the founding of the Inter-Parliamentary Union."	Jules Clère (1850–1934)
19	Frédéric Passy (1822–1912)	France	"Passy's career as a peace worker began in 1856 with his opposition to the Crimean War. In 1867. he founded the first French Peace Society. He promoted free trade, pacifism, international law and arbitration. As a member of parliament (1881-1889), he also contributed to the founding of the Inter-Parliamentary Union."	Bertha von Suttner (1843–1914) (Note: Suttner also mentioned other possible candidates without specifically naming them as nominees for 1901. She wanted Passy, the oldest and most revered of the peace workers, to receive the first peace prize, and she also recommended a division of the prize in order to honor as many as the worthy candidates as possible. In addition, she wrote a lengthy letter about how she interpreted the notions in Alfred Nobel's will. She had been a friend of Nobel, and she wished to share her thoughts on the peace prize with the Norwegian Nobel Committee. Among others, she opposed the idea of giving the prize to an organization.)
19	Frédéric Passy (1822–1912)	France	"Passy's career as a peace worker began in 1856 with his opposition to the Crimean War. In 1867. he founded the first French Peace Society. He promoted free trade, pacifism, international law and arbitration. As a member of parliament (1881-1889), he also contributed to the founding of the Inter-Parliamentary Union."	Adolf Richter (1839–1914)
19	Frédéric Passy (1822–1912)	France	"Passy's career as a peace worker began in 1856 with his opposition to the Crimean War. In 1867. he founded the first French Peace Society. He promoted free trade, pacifism, international law and arbitration. As a member of parliament (1881-1889), he also contributed to the founding of the Inter-Parliamentary Union."	Henri Morel (1838–1912)
19	Frédéric Passy (1822–1912)	France	"Passy's career as a peace worker began in 1856 with his opposition to the Crimean War. In 1867. he founded the first French Peace Society. He promoted free trade, pacifism, international law and arbitration. As a member of parliament (1881-1889), he also contributed to the founding of the Inter-Parliamentary Union."	Gaston Moch (1859–1935) (Note: Moch wanted the peace prize to be divided between Passy and the Permanent International Peace Bureau.)
19	Frédéric Passy (1822–1912)	France	"Passy's career as a peace worker began in 1856 with his opposition to the Crimean War. In 1867. he founded the first French Peace Society. He promoted free trade, pacifism, international law and arbitration. As a member of parliament (1881-1889), he also contributed to the founding of the Inter-Parliamentary Union."	Sebastião de Magalhães Lima (1850–1928) (Note: Lima nominated Passy on behalf of Liga Portugueza de Paz.)
19	Frédéric Passy (1822–1912)	France	"Passy's career as a peace worker began in 1856 with his opposition to the Crimean War. In 1867. he founded the first French Peace Society. He promoted free trade, pacifism, international law and arbitration. As a member of parliament (1881-1889), he also contributed to the founding of the Inter-Parliamentary Union."	Henri La Fontaine (1854–1943)
19	Frédéric Passy (1822–1912)	France	"Passy's career as a peace worker began in 1856 with his opposition to the Crimean War. In 1867. he founded the first French Peace Society. He promoted free trade, pacifism, international law and arbitration. As a member of parliament (1881-1889), he also contributed to the founding of the Inter-Parliamentary Union."	Samuel Baart de la Faille (1871–1917)
19	Frédéric Passy (1822–1912)	France	"Passy's career as a peace worker began in 1856 with his opposition to the Crimean War. In 1867. he founded the first French Peace Society. He promoted free trade, pacifism, international law and arbitration. As a member of parliament (1881-1889), he also contributed to the founding of the Inter-Parliamentary Union."	Felix Graf von Bothmer (1852–1937)
19	Frédéric Passy (1822–1912)	France	"Passy's career as a peace worker began in 1856 with his opposition to the Crimean War. In 1867. he founded the first French Peace Society. He promoted free trade, pacifism, international law and arbitration. As a member of parliament (1881-1889), he also contributed to the founding of the Inter-Parliamentary Union."	Fredrik Bajer (1837–1922)
19	Frédéric Passy (1822–1912)	France	"Passy's career as a peace worker began in 1856 with his opposition to the Crimean War. In 1867. he founded the first French Peace Society. He promoted free trade, pacifism, international law and arbitration. As a member of parliament (1881-1889), he also contributed to the founding of the Inter-Parliamentary Union."	members of the French Parliament
19	Frédéric Passy (1822–1912)	France	"Passy's career as a peace worker began in 1856 with his opposition to the Crimean War. In 1867. he founded the first French Peace Society. He promoted free trade, pacifism, international law and arbitration. As a member of parliament (1881-1889), he also contributed to the founding of the Inter-Parliamentary Union."	members of the Académie des Sciences Morales et Politiques
20	Julian Pauncefote, 1st Baron Pauncefote (1828–1902)	Great Britain	"Pauncefote dealt successfully with the problems concerning seal fishing in the Bering Sea, the Venezuela Boundary Dispute, and the Panama Canal question (the Hay-Pauncefote Treaties 1899-1901). As a delegate to the First Hague Conference (1899), he was a leading figure in the formation of a permanent tribunal of arbitration."	John Theodor Lund (1842–1913)
21	Policarpo Petrocchi (1852–1902)	Italy	"for his pacifist work La Guerre ("The War", 1899)"	Alessandro Chiappelli (1857–1931)
22	Adolf Richter (1839–1914)	Germany	"Richter was chairman of the German Peace Association. One of the central figures of the early German peace movement. He attended international peace conferences and presided over the peace conference in Hamburg in 1897."	24 members of the Württemberg Parliament
23	Herbert Spencer (1820–1903)	Great Britain	No motivation given for nomination.	Carl Hilty (1833–1909)
24	William Thomas Stead (1849–1912)	Great Britain	"Stead promoted peace and international arbitration. He attended several peace conferences, including The Hague (1899) and Kristiania (1899). Stead instigated the so-called "Peace Crusade" in England and Scotland, and he published the journal War Against War in South Africa (1885). He believed that the best guarantee for world peace would be a peace treaty between Great Britain and Russia. Stead also agitated vigorously against the Second Boer War."	John Theodor Lund (1842–1913) (Note: John Lund also nominated the Inter-Parliamentary Union and Charles Albert Gobat. Stead was a passenger on the British transatlantic liner RMS Titanic when the ship struck an iceberg and sank in 1912, and he was one of the approximately 1,500 passengers who perished.)
25	Jan Jacob Lodewijk ten Kate (1850–1929)	Netherlands	No motivation given for nomination.	Samuel Baart de la Faille (1871–1917)
26	Bertha Sophie von Suttner (1843–1914)	Austria–Hungary	"Suttner was the author of the novel Die Waffen nieder! ("Lay Down Your Arms", 1889), the most important antiwar novel of the period. She was the founder and president of the Austrian Peace Society (1891), and she contributed to the foundation of the Permanent International Peace Bureau (1891). She was nominated for her contribution to the international peace movement."	E. N. Rahnsen (?)
26	Bertha Sophie von Suttner (1843–1914)	Austria–Hungary	"Suttner was the author of the novel Die Waffen nieder! ("Lay Down Your Arms", 1889), the most important antiwar novel of the period. She was the founder and president of the Austrian Peace Society (1891), and she contributed to the foundation of the Permanent International Peace Bureau (1891). She was nominated for her contribution to the international peace movement."	Albert Apponyi (1846–1933)
26	Bertha Sophie von Suttner (1843–1914)	Austria–Hungary	"Suttner was the author of the novel Die Waffen nieder! ("Lay Down Your Arms", 1889), the most important antiwar novel of the period. She was the founder and president of the Austrian Peace Society (1891), and she contributed to the foundation of the Permanent International Peace Bureau (1891). She was nominated for her contribution to the international peace movement."	professors at the University of Zagreb
26	Bertha Sophie von Suttner (1843–1914)	Austria–Hungary	"Suttner was the author of the novel Die Waffen nieder! ("Lay Down Your Arms", 1889), the most important antiwar novel of the period. She was the founder and president of the Austrian Peace Society (1891), and she contributed to the foundation of the Permanent International Peace Bureau (1891). She was nominated for her contribution to the international peace movement."	Ferenc Kemény (1860–1944)
26	Bertha Sophie von Suttner (1843–1914)	Austria–Hungary	"Suttner was the author of the novel Die Waffen nieder! ("Lay Down Your Arms", 1889), the most important antiwar novel of the period. She was the founder and president of the Austrian Peace Society (1891), and she contributed to the foundation of the Permanent International Peace Bureau (1891). She was nominated for her contribution to the international peace movement."	Samuel Baart de la Faille (1871–1917)
26	Bertha Sophie von Suttner (1843–1914)	Austria–Hungary	"Suttner was the author of the novel Die Waffen nieder! ("Lay Down Your Arms", 1889), the most important antiwar novel of the period. She was the founder and president of the Austrian Peace Society (1891), and she contributed to the foundation of the Permanent International Peace Bureau (1891). She was nominated for her contribution to the international peace movement."	Peter Pirquet (1838–1906)
26	Bertha Sophie von Suttner (1843–1914)	Austria–Hungary	"Suttner was the author of the novel Die Waffen nieder! ("Lay Down Your Arms", 1889), the most important antiwar novel of the period. She was the founder and president of the Austrian Peace Society (1891), and she contributed to the foundation of the Permanent International Peace Bureau (1891). She was nominated for her contribution to the international peace movement."	Włodzimierz Gniewosz (1838–1909)
26	Bertha Sophie von Suttner (1843–1914)	Austria–Hungary	"Suttner was the author of the novel Die Waffen nieder! ("Lay Down Your Arms", 1889), the most important antiwar novel of the period. She was the founder and president of the Austrian Peace Society (1891), and she contributed to the foundation of the Permanent International Peace Bureau (1891). She was nominated for her contribution to the international peace movement."	Heinrich Lammasch (1853–1920)
26	Bertha Sophie von Suttner (1843–1914)	Austria–Hungary	"Suttner was the author of the novel Die Waffen nieder! ("Lay Down Your Arms", 1889), the most important antiwar novel of the period. She was the founder and president of the Austrian Peace Society (1891), and she contributed to the foundation of the Permanent International Peace Bureau (1891). She was nominated for her contribution to the international peace movement."	Costantino Nigra (1828–1907)
26	Bertha Sophie von Suttner (1843–1914)	Austria–Hungary	"Suttner was the author of the novel Die Waffen nieder! ("Lay Down Your Arms", 1889), the most important antiwar novel of the period. She was the founder and president of the Austrian Peace Society (1891), and she contributed to the foundation of the Permanent International Peace Bureau (1891). She was nominated for her contribution to the international peace movement."	Count Fr. Schönbrunn (?)
27	Leo Tolstoy (Note: Tolstoy did not wish to receive a Nobel Prize. He stated that he would decline if he was awarded a prize.) (1828–1910)	Russia	No motivation given for nomination.	Carl Hilty (1833–1909)
28	Otto Umfrid (1857–1923)	Germany	"Umfried was chairman of the Stuttgart Peace Society and vice-president of the German Peace Society. He worked hard to change the attitude of the German evangelical clergy towards peace. He wrote and published numerous articles on peace. His major work was Europa den Europäern: Politische Ketzereien."	24 members of the Würtemberg Parliament
29	Louis-Léger Vauthier (Note: Another nominee (nominated in 1951) with the same surname have been merged with him at the nomination archive.) (1887–1963)	Switzerland	No motivation given for nomination.	C. Pajot (?)
Organizations
30	English Peace Society (founded in 1816)	London	No motivation given for nomination.	William Evans Darby (1844–1922) (Note: Darby pointed out that the English Peace Society had a claim on the Nobel Peace Prize, and he referred to several letters he had sent to Prime Minister Johannes Steen, who was also a member of the Norwegian Nobel Committee.)
31	Institute of International Law (IDI) (founded in 1873)	Ghent	"for its work to draft the first international arbitration regulations, and for its efforts to establish a codification of the laws of war."	Ernest Lehr (1835–1919)
31	Institute of International Law (IDI) (founded in 1873)	Ghent	"for its work to draft the first international arbitration regulations, and for its efforts to establish a codification of the laws of war."	Richard Kleen (1841–1923)
32	International Committee of the Red Cross (ICRC) (founded in 1863)	Geneva	"for its aim to help victims of war, both military personnel and civilians."	Alfred Martin (1839–1903)
33	Permanent International Peace Bureau (IPB) (founded in 1891)	Berlin	"The Peace Bureau organized peace conferences, and it collected and published peace literature. It was the heart of the European peace movement, and it coordinated the activities of the various national and non-governmental peace organizations."	Alfred Jeanhenry (1845–1902)
33	Permanent International Peace Bureau (IPB) (founded in 1891)	Berlin	"The Peace Bureau organized peace conferences, and it collected and published peace literature. It was the heart of the European peace movement, and it coordinated the activities of the various national and non-governmental peace organizations."	37 members of the Swedish Parliament
33	Permanent International Peace Bureau (IPB) (founded in 1891)	Berlin	"The Peace Bureau organized peace conferences, and it collected and published peace literature. It was the heart of the European peace movement, and it coordinated the activities of the various national and non-governmental peace organizations."	Ludwig Stein (1859–1930)
33	Permanent International Peace Bureau (IPB) (founded in 1891)	Berlin	"The Peace Bureau organized peace conferences, and it collected and published peace literature. It was the heart of the European peace movement, and it coordinated the activities of the various national and non-governmental peace organizations."	Gaston Moch (1859–1935)
33	Permanent International Peace Bureau (IPB) (founded in 1891)	Berlin	"The Peace Bureau organized peace conferences, and it collected and published peace literature. It was the heart of the European peace movement, and it coordinated the activities of the various national and non-governmental peace organizations."	Léon-Adrien de Montluc (1847–?)
33	Permanent International Peace Bureau (IPB) (founded in 1891)	Berlin	"The Peace Bureau organized peace conferences, and it collected and published peace literature. It was the heart of the European peace movement, and it coordinated the activities of the various national and non-governmental peace organizations."	Hodgson Pratt (1824–1907) (Note: Pratt recommended that the Permanent International Peace Bureau would receive annual support from the Norwegian Nobel Committee and thereby secure the Peace Bureau's continued existence. He reckoned that the tireless peace efforts of the Peace Bureau and its general secretary Élie Ducommun deserved recognition in the form of a secure financial foundation at the core of the Peace Bureau's peace work. Pratt contributed to the founding of the Permanent International Peace Bureau.)
33	Permanent International Peace Bureau (IPB) (founded in 1891)	Berlin	"The Peace Bureau organized peace conferences, and it collected and published peace literature. It was the heart of the European peace movement, and it coordinated the activities of the various national and non-governmental peace organizations."	Ernesto Teodoro Moneta (1833–1918)
33	Permanent International Peace Bureau (IPB) (founded in 1891)	Berlin	"The Peace Bureau organized peace conferences, and it collected and published peace literature. It was the heart of the European peace movement, and it coordinated the activities of the various national and non-governmental peace organizations."	Émile Arnaud (1864–1921)
33	Permanent International Peace Bureau (IPB) (founded in 1891)	Berlin	"The Peace Bureau organized peace conferences, and it collected and published peace literature. It was the heart of the European peace movement, and it coordinated the activities of the various national and non-governmental peace organizations."	Henri Morel (1838–1912)
33	Permanent International Peace Bureau (IPB) (founded in 1891)	Berlin	"The Peace Bureau organized peace conferences, and it collected and published peace literature. It was the heart of the European peace movement, and it coordinated the activities of the various national and non-governmental peace organizations."	Samuel Baart de la Faille (1871–1917)
34	Inter-Parliamentary Union (founded in 1889)	Geneva	"The Inter-Parliamentary Union promoted international arbitration and organized annual inter-parliamentary conferences."	U.S. Inter-Parliamentary Group (Note: Christian Lous Lange, secretary of the Norwegian Nobel Committee, lists the American Inter-Parliamentary Group, the Belgian Inter-Parliamentary Group and the Portuguese Inter-Parliamentary Group among the nominators who nominated the Inter-Parliamentary Union. However, there are no mention of these three nominations in the protocol in which Lange recorded all the incoming nominations. It is possible that these nominations were submitted and not recorded, or that the nominations were submitted orally either to Lange or to one of the committee members and therefore they were not recorded in the protocol. Most of the IPU's nominators nominated either the Inter-Parliamentary Union or the Inter-Parliamentary Bureau or both. Christian Lous Lange, secretary of the Norwegian Nobel Committee, regarded the Union and the Bureau as one candidate; the Bureau was the executive body of the Union. The nominators wished to reward the I.P.U. and its Bureau with a Nobel Peace Prize for its accomplishments so far and to provide the I.P.U. with means to develop the organization and to guarantee the continued existence of the I.P.U.)
34	Inter-Parliamentary Union (founded in 1889)	Geneva	"The Inter-Parliamentary Union promoted international arbitration and organized annual inter-parliamentary conferences."	Belgian Inter-Parliamentary Group
34	Inter-Parliamentary Union (founded in 1889)	Geneva	"The Inter-Parliamentary Union promoted international arbitration and organized annual inter-parliamentary conferences."	Portuguese Inter-Parliamentary Group
34	Inter-Parliamentary Union (founded in 1889)	Geneva	"The Inter-Parliamentary Union promoted international arbitration and organized annual inter-parliamentary conferences."	Charles Albert Gobat (1843–1914)
34	Inter-Parliamentary Union (founded in 1889)	Geneva	"The Inter-Parliamentary Union promoted international arbitration and organized annual inter-parliamentary conferences."	Eugène Richard (1843–1925)
34	Inter-Parliamentary Union (founded in 1889)	Geneva	"The Inter-Parliamentary Union promoted international arbitration and organized annual inter-parliamentary conferences."	John Theodor Lund (1842–1913)
34	Inter-Parliamentary Union (founded in 1889)	Geneva	"The Inter-Parliamentary Union promoted international arbitration and organized annual inter-parliamentary conferences."	Hans Jacob Horst (1848–1931)
34	Inter-Parliamentary Union (founded in 1889)	Geneva	"The Inter-Parliamentary Union promoted international arbitration and organized annual inter-parliamentary conferences."	Carl Ludwig von Bar (1836–1913)
35	Societá Interregionale per la Pace, Unione Lombarda	Milan	"The Società interregionale per la pace, Unione Lombarda, was nominated for its efforts to peace and peace issues."	Edoardo Porro (1842–1902)

== Norwegian Nobel Committee ==
The following members of the Norwegian Nobel Committee appointed by the Storting were responsible for the selection of the 1901 Nobel laureate in accordance with the will of Alfred Nobel:

1901 Norwegian Nobel Committee
Picture	Name	Position	Political Party	Other posts
	Jørgen Løvland (1848–1922)	Chairman	Liberal	Minister of Labour (1900–1903)
	John Theodor Lund (1842–1913)	Member	Liberal	former President of the Lagting (1893–1900)
	Bjørnstjerne Bjørnson (1832–1910)	Member	Liberal	National Poet laureate; 1903 Nobel Prize laureate in Literature
	Johannes Steen (1827–1906)	Member	Liberal	6th Prime Minister of Norway (1898–1902); Minister of the Interior (1900–1902)
	Hans Jacob Horst (1848–1931)	Member	Liberal	President of the Lagting (1900–1903)
