= Henri Morel =

Henri Morel may refer to:

- Henri Morel (Canadian politician) (1867–1934), Ontario butcher and political figure
- Henri Morel (Swiss politician) (1838–1912), President of the Swiss National Council
