= John Lund =

John Lund is the name of:

- John Lund (actor) (1911–1992), American actor
- John Lund (conductor) (1859–1925), German-born American conductor and composer
- John Lund (racing driver) (born 1954), British racing driver
- John Theodor Lund (1842–1913), Norwegian Liberal Party politician
- John Walter Guerrier Lund (1912–2015), English scientist
