= Bezzola =

Bezzola is a surname. Notable people with the surname include:

- Andrea Bezzola (1840–1897), Swiss jurist and politician
- Manuela Bezzola (born 1989), Swiss taekwondo practitioner
