= Ferenc Kemény =

Ferenc Kemény may refer to:

- Ferenc Kemény (chancellor) (1795–1875), Hungarian Chancellor and President of the Transylvanian Diet
- Ferenc Kemény (sports manager) (1860–1944), Hungarian sports manager
- Ferenc Kemény (linguist) (1917–2008), Hungarian linguist
- Ferenc Kemény (gymnast) (1922–2002), Hungarian gymnast
