= Correspondance bi-mensuelle =

Pacifist magazine in Switzerland (1892–1940)

- Categories: Political magazine
- Frequency: Biweekly
- Founder: Permanent International Peace Bureau
- Founded: 1892
- Final issue: January/February 1940
- Country: Switzerland
- Based in: Bern
- Language: French
- OCLC: 40372665

Correspondance bi-mensuelle was a magazine which was established by the Permanent International Peace Bureau in 1892. It existed until 1940 under the title Le Mouvement pacifiste. The magazine was headquartered in Bern, Switzerland.

== History and profile ==
Correspondance bi-mensuelle was started by the Permanent International Peace Bureau in 1892 to reinforce the collaboration between peace organizations in different countries. From 1895 Swiss author Élie Ducommun became its director. In January 1912 it was renamed as Le Mouvement pacifiste (French: The Peace Movement), and the Permanent International Peace Bureau became the International Peace Bureau.

The magazine came out biweekly and was headquartered in Bern. Its publisher from 1915 was Büchler. It folded following the publication of the issue dated January/February 1940.
