= Damsgård Manor =

Coordinates: 60°22′59.97″N 5°18′7.6″E

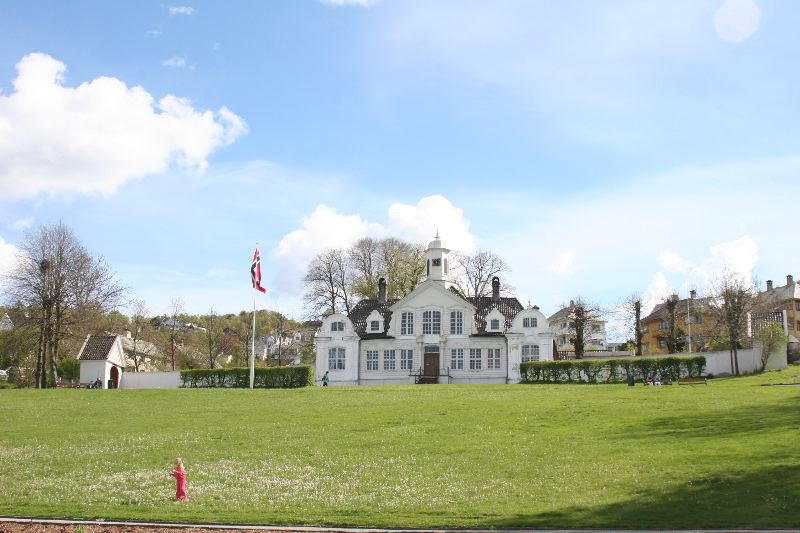

- Location within Norway

General information
- Type: Manor
- Architectural style: Rococo
- Location: Laksevåg, Bergen, Norway
- Completed: Around 1770

Damsgård Manor (Norwegian: Damsgård hovedgård) is a landmark manor and estate in Bergen, Norway. It is noted for its distinct rococo style and is possibly the best preserved wooden building from 18th-century Europe.

== History ==
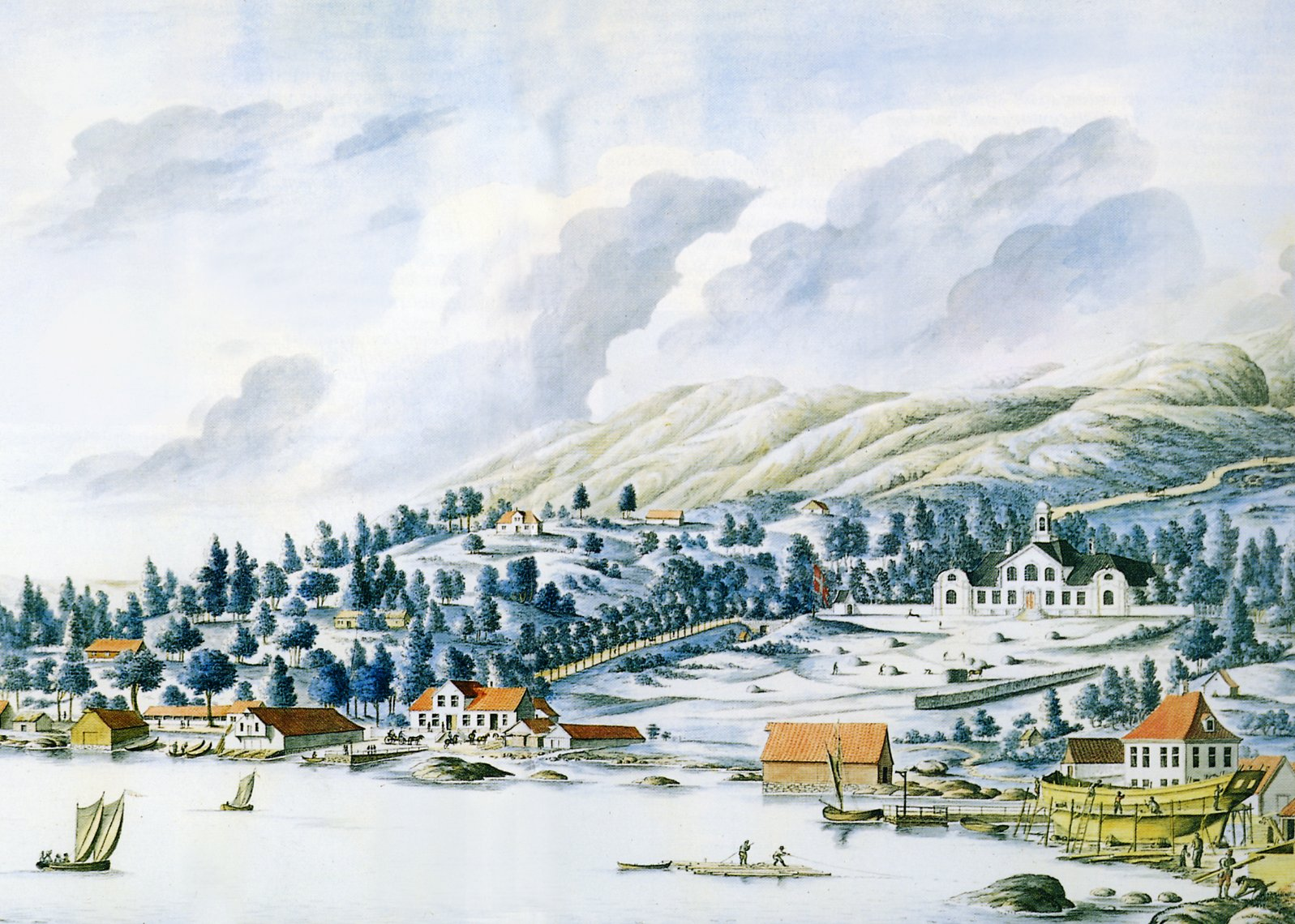
Damsgård hovedgård Johan F. L. Dreier (1810)

The area surrounding the manor was most likely populated during the Viking Age or earlier, but literary evidence shows it was a population center in 1427, listed as church property. Following the Reformation in 1536, the estate was taken over by the crown and then sold to foreign interests.

The name is most likely derived from Dam Tønneson, who in 1654 inherited the farm from his father Tønnes Klausson, who in turn received it from Frederick II of Denmark due to his service during the Northern Seven Years' War. The oldest sections of the structure, however, are probably from around 1720, when Severin Seehusen (1664-1726) owned the estate. At the time, the buildings were painted bright red and green. An estimate for the main house from 1731 exists and indicates the general layout of the structure. By all accounts, the estate was a year-round farm and a recreational property.

Joachim Christian Geelmuyden Gyldenkrantz (1730-1795), later knighted Gyldenkrantz, took over the farm in 1769 and quickly began the Rococo construction that exists to this day. He also rebuilt the main house to face the maritime approach to Bergen. Shortly after Gyldenkrantz died, the property was sold to Herman Didrich Janson, one of the wealthiest men of his time. He only completed minor external changes but thoroughly renovated the interior of the houses. The Janson family maintained ownership of the estate until 1983, when it was taken over by Vestlandske kunstindustrimuseum, which embarked on a 10-year restoration effort, in collaboration with the Directorate for Cultural Heritage in Norway. It was put on the protected list, and Bergen Museum took over the estate.

== Architecture ==
Damsgård is one of the few buildings of the rococo architectural style in Norway, and is unusual as a rococo wooden structure in Europe. The facade of the main building exaggerates the dimensions of the house itself, and two windows are painted on to create symmetry. The building's interior layout has been restored to its original, early 18th century plan, and the interior to the different eras of Damsgård's history.

The estate has two gardens inside its walls and one outside. The eastern garden, located inside the walls, is known as the "Master's garden", the western garden, also located inside the walls, is known as the "Mistress's garden", while the garden outside the walls is known as the "English garden". After decades of deterioration, the gardens were restored to their 18th century state in 1998. Botanists from the University of Bergen helped decide which vegetables and flowers would be grown to make them as much like the original gardens as possible.

The eastern garden, also known as the Lord's garden, is strictly symmetric, with six squares of plants and pathways of white shingle. The western garden, known as the Lady's garden, is far less symmetric, with two ponds and a small statue of Neptune spouting water into one of the ponds. Both these gardens are surrounded by walls. This is not the case with the English garden. Laid out in the 18th century, it only became an English garden around 1830. This garden contains a small stream and a path, and is open all year.

== Museum ==
The museum of Damsgård is open to the public by tour only. It is located on Alléen 29, in Laksevåg.

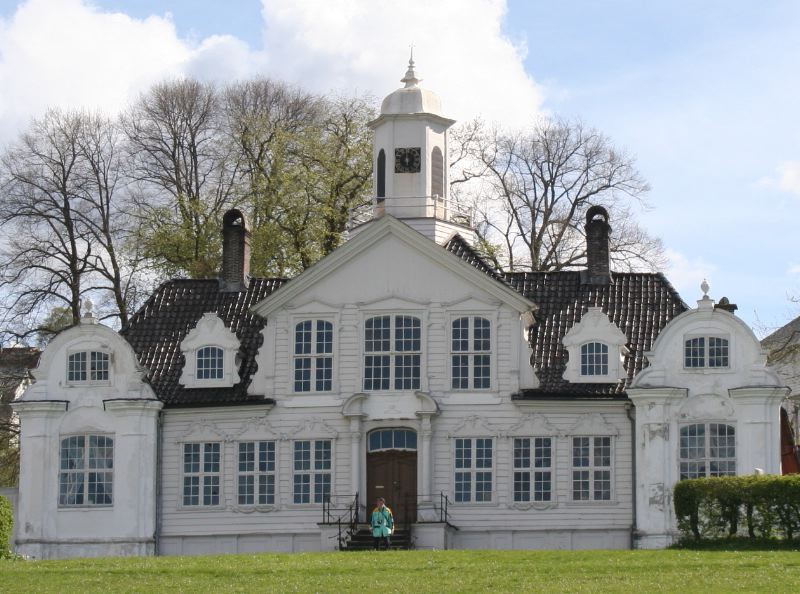
Damsgård Manor

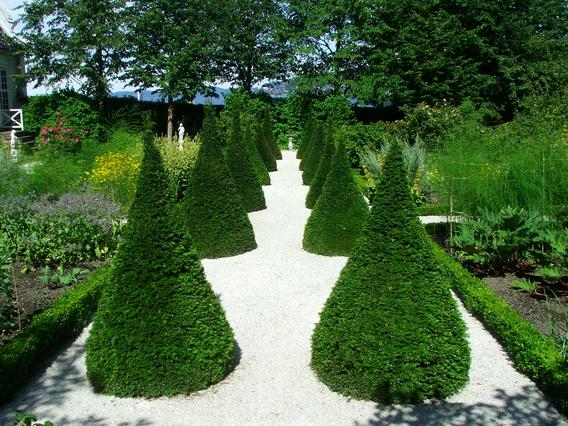
Lord's garden

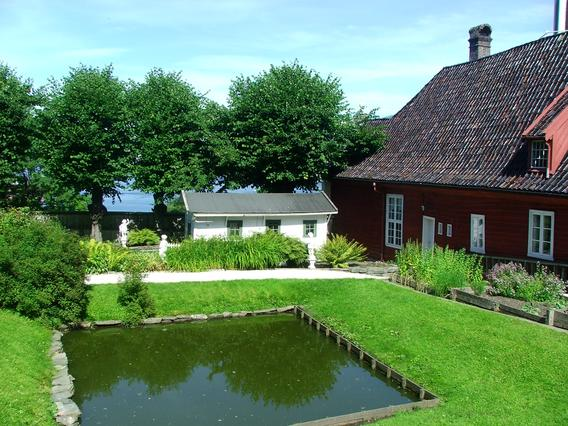
Mistress's garden

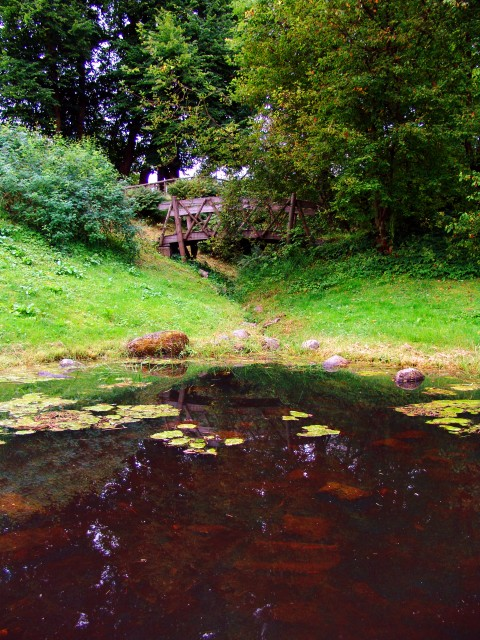
English garden
