= Andrea Bezzola =

Swiss jurist and politician

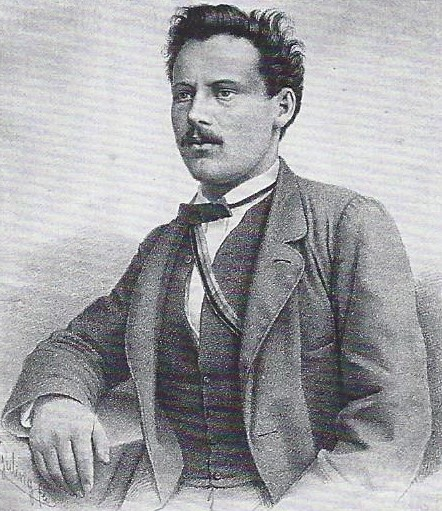
Andrea Bezzola

Andrea Bezzola (19 April 1840 in Zernez – 10 January 1897 in Zürich) was a Swiss jurist, politician and President of the Swiss National Council (1885/1886).

Preceded by Johannes Stössel	President of the National Council; 1885/1886	Succeeded by Henri Morel
