= John Theodor Lund =

Norwegian Liberal Party politician (1842–1913)

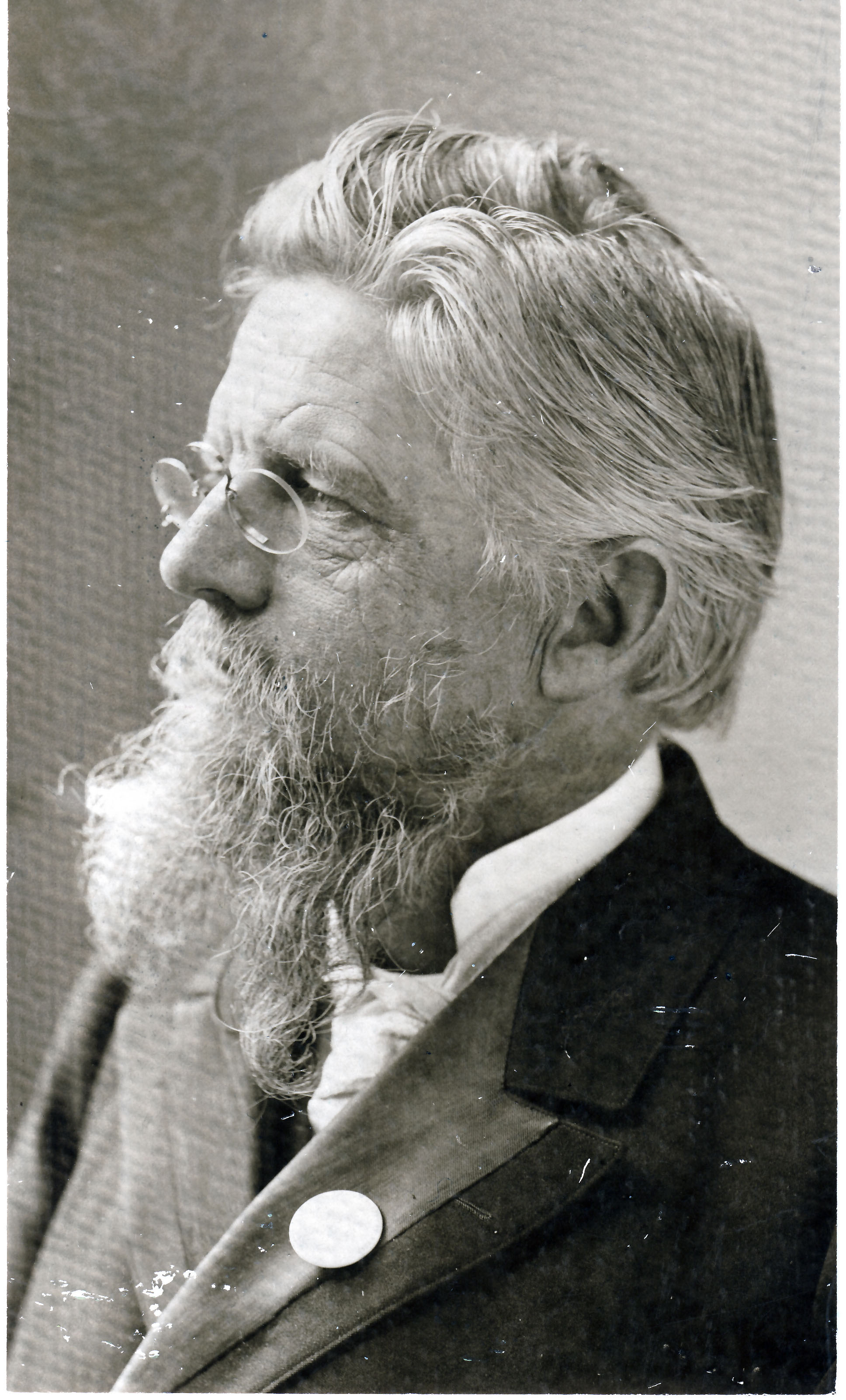
John Theodor Lund

John Theodor Lund (9 October 1842 – 8 January 1913) was a Norwegian politician for the Liberal Party.

== Background ==
Lund was born in Bergen, Norway. He was the son of Eilert Theodor Lund (1815-1893) and Ellen Albertine Knutsen (1816-1883). Lund was a co-owner and editor of the newspaper Bergens Tidende which was founded in 1868. He was elected to the city council of Bergen in 1879 and was mayor from 1888 to 1890. Lund was chairman of the Norwegian Constitution Day committee of Bergen from 1876 until his death in 1913. From 1896 he was manager of Norges Bank office in Bergen.

== Political career ==
He was a local politician in Bergen for thirty years before becoming a member of parliament from 1883 to 1885 and from 1892 to 1900. He was President of the Lagting from 1893 to 1900. He was a delegate to several Inter-Parliamentary Union conferences and a member of the Norwegian Nobel Committee from 1901 to 1912.

== Personal life ==
In 1870, he married Georgine Johanne Janson who was the daughter of merchant and Helmich Janson (1804-1868) and Constance Frederikke Sophie Neumann (1808-1880]. His wife was the granddaughter of Herman Didrich Janson (1757-1822) and sister of Unitarian clergyman Kristofer Janson (1841-1917). Lund and his wife were the parents of one son and of four daughters.
