= Hans Jacob Horst =

Norwegian politician (1848–1931)

Hans Jacob Horst (7 November 1848 – 17 March 1931) was a Norwegian politician for the Liberal Party. He graduated with a master's degree in liberal arts in 1874, becoming a teacher and later principal. He became active in the Liberal Union and the Workers' Union in Tromsø in 1881, and was then elected to the municipal council. He was one of the founders of the newspaper Nordposten. He sat in the Parliament of Norway from 1889 to 1903 and from 1906 to 1909, when he sat in the Ecclesiastical Affairs Committee. He was President of the Odelsting from 1892 to 1900 and President of the Lagting from 1900 to 1903. He was chair of the parliament Peace Association from 1900 and a member of the International Court of Arbitration in The Hague from 1906 to 1929. He was a member of the Norwegian Nobel Committee from 1903 to 1931.
