= Charles Albert Gobat =

Swiss politician, lawyer and educational administrator (1843–1914)

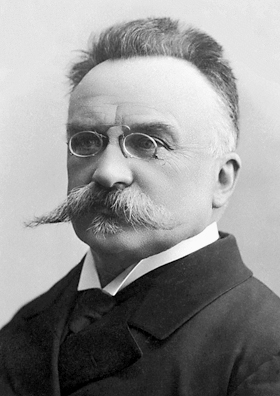
- Born: 21 May 1843; Tramelan, Switzerland
- Died: 16 March 1914 (aged 70); Bern, Switzerland
- Occupations: Lawyer; educational administrator; politician
- Awards: Nobel Peace Prize (1902)

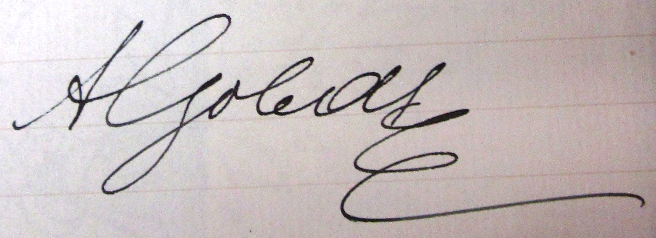
Signature

Charles Albert Gobat (French pronunciation: [ʃaʁl albɛʁ ɡɔba]; 21 May 1843 – 16 March 1914) was a Swiss lawyer, educational administrator, and politician who jointly received the Nobel Peace Prize with Élie Ducommun in 1902 for their leadership of the Permanent International Peace Bureau.

== Birth and education ==
Gobat was born on 21 May 1843 at Tramelan, Switzerland. He was the son of a Protestant pastor and the nephew of Samuel Gobat, a missionary who became bishop of Jerusalem. He was educated at the University of Basel, University of Heidelberg, University of Bern, and University of Paris. He received his doctorate in law, summa cum laude, from the University of Heidelberg in 1867.

== Career in law and politics ==
After completing his Ph.D., Gobat began his practicing law in Bern and also lectured on French civil law at Bern University. He then opened an office in Delémont in the canton of Bern, which soon became the leading legal firm of the district.

After practicing law for fifteen years, he became involved in politics and education. In 1882, he was appointed superintendent of public instruction for the canton of Bern, a position he held for thirty years. He was a progressive in educational philosophy and he made many important reforms in the education system. He reformed the system of primary training, obtained increased budgetary support to improve the teacher-pupil ratio, supported the study of living languages, and provided pupils with an alternative to the traditionally narrow classical education by establishing curricula in vocational and professional training.

He won acclaim for his erudite République de Berne et la France pendant les guerres de religion, which was published in 1891 and also widespread recognition for A People's History of Switzerland, which was published in 1900.

He also pursued a career in politics. He was elected to the Grand Council of Bern in 1882. From 1884 to 1890, he was a member of the Council of States of Switzerland and from 1890 until his death in 1914, he was a member of the National Council, the other chamber of the central Swiss legislative body. In both politics and education, he was a liberal reformer. In 1902, he sponsored several legislation that applied the principle of arbitration to commercial treaties. Gobat worked with the Inter-Parliamentary Union, which was founded by William Randal Cremer, the winner of the Nobel Peace Prize in 1903, in 1889. In 1892, he became the president of the union's fourth conference, which was held in Bern and founded the Bureau Interparlementaire. He served as general secretary of the bureau, an information office dealing with peace movements, international conciliation, and communication among national parliamentary bodies. The third conference of the union, held in Rome in 1891, established the International Peace Bureau, of which Gobat was director when it was awarded the Nobel Peace Prize in 1910.

== Later years ==
In 1902, Gobat jointly received the Nobel Peace Prize in 1902 with Élie Ducommun for their leadership of the Permanent International Peace Bureau.

After the death of Élie Ducommun in 1906, Gobat took over the direction of the International Peace Bureau.

Gobat died on 16 March 1914 in Bern, Switzerland. While attending meeting of the peace conference at Bern, he arose as if to speak but collapsed, dying about an hour later.

== External links and references ==
- Charles Albert Gobat on Nobelprize.org including the Nobel Lecture, July 18, 1906 The Development of the Hague Conventions of July 29, 1899
