= Élie Ducommun =

Swiss peace activist (1833–1906)

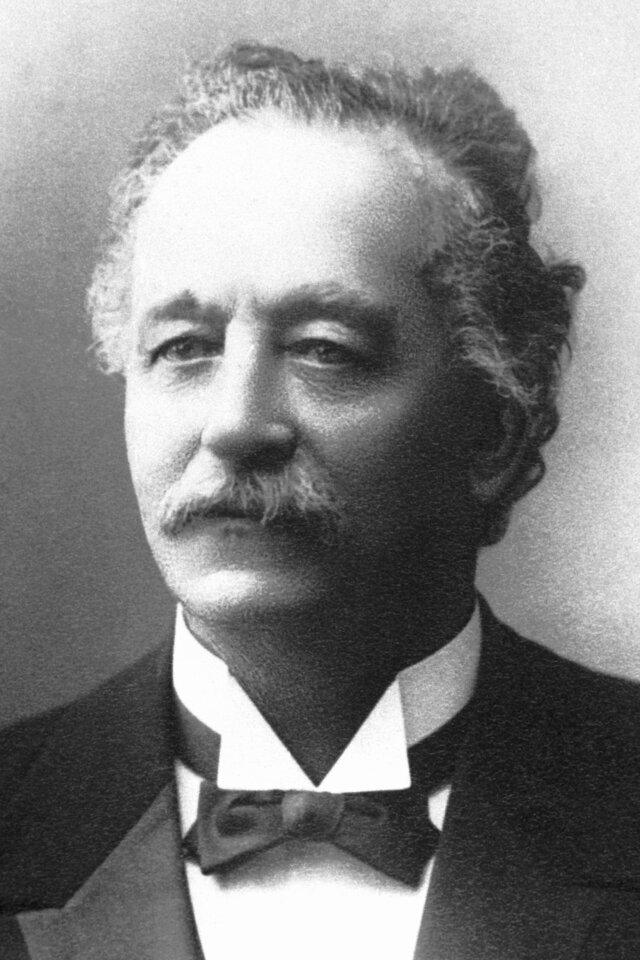
- Born: 19 February 1833; Geneva, Switzerland
- Died: 7 December 1906 (aged 73); Bern, Switzerland
- Relatives: Martin Brauen (great-grandson)
- Awards: Nobel Peace Prize, 1902

Élie Ducommun (19 February 1833, Geneva – 7 December 1906, Bern) was a Swiss peace activist. He was a Nobel laureate, awarded the 1902 Nobel Peace Prize, which he shared with Charles Albert Gobat.

Born in Geneva, he worked as a tutor, language teacher, journalist and a translator for the Swiss federal Chancellery (1869–1873).

In 1867 he helped to found the Ligue de la paix et de la liberté (League of Peace and Freedom), though he continued working at other positions, including secretary for the Jura-Simplon Steel Company from 1873 to 1891. That year, he was appointed director of the newly formed International Peace Bureau, the first non-governmental international peace organization, based in Bern. He refused to accept a salary for the position, stating that he wished to serve in this capacity solely for reasons of idealism. From 1895 he was made the director of Correspondance bi-mensuelle, journal of the International Peace Office.

His keen organizational skills ensured the group's success. He was awarded in the Nobel Peace Prize in 1902, and served as director of the organization until his death in 1906.

== See also ==
- List of peace activists
