= Édouard Descamps =

Belgian jurist and politician

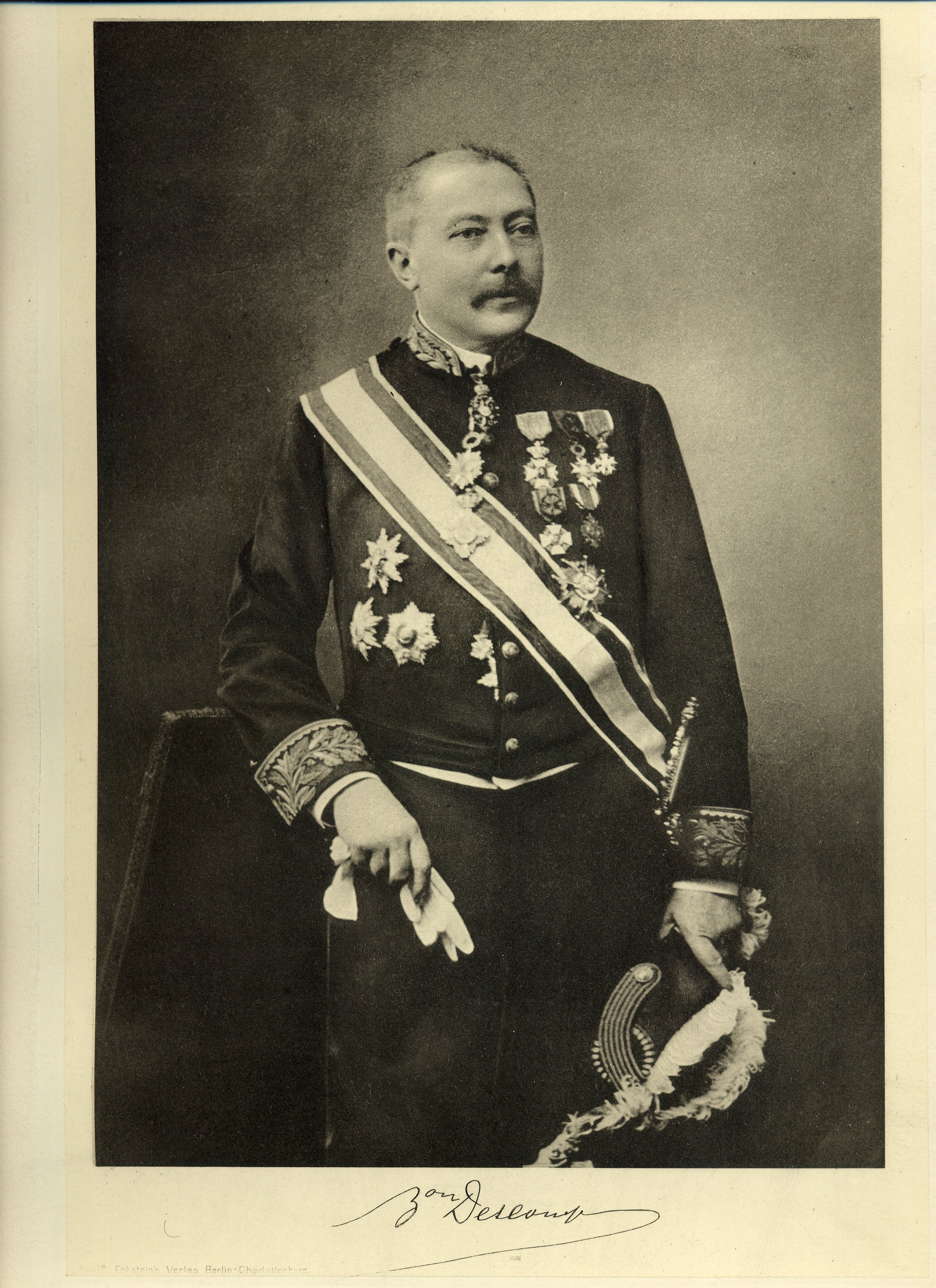
Baron Descamps (1900)

Baron Édouard Eugène François Descamps (1847–1933) was a Belgian jurist and politician who was known as a contributor to international law.

== Family ==
He was the son of Edouard-J. Descamps and Sylvie Van der Elst. He was married to Maria David-Fischbach Malacord (1860–1921), who gave him three sons (of whom one died):

- Pierre Descamps (1884–1965)
- Emmanuel Descamps (1886–1968)

== Career ==
He was a law professor at the University of Louvain, and it was at his suggestion that a committee of the League of Nations proposed an international court of justice.

Between 1901–1907 and 1911–1914, he was president of the Senate, and he served until 1910 as Minister of sciences and arts.

== Honours ==
- Belgium: Minister of State, by Royal Decree.
- Belgium: Created Baron Descamps, by Royal Decree in 1904.
- Belgium: Grand Cordon of the Order of Leopold.
- Belgium: Knight Grand Cross in the Order of the Crown, RD in 1919.
- France: Knight Grand Officer of the Legion of Honour.
- Italy: Knight Grand Cross in the Order of the Crown of Italy.
- Netherlands: Knight Grand Cross in the Order of the Netherlands Lion.
- Japan: Knight Grand Cross in the Order of the Rising Sun.
- Greece: Knight Grand Cross in the Order of the Phoenix.
- Luxembourg: Knight Grand Cross in the Order of the Oak Crown.
