= Herman Didrich Janson =

Herman Didrich Janson (8 July 1757 – 13 March 1822) was a Norwegian shipper, businessman and powerful figure, and owner of Damsgård hovedgård, which he bought at auction in 1796. The gardens were often known as the Janson-gården and as the Jansonmarken. The property was in the family's ownership until 1983.

Herman Didrich Janson was also the owner of Stiftsgården from 1805, an estate which he sold in 1809 to his stepson, County Governor Edvard Hagerup.
