= Carl Ludwig von Bar =

German jurist (1836–1913)

Carl Ludwig von Bar (born Hanover, 1836; died 21 August 1913) was a German jurist.

== Biography ==
He was trained in the universities of Göttingen and Berlin and was a member of the Reichstag during the years 1890-93. He was a strong advocate of publicity as well as of more humane procedure in all criminal trials. Sometime professor at Göttingen and a member of the Hague Tribunal, Bar acquired a worldwide reputation as a high authority on international law and a leading advocate of international arbitration.

== Works ==
- Das Internationale Privat und Strafrecht (International civil and criminal law, 1862)
- Die Redefreiheit der Milglieder gezetzgebender Verssammlungen (Freedom of speech of lawmakers, 1868)
- Die Lehre vom Kausalzusammenhange im Rechte (The doctrine of causality in law, 1871)
- Das deutsche Reichsgericht (The court of the German Empire, 1875)
- Staat und Katholische Kirche in Preussen (The state and the Catholic Church in Prussia, 1883)
