= Henri Morel (Swiss politician) =

Swiss politician

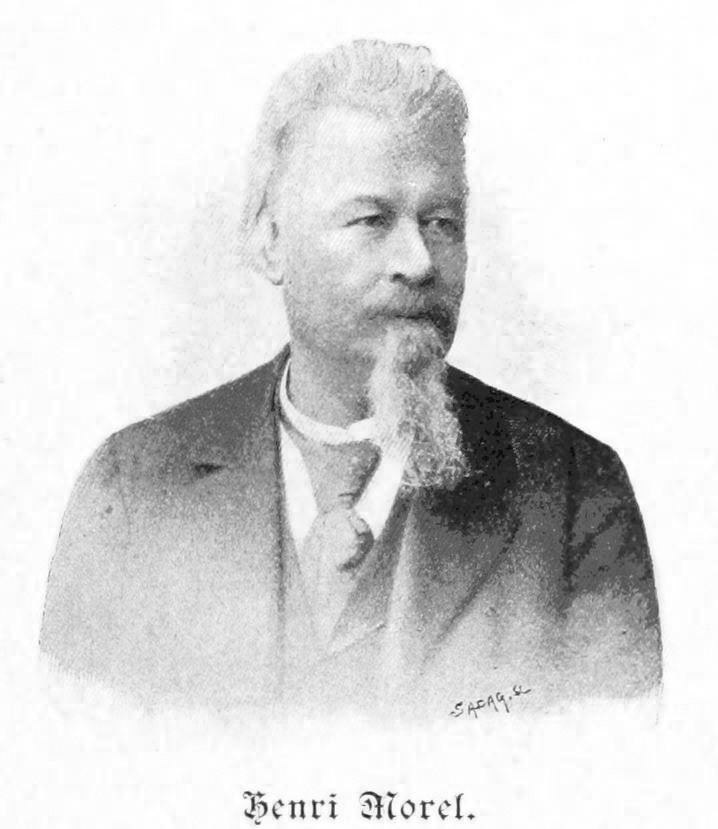
Henri Morel.

Henri Morel (13 June 1838 in Claye – 18 May 1912) was a Swiss politician and President of the Swiss National Council (1886/1887).

Preceded by Andrea Bezzola	President of the National Council; 1886/1887	Succeeded by Josef Zemp
