= Ferenc Kemény (sports manager) =

Hungarian sports manager

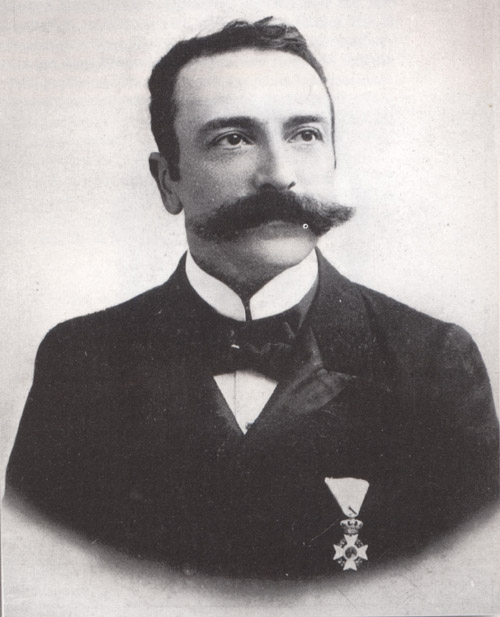
- Ferenc Kemény in 1896
- Born: Ferenc Kohn; 17 July 1860; Nagybecskerek, Hungary
- Died: 21 November 1944 (aged 84); Budapest, Hungary
- Resting place: New Public Cemetery
- Citizenship: Hungarian
- Occupations: Sports manager; Teacher; Writer; Peace activist
- Known for: Founding member of the International Olympic Committee

Secretary General of the Hungarian Olympic Committee
- In office 1895–1907

Ferenc Kemény (17 July 1860 – 21 November 1944) was a Hungarian sports manager, educational writer, humanist peace activist, and a founding member of the International Olympic Committee (IOC), which initiated and launched the modern Olympic Games, and the founding secretary of the Hungarian Olympic Committee. He was also a broad-minded teacher, sports diplomat, and some consider him among the greatest figures in the 19th-century Hungarian civil peace movement.

He was also nominated for the Nobel Prize in Literature in 1901 and 1902.

== Early life and education ==
Ferenc Kemény was born on 17 July 1860 in Nagybecskerek, Austria-Hungary, (currently known as Zrenjanin in Serbia), as the son of a Jewish leather merchant. His birth name was Ferenc Kohn, but he changed it when he converted to Christianity during his university years.

After his secondary school years at a boarding school in Stuttgart, Kemény continued his studies at the University of Budapest, where he obtained a teaching degree in mathematics and physics in 1883, and a teaching degree in German-French language and literature in 1888. In the meantime, in 1884–85, he furthered his education in Paris by attending law lectures at the Collège de France and the Sorbonne University, and made a study trip to Western Europe.

== Academic career ==
In the early 1890s, Kemény was a secondary school teacher at the military secondary school in Kőszeg, worked in Brassó, and was then the director of the state secondary school in Eger. From 1894 onwards, he taught at the state secondary school in the 6th district of Budapest, and then become a titular school district director, during which time he published numerous pedagogical articles in Hungarian, German, and French.

== Sports managerial career ==
=== Meeting Baron de Coubertin ===
During his stay in the French capital in 1884–85, Kemény had the opportunity to meet Pierre de Coubertin, who was three years his junior, and they became friends as both were attracted to physical education, and likewise, they fought and cycled together, and also exchanged ideas about pedagogy.

In addition to the educational effect of sporting activity, Kemény had also hypothesized the possibility of using sport in favor of the pacifist movement, an ideal at the center of his occupations, so during his stay in the French capital, he supported de Coubertin's proposal to restore the ancient Olympic Games, and during one of their walks, Kemény suggested that the first modern Olympics should be held at the classical site, on Greek soil.

Kemény maintained contact with Coubertin, who asked him for his opinion on Olympic matters several times, and on 15 January 1894, he received a letter from Coubertin, asking him to help organize the Olympic movement.

=== Olympic movement ===
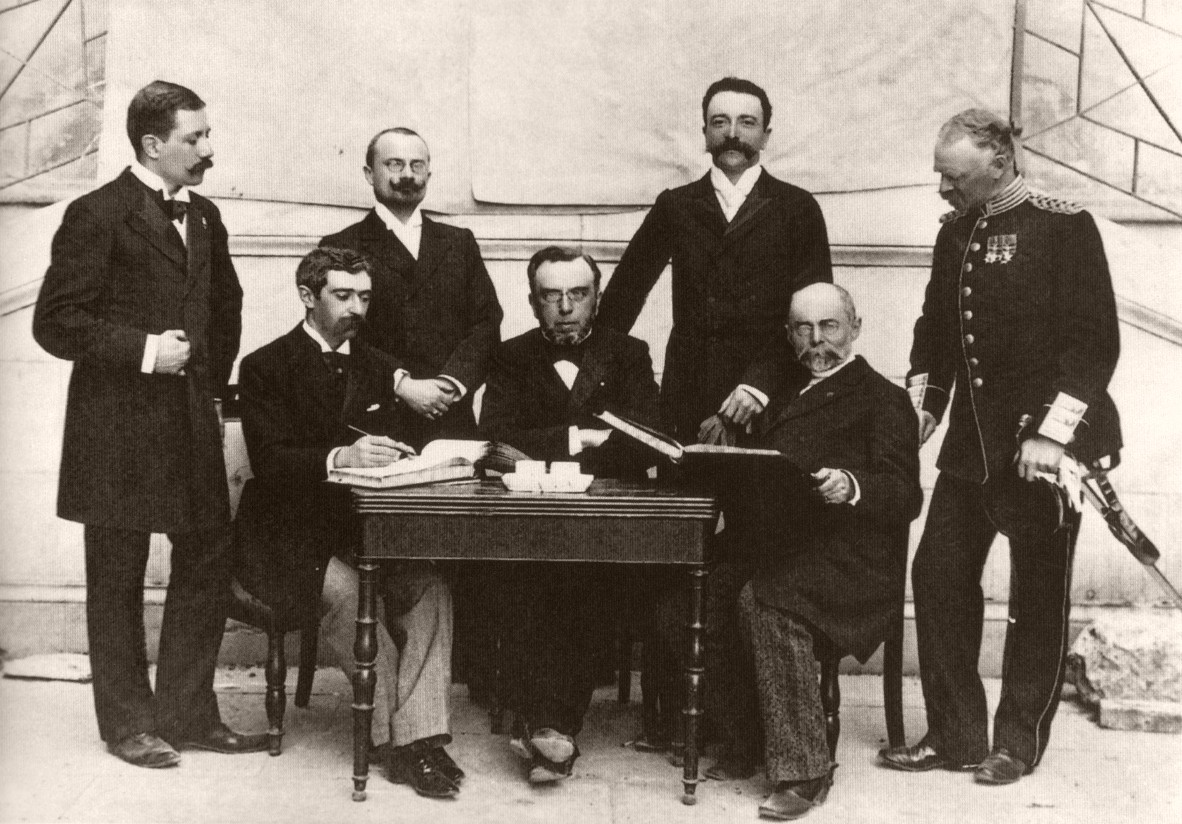
Kemény (standing, second from right) with the members of the Olympic Committee at the Athens Olympic Games in 1896.

On 12 April 1894, Coubertin offered Kemény the position of honorary vice-president in the upcoming International Olympic Committee (IOC), but the Hungarian ministry only supported him morally, not financially, and therefore he was unable to travel to Paris to attend the inaugural Olympic Congress of 23 June of that year. Despite being absent, Coubertin still appointed him as one of the founding members of the IOC, thus being the only Hungarian member in the founding meeting of the IOC.

A friend of Coubertin, Kemény was one of his colleagues who worked with him to bring the modern Olympic Games to life, whose inaugural edition was held in Athens in 1896. For a long time, however, it was doubtful whether Greece, struggling with economic difficulties, would be able to organize the games, so in November 1894, Kemény, who was already teaching in Budapest at the time, suggested the idea of "moving" the Olympics to Hungary, which was celebrating its millennium, and Budapest was thus considered as a possible host city for the 1896 edition. He thus approached Hungary's Minister of Culture, Loránd Eötvös, who did not support the cause because he considered it too risky and a costly undertaking. It was later revealed that Coubertin only offered this opportunity to encourage the reluctant Greeks to begin the Olympic preparations, and indeed, the idea of organizing the Games in Hungary played a role in the development of a national movement among the Greeks in early 1895, and the Olympics were eventually held in Athens.

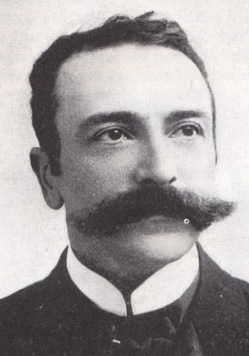
Kemény around 1896.

In late 1895, Kemény co-founded the forerunner of the Hungarian Olympic Committee (MOB), which held its inaugural meeting on 19 December 1895, in the boardroom of the National Gymnastics Association's gymnasium on Szentkirályi Street in Budapest, where Albert Berzeviczy was elected president of the board and Kemény was elected general-secretary. The MOB is the third oldest social (civil) organization in Hungary still operating today, as well as the sixth national committee to be established in the world, after the French, Greek, American, German and Australian committees. Kemény then led the Hungarian delegation at the first Olympic Games in 1896, and was a member of the five-member committee that decided on controversial issues that arose during the games. His international recognition is indicated by the fact that the statue of George Averoff, the Greek financier who financed the reconstruction of the Olympic stadium, was inaugurated with his speech in French on the day before the opening ceremony. At the Games, Hungary won its first two gold medals, plus one silver and three bronze medals, thus becoming the sixth most successful delegation at the time.

=== Later career ===
The success of the Athens Games further deepened the differences between the two largest sports associations in Hungary, the Hungarian Athletics Club (MAC) and the National Gymnastics Association, and as a member of the latter, Kemény was involuntarily involved in the struggle for the leadership of Hungarian sports, from which the MAC leaders emerged victorious. After the MAC leaders became dominant in the leadership of the MOB, Kemény was increasingly ignored and eventually became a target of frequent personal attacks and anti-Semitic remarks from other MOB members who felt he did not have the adequate social status to represent Hungary on the IOC, so he decided to present a dual resignation from both entities in May 1907, which also marked the end of his sports life.

Ahead of the 1908 Olympic Games in London, the Hungarian government sent a new IOC member to replace the retiring Kemény, which threatened IOC's principle of independence. He attended the London Olympics, but only as a private person, and was not even invited to the 1911 IOC Congress in Budapest.

== Writing career ==
Kemény was nominated for the Nobel Prize in Literature in 1901 and 1902. His works, "One Way to Solve the Peace Problem: the World Academy", written in 1906, and "The Philosophy of War", were both nominated for the Nobel Prize. His social science studies were published by Atheneum.

== Peace activist career ==
Is it possible to love our homeland without hating our neighbors?.

— Kemény at the World Peace Congress of 1896 in Budapest.

Kemény initiated several peace conferences and peace organizations, becoming the driving force and determinant of the domestic and international peace movement and peace education. Together with Mór Jókai, he founded the Hungarian Peace Society, of which he became secretary. He was entrusted with the organization of the World Peace Congress of 1896 in Budapest.

Due to his commitment to peace, Kemény nominated Franz Joseph I of Austria for the Nobel Peace Prize in 1908, 1913, and 1914; for instance, when he addressed the Nobel Committee in Oslo on 25 January 1914, he stated that "after careful consideration, I would like to propose to the honored committee once again the Emperor of Austria and King of Hungary: Franz Joseph I, as a candidate for this year's Nobel Prize". Just a few months after this nominated for the Nobel Peace Prize, however, Franz Joseph was the first to sign a declaration of War during the July Crisis.

== Later life and death ==
After leaving the sports world in 1907, Kemény devoted the rest of his life exclusively to educational studies, particularly pedagogy, being a member of the Hungarian Pedagogical Society since 1903, and an editor of the Ungarische Pädagogische Revue until his retirement in 1920. In 1934, he was co-editor of "The Encyclopedia of Pedagogy".

When Nazi Germany occupied Hungary at the outbreak of the Second World War, Kemény and his wife Jolán Schäffer had long been converted to Christianity, but when the Nazi surrogate Hungarian Arrow Cross Party took power, it became clear that despite their conversion, the Keménys would have to go to the ghetto in December 1944, so they escaped the threat of deportation by ending their lives, doing so in Budapest on 21 November 1944, at the age of 84.

== Legacy ==
When the IOC was founded in 1894, Kemény was headmaster of a school in Eger, so when a new sports stadium was inaugurated in that city on 1 June 1980, it was named after him. At least two statues were erected in his honor, one in Eger, and the other in the Olympic grove of the University of Physical Education in Budapest, which was unveiled in 1988. Eger now has a school, a statue, and a memorial plaque commemorating his memory. Furthermore, a marble block in the Panathenaic Stadium, the site of the first modern Olympics, preserves the name of Ferenc Kemény.

Due to his reputation as Hungary's most prominent Jewish sports pioneer, Kemény was elected into the International Jewish Sports Hall of Fame.

In September 2024, the Hungarian Jewish Cultural Association and the Hungarian Olympic Committee organized a commemoration at the stumbling block of Ferenc Kemény, in the 13th district of Budapest. The event was attended by, among others, László Fábián, the then secretary general of the MOB, and Alida Dóra Gazsó, Olympic silver medalist, world and European champion Hungarian kayaker.
