= Lists of atheists =

Atheism, in the broadest sense, is an absence of belief in the existence of deities. In a narrower sense, atheism is simply the absence of belief that any deities exist. This is a compilation of the various lists of atheists with articles on Wikipedia by category. Living people in these lists are those whose atheism is relevant to their notable activities or public life, and who have publicly identified themselves as atheists.

== Lists by country, territory, or people ==
- List of atheist Americans
- List of atheist Armenians
- List of Dutch atheists
- List of Jewish atheists and agnostics
- List of South African atheists

== Lists by profession ==
- List of atheist activists and educators
- List of atheist authors
- List of atheist philosophers
- List of atheists in film, radio, television and theater
- List of atheists in music
- List of atheists in politics and law
- List of atheists in science and technology
- List of atheists (miscellaneous)

== Lists by surname ==
- List of atheists (surnames A to B)
- List of atheists (surnames C to D)
- List of atheists (surnames E to G)
- List of atheists (surnames H to K)
- List of atheists (surnames L to M)
- List of atheists (surnames N to Q)
- List of atheists (surnames R to S)
- List of atheists (surnames T to Z)

== See also ==
- Category:Atheists
- List of nonreligious Nobel laureates
- List of fictitious atheists and agnostics
- Lists of people by belief (including non-beliefs)
  - List of agnostics
  - List of converts to nontheism
  - List of deists
  - List of former atheists and agnostics
  - List of humanists
  - List of Jewish atheists and agnostics
  - List of pantheists
- List of secularist organizations
- Lists about skepticism
