= List of Dutch atheists =

This is an alphabetical list of Dutch people who have been identified as atheists. The people on this list have either declared themselves as or confirmed themselves to be atheist; and/or have been identified as atheists by a reliable source; and/or whose most recently recorded attitude toward the existence of God or gods is of disbelief.

While definitions of atheism vary, a typical atheist is someone who has made a conscious decision that they do not believe in the existence of any form of deity. It is a widespread misconception, however, that all atheists deny the existence of a god or gods. While a minority of them certainly do, most atheists would strongly disagree with this definition: they don't entirely reject the concept "God", but would rather argue that the term God has no importance, and possibly no meaning to them. The distinction is made between lack of belief in god(s) or weak atheism and denial of the existence of god(s) or strong atheism. Weak atheism should not be confused with agnosticism. An agnostic is in this case an individual who claims to have no opinion about God.

The Netherlands is a secular Western European country that has witnessed a strong decline in its religious establishment. Membership and religious attendance have dropped dramatically since the late fifties. Worst hit are the mainstream Protestant churches, whose membership declined from 23 per cent in the late fifties to six per cent in 2007. According to government estimations this percentage could drop as low as two per cent by 2020. The Catholic church will likely face another decade of decline before levelling off around 2020. The Roman Catholic population dropped from 42 per cent in 1958 to 17 in 2007 and now facing a fall to as low as 10 per cent. In spite of these figures, the Dutch Central Bureau of Statistics (CBS) finds the number of self-described Christians has stopped declining since the nineties. As of 2005, a small majority of the Dutch population (52 per cent), still called itself Christian. These figures are disputed by another government research body, the Social and Cultural Planning Office (SCP), which has maintained a 40 per cent figure since the early nineties. While 48.4 percent are irreligious, the actual percentage of atheists in the Netherlands may be 14, 39, 42 or 44, making it the 14th-most atheistic country in the world.

== List ==
- Hulya Aydogan (1974–)Dutch-Turkish writer and journalist. Convinced atheist and advocate of religious criticism
- Hassan Bahara (1978–) Moroccan-Dutch writer.
- Floris van den Berg (1973–) philosopher, author.
- Hafid Bouazza (1970–2021) Moroccan-Dutch writer.
- Paul Cliteur (1955–) jurist and philosopher, as well as a columnist, publisher and writer. He's currently professor of "encyclopædia of law" at the University of Leiden.
- Anton Levien Constandse (1899–1985) scientist, writer, journalist, publisher, freethinker and anarchist.
- Aaf Brandt Corstius (1975–) columnist, writer and translator.
- Eduard Douwes Dekker (Multatuli) (1820–1887) very influential 19th-century writer and freemason.
- Arjan Ederveen (1956–) TV actor and comedian, best known for Theo en Thea and 30 minuten.
- Elsbeth Etty (1951–) journalist, writer and professor of Dutch Language and Literature at the University of Amsterdam.
- Javier Guzman (1977–) stand-up comedian.
- Stine Jensen (1972–) Danish-Dutch journalist, writer and philosopher. She's a professor of literature studies at the VU University Amsterdam.
- Lousewies van der Laan (1966–) politician.
- Rob Muntz (1963–) comedian, columnist and presenter. In 2005 he co-produced (together with Paul Jan van de Wint) the controversial television series called God doesn't exist, in which he interviews prominent Dutch atheists.
- Ronald Plasterk (1957–) columnist, politician and biologist. He is the former minister of the Interior and Kingdom Relations for the PvdA party. During his scientific career he was a professor of molecular biology at VU University Amsterdam and developmental biology at Utrecht University.
- Dick Swaab physician and neurobiologist, known for his brain research.
- Hans Teeuwen (1967–) comedian and singer.
- Paul Jan van de Wint (1962–) presenter.

== See also ==
- List of atheists
