= List of atheists (surnames A to B) =

Atheists with surnames starting A and B, sortable by the field for which they are mainly known and nationality.

Name	Dates	Known for	Reference
Jason Aaron	1973–	American comics writer, known for his work on The Other Side, Scalped, Ghost Rider, Wolverine and PunisherMAX.	"I’ve been an atheist for many years, but I’ve remained fascinated by religion. If anything, I’ve become more fascinated by religion and faith after I lost mine."
David Aaronovitch	1954–	British journalist, author and broadcaster.	"Like most of the Godless (or Godfree), I have no desire to proselytise for atheism or to persuade people out of religions that may offer them comfort and companionship."
Abu Abraham	1924–2002	Indian political cartoonist, journalist, and author.	"His strongest theme, as India sank faster into factional and religious politics, had remained adherence to the original vision of Mahatma Gandhi and Nehru for a wholly secular state: Abu was a rationalist and atheist."
Pietro Acciarito	1871–1943	Italian anarchist activist who attempted to assassinate King Umberto I.	"He was tried at the Rome Assizes on 28 and 29 May, and on being convicted, was sentenced to imprisonment for life. He was certainly both an Anarchist and an atheist, but whether he had accomplices or acted solely on his own initiative is doubtful."
Zackie Achmat	1962–	South African anti-HIV/AIDS activist, founder of the Treatment Action Campaign.	"I am a married gay man and an atheist who subscribes to one moral viewpoint on sexuality and HIV – protect yourself and protect those you love – do not harm yourself and do not harm others."
Clark Adams	1969–2007	American freethought leader and atheist activist.	"In college, after reading material from American Atheists, he became, in his words, 'a pretty hard core atheist.'"
Douglas Adams	1952–2001	British radio and television writer and novelist, author of The Hitchhiker's Guide to the Galaxy.	"I am a radical Atheist..." - Adams in an interview with American Atheists.
Mary Adams	1898–1984	British television producer and administrator in the BBC, instrumental in setting up the BBC's television service.	"She was a socialist, a romantic communist, and could charm with her charisma, spontaneity, and quick informed intelligence. She was a fervent atheist and advocate of humanism and common sense, accepting her stance without subjecting it to analysis."
Phillip Adams	1939–	Australian journalist and broadcaster, writer, film-maker, left-wing radical thinker and iconoclast. He was the Australian Humanist of the Year in 1987.	"I’d been an atheist since I was five."
Adithya	1974–	Indian actor in Tamil and Malayalam films.	"Am I glad I am an atheist for I am convinced that were I to be a believer in the cosmic watchdog then I would surely be reserved a suite in hotel hell. The good part is that I will not be alone. All my close circle of friends will be there to keep me company, males and females alike. Hell, come to think of it the best of everybody will be around – It's going to be one big party.
Larry Adler	1914–2001	American musician, widely acknowledged as one of the world's most skilled harmonica players.	"I was among friends and family who packed a chapel at Golders Green crematorium on Friday to hear more than two hours of tributes to Larry Adler. In accordance with Larry's wishes - he was an inveterate atheist who refused to recognise the supernatural in any shape or form - there were no religious observances."
Joe Ahearne	1963–	British television writer and director, best known for his work on several 'cult' fantasy-based programmes including Ultraviolet and Doctor Who.	Interviewer: "Has researching subjects such as exorcism and possession forced you to challenge your belief system?" Ahearne: "No I'm a devout atheist and endlessly fascinated with the issue of faith in the impossible."
Guy Aldred	1886–1963	British (English) anarchist communist and a prominent member of the Anti-Parliamentary Communist Federation.	"The defendant, in the witness-box, declared that the meeting was quite orderly, and there were cries of "Shame" when he was arrested. He denied the charges. Aldred said he was an Atheist and a Socialist."
Ayaan Hirsi Ali	1969–	Dutch feminist and politician, a prominent critic of Islam, whose screenplay for the movie Submission led to death threats.	"Too much reason can reform a faith away, which would be fine with Hirsi Ali, who regards herself as an atheist."
Subhashini Ali	19??–	Indian Marxist politician and President of the All India Democratic Women's Association.	"There are religions that have very rigid rules and there are others that don't. Religion is something that I, as a person, am not interested in. I have always been an atheist. My parents were atheists. It doesn't bother me if somebody is religious. My problem is when religion is used to institutionalise other things."
Tariq Ali	1943–	British-Pakistani historian, novelist, filmmaker, political campaigner and commentator.	"It is well known that I am not a religious person, I grew up and remain an atheist..."
Amy Alkon	1964–	American advice columnist known as the Advice Goddess, author of Ask the Advice Goddess, published in more than 100 newspapers within North America.	"Come on, somebody tell me I can't possibly have morals because I'm an atheist."
Dave Allen	1936–2005	Irish comedian, popular on United Kingdom and Australian television in the 1960s, 1970s and also in the 1990s.	"Allen had little time for those who unquestioningly accept the tenets of any creed or system of thought. He applied this stricture equally to himself, and used humour to undermine even his own scepticism ("I'm an atheist, thank God"). [...] "His baffled humanity," wrote Charles Spencer, the theatre critic of The Daily Telegraph, in 1993, "his perplexity in the face of life's mysteries and irritations, are the qualities that make him such a fine and sometimes moving comedian. He's a blaspheming atheist on the side of the angels."
Keith Allen	1953–	British comedian, actor, singer and writer, father of Lily Allen.	"One of the many reasons Allen made the documentary was to explore his own atheism. Unlike most non-believers, he claims, in all seriousness, to have once seen God. It was at Glastonbury during the 1980s, and (as is the case with most of the splendid anecdotes that litter his conversation), it involved enough mind-altering substances to stun a baby elephant. [...] Like any considered atheist, particularly one who will burn in Hell, he lives according to a moral code that refuses to romanticise things like love, or devotion."
Woody Allen	1935–	American film director, writer, actor, comedian, playwright and jazz musician, winner of numerous awards.	"To you, I'm an atheist; to God, I'm the Loyal Opposition."
Salvador Allende	1908–1973	Chilean Marxist politician, President of Chile from November 1970 until his death during the coup d'état of 11 September 1973.	"The inauguration was, however, followed by an ecumenical service in the cathedral, since, as the new President, an atheist and Freemason, has already explained, many of those who voted for his "Popular Unity" programme are sincere Roman Catholics."
Luisa Isabel Alvarez de Toledo	1936–2008	Spanish duchess, holder of the ducal title Medina-Sidonia, known as the "Red Duchess".	"The dictator Francisco Franco jailed her for championing workers, who nicknamed her the "Red Duchess". She challenged Spain's official history, arguing that Columbus didn't discover America. She was an atheist, a republican and reckoned her 13th-century ancestor Guzman el Bueno, ennobled for fighting the Moors, was a north African whose grandmother was black."
Robert Altman	1925–2006	American film director, recognised in 2006 with an Academy Honorary Award.	"Still, it's worth noting that by the age of 20 this whistle-blower had resisted two of the most powerful institutions - church and army, both. He is an atheist, "And I have been against all of these wars ever since.""
Jorge Amado	1912–2001	Brazilian author.	Amado is described as an "ateu convicto", or "convinced atheist".
Eric Ambler	1909–1998	British (English) writer of spy novels, influential for introducing a new realism to the genre. Awards: OBE.	"Once, filming in Italy with the American director John Huston and a US army crew, Ambler and his colleagues were shelled so fiercely that his unconscious 'played a nasty trick on him' (Ambler, Here Lies, 208). A confirmed atheist, he heard himself saying, 'Into thy hands I commend my spirit.' "
Sir Kingsley Amis	1922–1995	British (English) novelist, poet, critic and teacher, most famous for his novels Lucky Jim and the Booker Prize-winning The Old Devils.	"His son Martin, who led the ceremony, said: "His relationship with the Christian God was not entirely frictionless. In 1962, (the Russian poet) Yevtushenko asked him 'Are you an atheist?'. He replied: 'Well, yes - but it's more that I hate Him'.""
Baba Amte	1914–2008	Indian social activist, known for his work with lepers.	"From 1990, he went to live by the Narmada, the most threatened river, building another ashram from scratch on stony, empty ground. Each day, until he grew too frail and the slippery banks too hazardous, he would walk to the river to watch it flow. Atheist though he was, he saw the Narmada as a goddess whose beauty should be decorated only with micro-dams on a human scale. And certainly he did not want his ashes to float there after his death. He insisted on burial, where his body—becoming what he had once been most disgusted and afraid of—might go on being useful and productive, inside the earth."
John Anderson	1893–1962	Australian philosopher, founder of the empirical philosophy known as 'Sydney realism'.	"This degree of radicalism Sydney could endure. But what of a man who had signed up as a communist immediately on his arrival, who was unashamedly an atheist, a realist where philosophers were expected to be idealists, who freely mixed with students when he was expected to meet them only in classes or, very occasionally, in their studies? Trouble was bound to loom ahead."
William Crawford Anderson	1877–1919	British (Scottish) socialist politician, a founder member of the Union of Democratic Control.	"His mother was an intelligent and widely read woman of strong, radical, Presbyterian views who encouraged William to read extensively and passed on a love of literature which stayed with him long after he was converted to free-thinking atheism."
Seth Andrews	1968–	Former American fundamentalist Christian and Christian radio host. Now a podcaster, author and speaker on the subject of atheism.	"I’m not an enemy of religious people, but I’ll be honest and say I am an enemy of religion."
Natalie Angier	1958–	American nonfiction writer and science journalist for The New York Times; 1991 winner of the Pulitzer Prize for Beat Reporting.	"I may be an atheist, and I may be impressed that, through the stepwise rigor of science, its Spockian eyebrow of doubt always cocked, we have learned so much about the universe. "I’m an Atheist. I don’t believe in God, Gods, Godlets or any sort of higher power beyond the universe itself, which seems quite high and powerful enough to me."
Aziz Ansari	1983–	American Comedian.	Ansari has described himself as an atheist.
Carmen Argibay	1939–2014	Argentinian lawyer, a member of the Argentine Supreme Court of Justice, the first woman to be nominated for the Court by a democratic government in Argentina.	In interviews has described himself as "a militant atheist." Has said that "if one reads my declarations correctly. I believe that saying up front who one is or what one thinks is an indication of honesty, which is the first step towards impartiality. My beliefs, or lack thereof, should not interfere in the judicial decisions I take."
Isaac Asimov	1920–1992	Russian-born American author and professor of biochemistry, a highly prolific and successful writer of science fiction and popular science books. Widely considered a master of the science-fiction genre, he was considered one of the "Big Three" science-fiction writers during his lifetime.	"I am an atheist, out and out. It took me a long time to say it... I don't have the evidence to prove that God doesn't exist, but I so strongly suspect he doesn't that I don't want to waste my time."
Diana Athill	1917–2019	British literary editor, novelist and memoirist who worked with some of the most important writers of the 20th century.	"I have been an atheist almost since the day I was confirmed in the Christian faith by the Bishop of Norwich in 1931."
Peter Atkins	1940–	British (English) chemist, Professor of chemistry at Lincoln College, Oxford in England.	When asked by Rod Liddle in the documentary The Trouble with Atheism "Give me your views on the existence, or otherwise, of God", Peter Atkins replied "Well it's fairly straightforward: there isn't one. And there's no evidence for one, no reason to believe that there is one, and so I don't believe that there is one. And I think that it is rather foolish that people do think that there is one."
Scott Atran	1952–	American anthropologist.	"I find it fascinating that among the brilliant scientists and philosophers at the conference, there was no convincing evidence presented that they know how to deal with the basic irrationality of human life and society other than to insist against all reason and evidence that things ought to be rational and evidence based. It makes me embarrassed to be a scientist and atheist."
Vincent Auriol	1884–1966	French politician who served as the first President of the Fourth Republic from 1947 to 1954.	"When John XXIII was later "elevated" to the College of Cardinals, he insisted upon receiving the red hat from the atheist and notoriously anti-clerical socialist Vincent Auriol, President of the country of France, whom he had described as "an honest socialist."
Bob Avakian	1943–	American author of Away With All Gods! (2008) and Chairman of the Revolutionary Communist Party, USA.	Part Four of Away With All Gods! contains a section called "God Does Not Exist – And There Is No Good Reason to Believe in God".
Hector Avalos	1958–2021	Mexican-American professor of Religious Studies at Iowa State University and author of several books about religion.	"I was a child evangelist and preacher, and I used to go around a lot of churches in Arizona specifically [...] it was coming along sort of in stages [...] slowly through high school, and so by the first year of college, I pretty much had realised that I am an atheist."
Edward Aveling	1849–1898	British (English) Marxist activist and partner of Karl Marx's daughter Eleanor.	"His failed marriage aside, he was on a climbing path of conventional success and acclaim, which he left in 1879 when he abandoned his application for the chair of comparative anatomy because the post required its holder to profess Christianity. In July 1879 he made a public pronouncement that he had been an atheist for two or three years. In June 1881 he lost his lectureship, largely because of his atheism."
Uri Avnery	1923–2018	German-born Israeli journalist, left-wing peace activist, and former Knesset member.	"Well, I myself am a 100% atheist. And I am increasingly worried that the Israeli-Palestinian struggle, which dominates our entire life, is assuming a more and more religious character."
Julius Axelrod	1912–2004	American Nobel Prize winning biochemist, noted for his work on the release and reuptake of catecholamine neurotransmitters and major contributions to the understanding of the pineal gland and how it is regulated during the sleep-wake cycle.	"Although he became an atheist early in life and resented the strict upbringing of his parents' religion, he identified with Jewish culture and joined several international fights against anti-Semitism."
Sir A. J. Ayer	1910–1989	British philosopher and advocate of logical positivism, Grote Professor of the Philosophy of Mind and Logic at University College London, Wykeham Professor of Logic at the University of Oxford, and a president of the Aristotelian Society.	"Conversely, an absolute denial of God's existence is equally meaningless, since verification is impossible. However, despite this assertion, Ayer may be considered a practical atheist: one who sees no reason to worship an invisible deity." "I was thoroughly irritated when Freddie Ayer, the philosopher who was at Christ Church with me, presented me with a book inscribed: 'To my fellow atheist'."
Franko B	1960–	Italian-born, London-based performance artist who uses his own body in his art.	"But while the power of Franko B's medium is unquestionable, the multi-dimensional interpretations open to onlookers mean that he is prey to negative readings. He protests: "Blood is one of the fluids inside me that gives me life, and in a way when I'm performing I feel I'm giving life. I grew up Catholic, and while I am an atheist, religion is a major influence on my work - I love churches, I love paintings of the Crucifixion. Whatever I do, I believe in it 100 per cent.""
Michelle Bachelet	1951–	Chilean politician, former President of Chile and the first woman to hold this position in the country's history.	"A paediatrician turned politician, Ms Bachelet is an atheist single mother with three children by two different partners - which makes her an odd choice in a macho and profoundly Catholic country." "Given this context, it is nothing short of extraordinary - even revolutionary - that the clear front-runner in the presidential vote being held on Sunday is Michelle Bachelet, a divorced mother of three who is an atheist and a member of the Socialist Party."
Francis Bacon	1909–1992	Irish-born figurative painter whose work is known for its bold, austere, and often grotesque or nightmarish imagery.	"And a painter works with his human material, not with colours and paintbrushes. It's his thoughts that enter the painting. But I don't expect any certainty in life, I don't believe in anything, not in God, not in morality, not in social success ... I just believe in the present moment if it has genius - in the spinning roulette ball or in the emotions that I experience when what I transmit on to the canvas works. I am completely amoral and atheist, and if I hadn't painted, I would have been a thief or a criminal. My paintings are a lot less violent than me. Perhaps if my childhood had been happier, I would have painted bouquets of flowers."
Kevin Bacon	1958–	American film and theatre actor whose notable roles include Animal House, A Few Good Men, Stir of Echoes, JFK, Apollo 13, Mystic River and Footloose.	"I don't believe in God, but if I did I would say that sex is a Godgiven right. Otherwise it's the end of our species."
Julian Baggini	1968–	British (English) writer specializing in philosophy, author of Atheism: A Very Short Introduction.	"The reverend Dr Tom Ambrose was sacked yesterday by his bishop for being "arrogant, aggressive, rude, bullying, high-handed, disorganised and at times petty", as a Church of England tribunal put it. Twice, he even spat at parishioners. You might expect that, as an atheist, I might rub my hands over this clerical outrage."
Hassan Bahara	1978–	Moroccan-Dutch author.	"In interviews he calls himself an atheist, but "so far I have been left alone by the beardmonkeys [referring to Muslims]. Perhaps I have to make myself heard just a little bit better, I should be more explicit in my aversion to Islam and religion in general.""
Roy Bailey	1935–2018	British (English) socialist folk singer, awarded an MBE for services to folk music in 2000.	"I think of myself as a militant atheist and I never knew quite where Tony [Benn] was coming from on the religion side."
Sir Edward Battersby Bailey	1881–1968	British geologist, director of the British Geological Survey and Fellow of the Royal Society.	"In religious matters he was an atheist."
Mikhail Bakunin	1814–1876	Russian philosopher, writer and anarchist.	"We are materialists and atheists, and we glory in the fact."
Iain Banks	1954–2013	Scottish author, writing mainstream fiction as Iain Banks and science fiction as Iain M. Banks.	"I'm an evangelical atheist so I'm not into supernatural effects - I hated The Exorcist - but John Carpenter's remake of The Thing is different."
Javier Bardem	1969–	Spanish actor and former rugby player best known for his role in Jamón, Jamón and No Country For Old Men.	"In a final act of deflection, he explained away all this Oscar business by blaming [Cuban writer Reinaldo] Arenas: "I don't believe in God," he said. "But I do believe in guardian angels. He chose me for his movie."
Dan Barker	1949–	American atheist activist, co-president of the Freedom From Religion Foundation and author of Losing Faith in Faith: From Preacher To Atheist.	"Following five years of reading, Dan gradually outgrew his religious beliefs. "If I had limited myself to Christian authors, I'd still be a Christian today," Dan says. "I just lost faith in faith." He announced his atheism publicly in January, 1984."
John Baskerville	1706–1775	British (English) typesetter, printing innovator and typefounder, designer of the typeface that bears his name.	Baskerville, designer of the type that bears his name and one of Birmingham's best known citizens, was an atheist and anticleric whose will contained a vitriolic attack on the Church."
Sir Patrick Bateson	1939–2017	British biologist and science writer, Emeritus Professor of ethology at Cambridge University, president of the Zoological Society of London, and Fellow of the Royal Society.	"A confirmed agnostic, he [Bateson] was converted to atheism after attending a dinner where he tried to converse with a woman who was a creationist. "For many years what had been good enough for Darwin was good enough for me. Not long after that dreadful dinner, Richard Dawkins wrote to me to ask whether I would publicly affirm my atheism. I could see no reason why not.""
William Bateson	1861–1926	British geneticist, a Fellow of St. John's College, Cambridge, where he eventually became Master. He was the first person to use the term genetics to describe the study of heredity and biological inheritance, and the chief populariser of the ideas of Gregor Mendel following their rediscovery.	"William Bateson was a very militant atheist and a very bitter man, I fancy. Knowing that I was interested in biology, they invited me when I was still a school girl to go down and see the experimental garden. I remarked to him what I thought then, and still think, that doing research must be the most wonderful thing in the world and he snapped at me that it wasn't wonderful at all, it was tedious, disheartening, annoying and anyhow you didn't need an experimental garden to do research."
Bruno Bauer	1809–1882	German philosopher, theologian and historian, the first propounder of the Jesus myth hypothesis.	"Feuerbach's book received criticism from two-quarters: expectedly from Christian theologians but surprisingly, from the atheists Max Stirner and Bruno Bauer."
Charles T. Beaird	1922–2006	American industrialist, investor, newspaper publisher, philanthropist, philosopher, college professor, world traveler, and civic leader, a self-identified "liberal Republican" politician and a champion of civil rights.	"He had many friends across a wide spectrum of economic, social and religious backgrounds, all of whom he respected and honored. While Carolyn [his wife] was a devoted Presbyterian, he was a 'nontheist'."
Simone de Beauvoir	1908–1986	French author and existentialist philosopher, author of novels and monographs on philosophy, politics, social issues and feminism.	"[Beauvoir] remained an atheist until her death." "I cannot be angry at God, in whom I do not believe."
Pierre Berton	1920–2004	Canadian author of non-fiction	"Berton's book, The Comfortable Pew, in which as a lifelong atheist he attacked status quo religiosity, outraged churchgoers. But the wider public came to expect to be challenged by Berton's views."
Matt Besser	1967–	American comedian.	""My name is Matt Besser, and I'm an Arkansas Razorback. My father is a Jew from Little Rock, Ark., my mother was a Christian from Harrison, Ark., and somehow I'm an atheist now living in L.A. I am a Razorback living in the Razorback diaspora." Thus begins Woo Pig Sooie, Matt Besser's one-man comedic rant that fearlessly confronts all the folly and confusion of what it means to be religious in America."
Paul Bettany	1971–	British (English) actor, known for his roles in A Knight's Tale, A Beautiful Mind, Master and Commander: The Far Side of the World and The Da Vinci Code.	"I was brought up Catholic. I'm lapsed. From the age of three I was with the nuns. Now I'm an atheist. I think religion does a lot for us but I can't quite believe it, alas... It's just a personal choice. I love the idea of heaven though. Who doesn't? It's lovely."
Jemima Blackburn	1823–1909	British (Scottish) painter and illustrator, especially of evocative images of rural life in 19th century Scotland.	"Around their dinner table could be found all shades of political and religious affiliation. Hugh was a devout Christian and apolitical, while Jemima's atheism was coupled with a stout defence of Disraeli's brand of toryism."
Simon Blackburn	1944–	British (English) academic philosopher known for his efforts to popularise philosophy.	"Some years ago, without realizing what it might mean, I accepted a dinner invitation from a Jewish colleague for dinner on Friday night. I should say that my colleague had never appeared particularly orthodox, and he would have known that I am an atheist."
Patrick Blackett	1897–1974	British experimental physicist known for his work on cloud chambers, cosmic rays, and paleomagnetism, winner of the Nobel Prize in Physics, Fellow of the Royal Society and awarded OM and CH.	"The grandson of a vicar on his father’s side, Blackett respected religious observances that were established social customs, but described himself as agnostic or atheist."
Russell Blackford	1950–	Australian writer, philosopher, bioethicist, and critic. He is co-editor of the upcoming Voices of Disbelief, a collection of essays by prominent atheists and sceptics.	"It's true that atheists and sceptics have less reason to be aggressive in arguing publicly for our views if we find ourselves in an environment where religion wields little political influence. In those circumstances, there is simply less urgency about speaking up. Those, however, are not the circumstances that we face."
Susan Blackmore	1951–	British psychologist and memeticist, best known for her book The Meme Machine.	In a Point of Inquiry podcast interview, Blackmore described religion as a collection of "really pernicious memes", "I think religious memeplexes are really amongst the nastiest viruses we have on the planet". Blackmore also practices Zen Buddhist meditation; later, when she was asked: "And you find this practice of Zen, the meditative practice, completely compatible with your lack of theism, your atheism...?" She replied: "Oh yes, I mean, there is no god in Buddhism...".
Iwona Blazwick	1955–	British art gallery curator, Director of the Whitechapel Art Gallery in London, art writer and broadcaster, awarded an OBE in 2008.	"The hidden jewel of the year was an impromptu performance by 40 singers from a South African township under the dome of St Paul's Cathedral, which made me - a devout atheist - feel spiritually moved."
Wilfrid Scawen Blunt	1840–1922	British poet, author and diplomat.	"Wilfred Scawen Blunt was notorious as an atheist, a libertine, an adventurer and a poet. Somehow he also found time to be a diplomat - one of the earliest in this country to make a real attempt to understand Islam - and an anti-imperialist, becoming the first British-born person to go to jail for Irish independence."
Hermann Bondi	1919–2005	English-Austrian mathematician and cosmologist, best known for co-developing the steady-state theory of the universe and important contributions to the theory of general relativity and a Fellow of the Royal Society.	"Since his childhood in Vienna Bondi had been an atheist, developing from an early age a view on religion that associated it with repression and intolerance." When presented with a prestigious international award, he divided a large sum of money between the Atheist Centre and women's health projects in Mumbai.
Hafid Bouazza	1970–2021	Moroccan-Dutch author.	"Believers live behind a fence, and non-believers live in a pasture and they know there are believers out there behind the fence." "It [religion] is a matter of conditioning, of brainwashing." "I know that when I die, it's over with me." "Look, I'm an atheist. I believe God does not exist, I do not believe in an afterlife. How terrible it may be: Hitler isn't in hell getting pinched in his ass with a trident. I'm fine with the fact there are people who do believe that and get comfort from it, like my mother. I just hope the influence of religion on policy makers will diminish, because my freedom is precious to me."
William Boyd	1952–	British (Scottish) novelist and screenwriter; recipient of a CBE.	Interviewer: "What song would you like played at your funeral?" Boyd: "We'll Meet Again. I'd like the congregation to join in. As a devout atheist, I should make it clear there are no religious connotations."
Bessie Braddock	1899–1970	British Labour politician, vice-chairman of the party in 1968.	"Mrs. Braddock, whose husband died in 1963, was an atheist, and her funeral service, next Tuesday at Liverpool crematorium, will be non-sectarian."
Charles Bradlaugh	1833–1891	British political activist and Member of Parliament, freethinker, radical and champion of popular causes, and one of the most famous English atheists of the 19th century.	"Excepting to each of the above allegations, I maintain that thoughtful Atheism affords greater possibility for human happiness than any system yet based on, or possible to be founded on, Theism, and that the lives of true Atheists must be more virtuous -- because more human -- than those of the believers in Deity, the humanity of the devout believer often finding itself neutralized by a faith with which that humanity is necessarily in constant collision. [...] Atheism, properly understood, is no mere disbelief; is in no wise a cold, barren negative; it is, on the contrary, a hearty, fruitful affirmation of all truth, and involves the positive assertion of action of highest humanity." Charles Bradlaugh, 'A Plea For Atheism' (1864).
Edvard Brandes	1847–1931	Danish politician, critic and author, Minister of Finance 1909–1910 and 1913–1920.	"Because of his Jewish origin, his atheism, and his "European", rather than "Danish", outlook, Brandes was, from the beginning of his political career, at odds with the more moderate faction of the left coalition that formed the Left Reform Party in the late 1890s."
Brannon Braga	1965–	American TV producer and writer, creator of Star Trek: Enterprise.	"The fact that we're all gathered here today is kind of odd when you think about it, because we really have nothing to talk about other than our conviction that religion sucks, isn't science great, and how the hell do we get the other 95% of the population to come to their senses? We don't believe anything. Therefore, we have no need for a mythology."
Johannes Brahms	1833–1897	German romantic composer.	The religious faith of Brahms is a matter in which he, true to his character, would give varying accounts of in public. He did, however, entrust his true thoughts to a small clique of close friends, among them Bohemian composer Antonín Dvořák. Dvořák once said of Brahms: "Such a man, such a fine soul--and he believes in nothing! He believes in nothing!"
Marshall Brain	1961–2024	American author, founder of HowStuffWorks.	"I am an atheist...I do not believe in any supernatural being, including the god of the bible.
Lily Braun	1865–1916	German feminist writer.	Lily was converted to atheism, pacifism, and feminism by Georg von Gizycki, whom she married in 1893.
Peter Brearey	1939–1998	British secularist, socialist, journalist and atheist activist, Editor of The Freethinker from 1993 until his death.	"He was an old-fashioned rationalist and radical. He detested modern politics and despised Blairite froth, spin-doctoring and cloned MPs and betrayal of principles. I share Peter's doubts about the milk-and-water term "humanism." He and I called ourselves atheists."
Howard Brenton	1942–	British (English) English playwright, who gained notoriety for his 1980 play The Romans in Britain.	"It strikes me as an exceptionally powerful study of the human need for belief in a higher power, notwithstanding the fact that Brenton himself is an atheist. And the dramatist examines the nature of Paul's faith with both sympathy and insight."
André Breton	1896–1966	French writer, poet, artist, and surrealist theorist, best known as the main founder of surrealism.	"A cynical atheist, the poet, critic, and artist harbored an irrepressible streak of romanticism."
Calvin Bridges	1889–1938	American geneticist, known for his work on fruit fly genetics.	"...he always remained true to his own concepts and ideals and did not dissimulate. His open designation of himself as "atheist" in "Who's Who in America" and his opposition to the invasion of the Soviet Union by the Allies..."
Marcus Brigstocke	1973–	British comedian, satirist and presenter of The Late Edition.	On being presented by Richard Dawkins with an Out Campaign T-shirt: "Look at that. Outed, outed as an atheist and proud to be so.
Jim Broadbent	1949–	British (English) Academy Award-, Golden Globe- and BAFTA-winning theatre, film and television actor, regarded as one of cinema's most reliable character actors, and known especially for his roles in Bridget Jones's Diary, Moulin Rouge! and Iris.	"Does the prospect of his own inevitable death frighten him? 'I don't think it does. I don't fret about it. I think it was partly to do with seeing my father go. It didn't frighten him. Upset him a bit but not ... I think if you are an atheist, what's there to be frightened of? ... But I don't want to die yet.' "
Isaac Brock	1975–	American singer, guitarist, banjoist, and songwriter for the indie rock band Modest Mouse.	Interviewer: "Do you still consider yourself an atheist?" Brock: "Pretty much, but there are things that make me think. Like that guy who played Jesus [Jim Caviezel] getting hit by lightning during the filming of that movie? That just makes you think, "I can't be 100 percent sure." But I'm not going to change my game plan anyway. [...] I'm 100 percent on the whole Christianity thing being a crock of shit, pretty much, but I don't give a fuck if other people are religious. Believe what you want. Whatever makes the day easier for you."
Jeremy Brock	1959–	British actor, producer, writer, and director, whose work includes Mrs. Brown and the BAFTA award-winning screenplay for The Last King of Scotland.	"Nor does organised religion emerge with honour, and Brock says he has been an atheist for many years. "My father was an intelligent and articulate advocate for old-fashioned notions of kindness and liberalism, but in the end I just did not feel that loving him was a justification for believing in a whole theocratic system. Religion in certain circles has become increasingly exclusive and aggressive. Fundamentalist attitudes pervade, and that, in its most extreme form, means you can kill anybody you want to because they're an unbeliever.""
Damien Broderick	1944–2025	Australian science fiction and popular science writer. His science fiction novel The Judas Mandala is credited with the first appearance of the term "virtual reality".	"I sat around reading, especially science fiction comics. My father thought this was some absurd weakness of character, and not only that -- this stuff was going to corrupt me and make me an atheist. Luckily, he was right!"
Yaron Brook	1961–	Israeli activist, current president and executive director of the Ayn Rand Institute.	"Anyone who has heard Dr. Yaron Brook lecture on foreign policy would likely call him a militant, unflinching champion of Israel. His loyalty, however, does not derive from his Jewish or Israeli background. He's a proud atheist, who admits to not knowing - or really caring - when the Pessah Seder falls. He relentlessly defends Israel and the West because he puts his faith in the rational, free, individual soul."
Phil Brooks	1978–	American professional wrestler, known by the ring name CM Punk.	"I am an atheist."
Rodney Brooks	1954–	Australian-born American robotics engineer, artificial intelligence and artificial life researcher, and director of the MIT Computer Science and Artificial Intelligence Laboratory.	"I've been an atheist - I had found it difficult to have religious beliefs and scientific ones, but I've accepted that I have a duality - there's a human way of interacting with people but also a mechanistic explanation of what people are and how they work."
Brigid Brophy, Lady Levey	1929–1995	British novelist, essayist, critic, biographer, and dramatist.	"It [her non-fiction book Black Ship to Hell (1962)] endeavoured to formulate a morality based on reason rather than religion—Brophy described herself as 'a natural, logical and happy atheist' (King of a Rainy Country, afterword, 276)."
Derren Brown	1971–	British (English) psychological illusionist, mentalist, and skeptic of paranormal phenomena.	"[Richard Dawkins's book] The God Delusion is a very important defence of atheism, and systematically looks at every aspect of faith and 'proofs' of God's existence. [...] For atheists like me, it's an addictive and wonderful read which argues comprehensively and convincingly for the fallacy of religious belief."
Lori Lipman Brown	1958–	American politician, lobbyist, lawyer, educator, and social worker supporter, Nevada Senator 1992–1994.	""You can be elected as an openly gay politician in this country, but you can't be elected as an openly atheistic one," said Lori Lipman Brown, who was hired last fall to be the Washington, D.C., lobbyist for an organization devoted to atheist causes, the Secular Coalition for America. She's believed to be the first paid lobbyist for the unbelievers in the nation's capital, the front lines of the culture wars. Now, all Brown is seeking is a constituency willing to go public. "Think of where the LGBT movement was 25 years ago," said Brown, who has worked on gay and lesbian rights issues as a legislator and attorney. "That's where atheists are today." [...] Brown, who is married and was raised a "humanistic Jew," talks about how she "came out" as an atheist several years ago, and how most atheists aren't "out yet" at work. She says atheist kids—like many gay children—are made to feel outcasts at school, and explains that she wants to erase the negative connotation to the word "atheist" just as homosexuals have reclaimed slurs like "queer" and "dyke.""
William Montgomery Brown	1855–1937	American Episcopal bishop, communist author and atheist activist.	"An ecclesiastical court [...] sitting at Cleveland, Ohio, yesterday, found Dr. William Montgomery Brown, retired Bishop of Arkansas, a self-styled "Christian Atheist", guilty of heresy."
Alan Brownjohn	1931–	British poet and novelist.	"Brownjohn is 75 at the moment of publication. He has been on the literary scene - publishing, reviewing, judging, chairing, tutoring, giving readings - since the 1950s. He has also been a London borough councillor, a Labour parliamentary candidate (Richmond, Surrey, 1964), very much what I think of as decent, persistent, dogged "Old Labour" - sensitive but solid, inclining towards the puritan (though a self-confessed atheist in matters of religion) - and a strenuous campaigner for serious radio and television, anti-muzak, anti-destruction of libraries, for the proper traditional cultural concerns of the British Council, et al."
Ruth Mack Brunswick	1897–1946	American psychologist, a close confidant of and collaborator with Sigmund Freud.	"Although in her youth she had shared her father's Zionist sympathies, she was not otherwise involved in Jewish affairs and was by conviction an atheist."
Ludwig Büchner	1824–1899	German philosopher, physiologist and physician who became one of the exponents of 19th century scientific materialism.	"Büchner's materialistic interpretation of the universe in Kraft und Stoff created an uproar for its rejection of God, creation, religion, and free will and for its explanation of mind and consciousness as physical states of the brain produced by matter in motion. His continued defense of atheism and atomism and his denial of any distinction between mind and matter (Natur und Geist, 1857; "Nature and Spirit") appealed strongly to freethinkers, but dialectical materialists condemned his acceptance of competitive capitalism, which Büchner viewed as an example of Charles Darwin's "struggle for survival.""
Mario Bunge	1919–2020	Argentine-Canadian philosopher and physicist. His philosophical writings combined scientific realism, systemism, materialism, emergentism, and other principles.	"Death is not a mystery to those who know something about biology. Death does not scare an atheist, because he knows that nothing can happen to him after death. The only thing that may scare you is a slow and painful death, but assisted death frees us from this fear."
Luis Buñuel	1900–1983	Spanish-born Mexican filmmaker, activist of the surrealist movement, considered one of Mexico's finest directors, and one of the most important directors in the history of cinema.	"Father Julian... and I often talk about faith and the existence of God, but... he's forever coming up against the stone wall of my atheism..." Buñuel is also known for his one-liner, "Thank God I'm still an atheist."
Geoffrey Burgon	1941–2010	British composer known especially for his television and film themes.	"Geoffrey Burgon [...] has declined a generous Hollywood offer to write the music for award-winning John Carpenter's remake of The Thing, a 1950s horror film. An atheist with a remarkable feel for "church" music, Burgon tells me that time prevents his crossing the Atlantic; he is busy writing two operas [...]"
Lawrence Bush	1951–	American author of several books of Jewish fiction and non-fiction, including Waiting for God: The Spiritual Explorations of a Reluctant Atheist.	"Caught between the atheism of his parents and the religion of his peers, Bush writes from what he calls "my own peculiar perch as an atheist who has nevertheless worked intimately in Jewish religious institutions as a writer and editor for much of my adult life." As a result, he writes about non-belief with an empathy for believers missing from the works of the New Atheists. [...] Bush may be reluctant, but he remains an atheist: "No matter how therapeutic religious observance might be for individuals, no matter how beguiling the symbols, metaphors, ceremonies, and community spirit, there is something about the surrender to God and to a prescribed worship tradition that simply offends my arrogant soul.""
Henry Burstow	1826–1916	British shoemaker, singer and bellringer from Horsham, Sussex, best known for his vast repertoire of songs, many of which were collected in the folksong revival of the late nineteenth and early twentieth centuries.	"Burstow was a fascinating man. A shoemaker by trade, he shared the radical and non-conformist attitudes of many who followed the gentle craft. His reading included Darwin and Lyle and he was a convinced atheist, this in spite of the fact that he was a well known church bell-ringer."
Ferruccio Busoni	1866–1924	Italian composer, pianist, teacher of piano and composition, and conductor.	"Aside from his undisputed powers as composer, pianist and man of letters, Busoni was an enterprising (if sometimes erratic) conductor, a passionate bibliophile, a talented draughtsman and a bon vivant. Baptized into the Catholic church, he was at heart an atheist; a lucid commentator on world affairs, he remained politically uncommitted."
Mary Butts	1890–1937	British modernist writer.	"By this time she had become an atheist and socialist."
Kari Byron	1974–	San Francisco-based television host and artist, best known for her featured role on the Discovery Channel show MythBusters.	"I am an atheist, but I don’t begrudge anyone for whatever belief systems they hold." - Byron in an interview with Suicide Girls.
