= List of atheists (surnames C to D) =

Notable atheists with surnames starting C and D, sortable by the field for which they are mainly known and nationality.

Name	Dates	Known as / for	Who	Reference
João Cabral de Melo Neto	1920–1999	Author	Brazilian poet, considered one of the greatest Brazilian poets of all time.	"Though an atheist, Cabral had a deep, atavistic fear of the devil. When his wife died in 1986, he placed an emblem of Our Lady of Carmen around her neck, saying, in his mocking way, that this would make sure that she went directly to heaven, without being stopped at customs."
Peter Caffrey	1949–2008	Actor	Irish actor, best known for playing Padraig O'Kelly in Series 1-4 of Ballykissangel.	"Born in Dublin in 1949, Caffrey enjoyed acting in school plays but subsequently went to a seminary for two years with a view to becoming a priest (he later played one in Coronation Street). He came out an atheist and studied English at University College, Dublin, before teaching at a primary school for a year."
James Cameron	1954–	Film director, producer, screenwriter, editor, and inventor	Best known for his films The Terminator (1984), Aliens (1986), The Abyss (1989), Terminator 2: Judgment Day (1991), Titanic (1997), and Avatar (2009).	"I've sworn off agnosticism, which I now call cowardly atheism. I've come to the position that in the complete absence of any supporting data whatsoever for the persistence of the individual in some spiritual form, it is necessary to operate under the provisional conclusion that there is no afterlife and then be ready to amend that if I find out otherwise."
Ruy Castro	1948–	Brazilian journalist and writer	Best known for his books Chega de Saudade: A história e as histórias da Bossa Nova (1990), O Anjo Pornográfico: A vida de Nelson Rodrigues (1992), Estrela Solitária: Um Brasileiro Chamado Garrincha (1995) , and Carmen – Uma biografia (2005).	"I’ve never been a member of the Workers’ Party, I’ve never been a communist, and I’ve never had any ties to any organized political party, nor to any organized religion. I’ve been an atheist since I was ten years old. I’ve always, or perhaps I should say. I’m not a member of any organized soccer club either. Everyone knows I’m a Flamengo fan, but I’ve never been a member of Flamengo."
Richard Carleton	1943–2006	Journalist	Australian television journalist for 60 Minutes.	"Richard Carleton was a devout atheist whose cynicism about an after-life made Kerry Packer look like a wimp. He would have hated the way I end this piece. But he had soul."
Adam Carolla	1964–	Comedian/Radio Personality	American.	"I am not agnostic. I am atheist. I don’t think there is no God, I know there’s no God. I know there’s no God same way I know many other laws in our universe. I know there’s no God and I know most of the world knows that as well. They just won’t admit it because there’s another thing they know. They know they’re going to die and it freaks them out. So most people don’t have the courage to admit there’s no God and they know it. They feel it. They try to suppress it. And if you bring it up they get angry because it freaks them out."
Asia Carrera	1973–	Actress (pornographic)	American former pornographic actress.	"So me, the completely unsuperstitious atheist, goes and posts on a message board that 'no, I don't believe in bad luck on Friday the 13th'."
Richard Carrier	1969–	Atheist activist	American historian and philosopher, best known for his writings on Internet Infidels, where he served as Editor-in-Chief for several years.	"Religious Background: Parents were freethinking Methodists (mother was church secretary); Went to Sunday School, and to church on holy days; Philosophical Taoist at the age of 15; Atheist (Secular Humanist) at the age of 21; Extensive study of philosophy and world religions, formal and informal"
Angela Carter	1940–1992	Author	British (English) novelist and journalist, known for her feminist, magical realism and science fiction works.	"All the mythic versions of women, from the myth of the redeeming purity of the virgin to that of the healing, reconciling mother, are consolatory nonsenses; and consolatory nonsense seems to me a fair definition of myth, anyway. Mother goddesses are just as silly a notion as father gods. If a revival of the myths of these cults gives women emotional satisfaction, it does so at the price of obscuring the real conditions of life. This is why they were invented in the first place."
Henri Cartier-Bresson	1908–2004	Visual arts (photography)	French photographer considered to be the father of modern photojournalism, an early adopter of 35 mm format, and the master of candid photography, who helped develop the influential "street photography" style.	"He loved the great Renaissance geometer painters, especially Ucello and Piero della Francesca, in whom he saw confirmation of his conviction that geometry is the necessary foundation of all art - see, for instance, his beautiful and mysteriously moving study of wall and plane tree on the banks of the Seine in 1936. 'I don't believe in God,' he once said to me, 'but I do believe in pi,' and then wrote down some numbers on a table napkin which I recognised as the formula for the golden section, the mathematical rule of aesthetic balance which has been used by artists since antiquity."
Robin Cavendish	1930–1994	Activist, medical aid developer	British disability rights advocate, a pioneering developer of medical aids for the disabled, and known for being one of the longest-lived "responauts" in Britain.	"It is a strange irony that, though professing to be an unbeliever himself, he had a capacity for making other people feel closer to God."
Vic Chesnutt	1964–2009	Musician	American singer-songwriter.	"Chesnutt's contrary nature was forged in isolation, in the backwoods of Pine County, Georgia. Though he loved the closeness of nature, and was loved by friends and parents, he found himself "at odds with the Protestant power structure". "I had a revelation that I was an atheist at a very early age," he remembers, "and I bumped up with these fuckers my whole time there. Sometimes it felt great to be at war with them. But I knew I needed to go somewhere else.""
Noam Chomsky	1928–	Linguist, political analyst and activist		
Greta Christina	1961–	Writer	American atheist blogger, speaker, and author.	"The Top Ten Reasons I Don't Believe In God" by Greta Christina.
Sir Arthur C. Clarke	1917–2008	Author	British (English) scientist and science-fiction author.	"...Stanley [Kubrick] is a Jew and I'm an atheist."
Nick Clegg	1967-	Politician	Former Deputy Prime Minister of the United Kingdom, Lord President of the Council, and the British Liberal Democrat Leader from 2007 to 2015.	"I don't believe in God"
Edward Clodd	1840–1930	Author	British (English) banker, writer and anthropologist, an early populariser of evolution, keen folklorist and chairman of the Rationalist Press Association.	"We can only guess what Clodd would have thought of having an evangelical preacher owning his old house: he was a noted atheist, who rejected his parents' ambition for him to become a Baptist minister in favour of becoming chairman of the Rationalist Press Association. His contribution to literature was in popularising the work of Charles Darwin and other evolutionary scientists in the face of opposition from the church. "The story of creation," wrote Clodd, " is the story of gas into genius"."
Claud Cockburn	1904–1981	Author	British (English) writer and journalist, controversial for his communist sympathies.	"For one whose life had been so full of ironies, it was fitting that five priests celebrated a requiem mass for him in Youghal, although he had been a committed atheist."
Chapman Cohen	1868–1954	Atheist activist	British (English) freethought writer and lecturer, and an editor of The Freethinker and president of the National Secular Society.	"Cohen was a witty, courteous, and effective public speaker and debater, and a prolific writer with over fifty titles to his credit. Typical of his writings are A Grammar of Freethought (1921), Theism or Atheism (1921), Materialism Restated (1927), and four series of Essays in Freethinking (1923–38), culled from occasional pieces in the Freethinker. His achievement was to transform Victorian freethought from an emphasis on anti-biblical argument to the positive advocacy of materialism [...]".
Nick Cohen	1961–	Journalist	British journalist, author, and political commentator.	"My name is Nick Cohen, and I think I'm turning into a Jew. Despite being called "Cohen", I've never been Jewish before. It's not simply that I am an atheist. My Jewish friends tell me that it is hard to find an educated London Jew who is not an atheist, but that I have no connection with Jewish culture."
G. D. H. Cole	1889–1959	Author	British (English) political theorist, economist, writer and historian.	"An unlikely friendship developed between Reckitt and G. D. H. Cole. Although an unapproachable cold atheist, and at root an anarchist, Cole joined forces with Reckitt, the clubbable, romantic medievalist, archetypal bourgeois, and unswerving Anglican with a dogmatic faith, to found the National Guilds League in 1915."
Eddie Collins (a.k.a. Greydon Square)	1981–	Musician	African-American hip hop artist.	"Written, produced and recorded by Greydon Square, The Compton Effect fuses atheism, critical thinking, and rationality with hip hop to spread free-thought and education about the dangers of faith and religion. It's a giant step towards the enlightenment of urban culture's dependency on religious indoctrination. "This is music that transcends genres," says Greydon. "This is bigger than just hip hop, these are cultural issues that need to be addressed before humanity can safely take another evolutionary step. I am the minority of the minority, an African-American atheist, from a community that does not tolerate threats to the status quote unless it's based on religion. This album is the manifestation of the thought, research and education that has been used to free myself from the shackles of religion.""
Mario Sergio Conti	1954–	Journalist and writer	Brazilian journalist. He writes for Folha de S. Paulo and is a news anchor for GloboNews.	"The idea of God persists because in the consumer society billions do not consume. Religions fulfill the function of giving imaginary relief to those who don't have it in real, material life."
Dame Ivy Compton-Burnett	1884–1969	Author	British (English) novelist, awarded the 1955 James Tait Black Memorial Prize for her novel Mother and Son.	"Like Margaret Jourdain, and most of her characters who are not fools or knaves, Ivy Compton-Burnett was a firm atheist, dismissing religion because ‘No good can come of it’ (Spurling, Ivy when Young, 77)."
Pat Condell	1949–	Comedian	Atheist comedian, best known for his internet videos.	"The atheist comedian Pat Condell (who we are pleased to say is a member of the NSS) placed a five-minute "video monologue" entitled "The Trouble with Islam" on the web and it has now scored over a million hits."
Cyril Connolly	1903–1974	Author	British (English) intellectual, literary critic and writer.	"'Don't stand any nonsense from the Astors,' Sitwell concluded: prophetic advice, for within a short time of his arrival, Lord Astor was writing to the new literary editor to say that reviewers must combine 'ability and character and high ideals': he was especially worried in case A.L. Rowse proved a 'militant atheist', for 'I am convinced that our great influence in the world is due to the fact that this country has given a definite place to religion and to free religion, i.e. Protestantism at that.' Undaunted, Connolly made it plain in his reply that he would not put up with such nonsense: he himself was an atheist, and discerned no difference in behaviour between an English Protestant and an English atheist."
Edmund Cooper	1926–1982	Author	British (English) poet and prolific writer of speculative fiction and other genres, published under his own name and several pen names.	"I'm an atheist. God is an abstract noun, he's not a Father Christmas up there in Heaven, he's an abstract bloody noun who has been exploited by men in order to exploit other men, through the centuries."
William Cooper	1910–2002	Author	British (English) novelist	"As a militant atheist he was especially on his guard in churches, and at the wedding of a much younger friend had to be restrained from heckling the bride's clerical uncle, who was delivering an address."
Chris Corner	1974–	Singer	British (English) singer/songwriter	"BLURT: On your new album, in the song "The Stupid, The Proud" you sing, "God, is dead, we get to sleep tonight." On your previous album, in the song "This Will Make You Love Again," you sing, "your supermarket Jesus comes with smiles and lies." And on your blog you've been open about being an atheist. Do you have resentment towards organized religion and where does this atheism stem from? CORNER: I think it stems from my search for reason and evidence in life. It's not that I don't think things don't exist if I don't have proof. It's just that if I say something exists, I think it should be based on some kind of evidence. The problem with organized religion is that most of it is not based on evidence. It's just not enough for me to put my whole confidence and faith in something that is not grounded on evidence. The only thing that really is kind of my religion is being creative. I'm not criticizing people for being religious, because it gives people a lot of hope. I just think, for me, it has to be based on evidence".
Sir Noël Coward	1899–1973	Actor	British (English) actor, playwright and composer of popular music.	"His unashamed patriotism galvanised the nation. One wonders whether these admirers would have laughed so heartily or wept so freely if they had thought that they were being entertained and moved by a homosexual atheist of the most militant kind. A letter to his mother on the early death of his brother out-Dawkinses Dawkins: "I'm saying several acid prayers to a fat contented God the Father in a dirty night gown who hates you and me and every living creature in the world.""
Prof Brian Cox	1968–	Scientist	British particle physicist, a Royal Society research fellow, and a professor at the University of Manchester. He also works on the ATLAS experiment at the Large Hadron Collider, CERN near Geneva, Switzerland. He is best known to the public as the presenter of a number of science programmes for the BBC.	"[...] as far as I am concerned we are information processing devices, which requires energy [...] we convert food for energy [...] we are basically heat engines. This is how steam engines work, and fridges. [...] So if there is an afterlife, I would have to reconsider the engineering design of fridges. With a very critical eye."
Jerry Coyne	1949–	Scientist	American professor of biology, known for his books on evolution and commentary on the intelligent design debate.	"Yet they [the NCSE] can afford to ignore us because, in the end, where else can we atheists go for support against creationists? [...] Am I grousing because, as an atheist and a non-accommodationist, my views are simply ignored by the NAS and NCSE? Not at all. I don't want these organizations to espouse or include my viewpoint. I want religion and atheism left completely out of all the official discourse of scientific societies and organizations that promote evolution."
Jim Crace	1946–	Author	British (English) writer and novelist, winner of numerous awards.	"The impulse of this book came when I was writing Quarantine. At the end of writing that book, I was no less of an atheist than I was before, yet it did make me think about my atheism. Thinking about the bleakness of my own atheism, and the inadequacy of the old fashioned kind of atheism when the big events of life—especially death—came along, made me want to see whether I could come up with a narrative of comfort, a false narrative of comfort, but one that could match the narratives of comfort religions come up with to get you through death and bereavement."
Jonny Craig	1986–	Musician	Canadian singer-songwriter for post-hardcore band Emarosa and co-leader of Isles & Glaciers.	Jonny Craig stated in a video interview quote: "I personally am atheist, but I grew up Christian. If you believe there is a god or are religious, I'm all for it. But if you don't believe in a god, you shouldn't be prosecuted for it, but it also goes both ways."
David Cronenberg	1943–	Film director	Canadian film director, one of the principal originators of the 'body horror' genre.	"Cronenberg's parents were atheists who encouraged him to experiment spiritually, convinced that sooner or later he'd find his own path to godlessness. And he did. This lack of belief, which became a belief system in itself, informs so much of his work: the primacy of the body, the finality of death, the lack of consolation. "It was apparent to me that religion was an invented thing," he says, "a wish-fulfilment thing, a fantasy thing. It was much more real, dangerous, to accept that mortality was the end for you as an individual. As an atheist, I don't believe in an afterlife, so if you're thinking of murder, if your subject is murder, then that's a physical act of absolute destruction because you're ending something, a body, that is unique. That person never existed before, will never exist again, will not be karmically recycled, will not go to heaven, therefore I take it seriously.""
Mackenzie Crook	1971–	Actor and comedian	British (English) actor and comedian, known for playing Gareth Keenan in The Office and Ragetti in Pirates of the Caribbean.	"I don't believe in life after death. I'm a staunch atheist and I know when I die that will be it, I'll just blink out of existence. It's not an incredibly comforting thought but I'm completely at peace with that idea and it just makes me appreciate this life all the more. It's almost a panic to get as much done and to have as much experience as possible."
S. E. Cupp	1979–	Political commentator and writer	She is co-author of Why You're Wrong About the Right, with Brett Joshpe, and the sole author of Losing Our Religion: The Liberal Media's Attack on Christianity.	"I am an atheist. I have been an atheist for fifteen years. ... I believe ... that Judeo-Christian values, religious tolerance, an objective press, the benevolence of Christianity, and civility and decency make for a better American democracy."
Theodore Dalrymple	1949–	Author	British (English) writer and retired physician, who has written extensively on culture, art, politics, education and medicine, drawing upon his experience as a doctor and psychiatrist in Zimbabwe and Tanzania, and more recently at a prison and a public hospital in Birmingham.	Criticising the 'New Atheists' (Harris, Hitchens, Dawkins, Dennett, Grayling and co.), Dalrymple wrote: "Yet with the possible exception of Dennett's [book Breaking the Spell], they advance no argument that I, the village atheist, could not have made by the age of 14 (Saint Anselm's ontological argument for God's existence gave me the greatest difficulty, but I had taken Hume to heart on the weakness of the argument from design)."
Alan Davies	1966–	Comedian and actor	British (English) comedian, writer and actor, best known for starring as Jonathan Creek on the popular TV mystery series, and more recently as a permanent panellist on the TV quiz show QI.	"Why do people believe all this stuff, Stephen? (...) Bronze age mythology and they believe it all! (...) Why do they believe it all? Can't they just go: 'all that was mad. I thought it was true for a minute'."
Rhys Davies	1901–1978	Author	British (Welsh) novelist and short story writer.	"As a boy he attended a nonconformist chapel, and later an Anglican church, but in later life was to declare himself an atheist."
Russell T Davies	1963–	Television producer and writer	British (Welsh) television producer and writer, most famous for reviving Doctor Who on British television.	"As writer and executive producer of Doctor Who, Davies often plays with religious imagery (from a cross-shaped space station to robot angels with halos), but he's a fervent believer in [Richard] Dawkins. "He has brought atheism proudly out of the closet!""
Terence Davies	1945–	Film director and actor	British (English) screenwriter, film director, actor and novelist.	"A fervently Roman Catholic child - he talks of his "dogged piety" and of "years wasted in useless prayer" - Davies has now embraced atheism with a born-again zeal."
William B. Davis	1938–	Actor	Canadian actor, known for his role as the Cigarette Smoking Man in The X-Files.	Interviewer: "You're a second generation atheist. While in college, did you have a skeptical attitude toward the paranormal? Was it something you thought about at the time?" Davis: "I was always skeptical of ghosts, or aliens, or whatever it might be."
Frank Dalby Davison	1893–1970	Author	Australian novelist and short story writer, best known for his animal stories and sensitive interpretations of Australian bush life.	"Davison died on 24 May 1970 at Greensborough, Melbourne; a lifelong atheist, he was cremated after a secular funeral."
Bernard Davis	1916–1994	Biologist	A leading figure in biology, with his major contributions in microbial physiology and metabolism. Davis was a prominent figure at Harvard Medical School in microbiology and in national science policy.	"A nonobservant Jew, he insisted on atheism."
Richard Dawkins	1941–	Biologist	British geneticist and author famous for his radical denunciations of religious belief.	Dawkins contends that a supernatural creator almost certainly does not exist and that faith qualifies as a delusion − as a fixed false belief.
Frederick Delius	1862–1934	Musician	British (English) composer whose luscious harmonies blended Impressionism with the slightly older post-romanticism and northern European and African-American folk idioms. Awarded the Order of the Companions of Honour.	"In the Mass of Life (1904–05) Delius testified to his atheism. With Cassirer's assistance, he selected the words from Nietzsche's prose-poem Also sprach Zarathustra [...] In music that touches extreme poles of physical energy and rapt contemplation, Delius celebrates the human 'Will' and the 'Individual', and the 'Eternal Recurrence of Nature'."
Deng Pufang	1944–	Activist	Chinese handicapped people's rights activist, first son of China's former Paramount leader Deng Xiaoping.	"Mother Teresa of Calcutta told the handicapped son of China's leader, Deng Xiaoping, yesterday that his efforts for the disabled showed he loved God. 'But I am an atheist,' said Deng Pufang, whose legs were paralysed when fellow students forced him out of a window during the Cultural Revolution."
Marquis de Sade	1740–1814	Author	French aristocrat, revolutionary and writer of philosophy-laden and often violent pornography.	"De Sade overcame his boredom and anger in prison by writing sexually graphic novels and plays. In July 1782 he finished his Dialogue entre un prêtre et un moribond (Dialogue Between a Priest and a Dying Man), in which he declared himself an atheist."
Frans de Waal	1948–	Primatologist and ethologist	Dutch primatologist and ethologist. Charles Howard Candler Professor of Primate Behavior at Emory University in Atlanta, Georgia, director of the Living Links Center at the Yerkes National Primate Research Center at Emory, and author of numerous books.	" After I left home for the university, at the age of seventeen, I quickly lost any remnant of religiosity"
Andrew Denton	1960–	Television presenter	Australian comedian and Gold Logie-winning television presenter, and is the host of the ABC's weekly interview program Enough Rope.	"Gentlemen, frankly I'm atheist,..."
Isaac Deutscher	1907–1967	Author	British (English) journalist, historian and biographer.	"He rejected his father's ambition to make him a rabbi. Instead he became an atheist and, following in the footsteps of Marx, Trotsky, and his countrywoman Rosa Luxemburg, a lifelong 'non-Jewish Jew' (Non-Jewish Jew, ed. Deutscher)."
Ian "Dicko" Dickson	1963–	Musician	British (English)-born music industry and television personality in Australia, best known as a judge on the television shows Australian Idol and The Next Great American Band.	"I have developed a spirituality which I suppose you could call metaphysics or science of mind - nothing to do with Scientology, I hasten to add. It's something that was developed by a guy called Ernest Holmes, and it's about the law of the universe, the law of attraction. It's all that stuff that's been popular on The Secret but there's far more to it than that. I'm an atheist but I've got a spirituality I can fall back on. I don't like religion because I see it as a bureaucracy of faith and I've never really been big on bureaucracy."
Marlene Dietrich	1901–1992	Actress	German-born American actress, singer and entertainer, considered to be the first German actress to flourish in Hollywood.	"I have given up belief in a God."
Ani DiFranco	1970–	Musician	American Grammy Award winning singer, guitarist and songwriter.	"Q: What song proves to you that there is a God? Ani: "I'm an atheist, for Chrissake!""
Matt Dillahunty	1969–	Broadcaster and speaker	American president of the Atheist Community of Austin, and is also a host of the live internet radio show "Non-Prophets Radio" and of the Austin TV access show The Atheist Experience	"After the first couple of years of detailed investigation, reason forced me to acknowledge that my faith had not only been weakened by my studies - it had been utterly destroyed. The thoughts, writings and wisdom of people like; Robert Ingersoll, Voltaire, Dan Barker, Richard Dawkins, Farrell Till and many others, helped free my mind from the shackles of religion without a single moment of despair."
Thomas M. Disch	1940–2008	Author	American science fiction author and poet, winner of several awards.	"Friends said Disch had been despondent over ill health and Naylor's death in 2005. Yet he seemed in good humor for a brief Publishers Weekly interview last spring about his most recent book, "The Word of God." An outspoken atheist, Disch adopted the deity's perspective to score points on the absurdity of hell and similar numinous postulates. "One of the wonderful things about being God is you can say such nonsense and it's all true," he said."
Beth Ditto	1981–	Musician	American vocalist with the band Gossip.	""Southern life really was God-fearing. Granny Ditto was a strict Pentecostal, with hair down to her knees. I said in an interview not long ago that I didn't believe in God, and people called my mother saying, 'How do you feel about Beth being an atheist?'" She realised she was gay when she was only five years old. "I loved the sound of women's voices, not those of guys. I would pray because I didn't want to go to hell." She's not joking; her eyes fill with tears. "In my teens, my motor skills quit, I was shaking all the time." Did her pubic hair really turn white? "Yes. In fact, it's still half white!" A revelation about her atheism, at 19, saved Ditto from her fate. "I realised that every 2,000 years, there's a religion that happens to rule, and Christianity is just today's religion," she says."
Stanley Donen	1924–2019	Film director	American film director, best known for his musicals including Seven Brides for Seven Brothers and Singin' in the Rain; awarded honorary Academy Award for lifetime achievement.	
Amanda Donohoe	1962–	Actress	British (English) film, stage and television actress.	Speaking about her role in the film The Lair of the White Worm, Donohoe said: "I'm an atheist, so it was actually a joy. Spitting on Christ was a great deal of fun. I can't embrace a male god who has persecuted female sexuality throughout the ages. And that persecution still goes on today all over the world."
Margaret Downey	1950–	Atheist activist	American atheist activist, former President of Atheist Alliance International.	"Margaret read literary works of Thomas Paine and Robert G. Ingersoll which enabled her to develop a keen sense of revolutionary thought. She became an openly declared Atheist and activist in her twenties. Free from the constraints of religious dogma and patriarchal systems, Margaret became involved with the feminist movement. She fought for basic rights such as freedom of expression, freedom of choice, personal family leave for working parents, equal pay and promotion opportunities for women."
Roddy Doyle	1958–	Author	Irish novelist, dramatist and screenwriter, winner of the Booker Prize in 1993.	"He does appreciate the new and confident pluralism that has loosened the grip of the Roman Catholic hierarchy on education. His three children attend secular state schools, and he welcomes the widening "rift between Church and state. It has happened, it is happening, and for me that's a great thing. As an atheist, I feel very comfortable in Ireland now."" The 53-year-old Dubliner, who will be the headline performer at the start of the 10-day Telegraph Bath Festival Of Children's Literature, said: "I'm an atheist so I suppose that was part of the challenge of writing about a ghost. Strictly speaking, I don't believe in anything."
Ruth Dudley Edwards	1944–	Author	Irish historian, crime novelist, journalist and broadcaster.	"Tariq likes permanent revolution, whereas I am a libertarian conservative. True, we are both atheists, but Tariq is evangelical while I am benign about religion and think the Throne should be occupied by a member of the Church of England."
Carol Ann Duffy	1955–	Author	British (Scottish) poet, playwright and freelance writer, winner of several awards, current Poet Laureate of the United Kingdom.	"But the 21st century has done nothing to prevent two others from the Manchester area from reshaping and modernising the Christmas story - the poet Carol Ann Duffy and the composer Sasha Johnson Manning, who have written 16 new carols. Duffy, brought up a Catholic, pronounces herself an atheist; Johnson Manning is a committed Christian."
Turan Dursun	1934–1990	Author	Turkish Islamic scholar, former imam and mufti, author of a number of books about religion, an open critic of religion and was frequently threatened by fundamentalists.	"Turan Dursun, a former imam and an atheist writer..."

== Notes ==
a: A person permanently dependent upon a mechanical ventilator to maintain breathing.
