= Augusto Meyer =

Brazilian poet, journalist, and folklorist

- Augusto Meyer in 1961
- Born: January 24, 1902; Porto Alegre, Brazil
- Died: July 10, 1970 (aged 68); Rio de Janeiro, Brazil
- Occupation: Journalist
- Writing career
- Genre: Poet
- Notable awards: Prêmio Machado de Assis

Augusto Meyer (born in Porto Alegre on January 24, 1902; died in Rio de Janeiro on July 10, 1970) was a Brazilian poet, journalist, literary critic, and folklorist. He won the Prêmio Machado de Assis in 1948.

== Works ==
=== As a poet ===
- A ilusão querida (1923)
- Coração verde (1926)
- Giraluz (1928)
- Duas orações (1928)
- Poemas de Bilu (1929)
- Sorriso interior (1930)
- Literatura & poesia, poema em prosa (1931)
- Poesias 1922-1955 (1957)
- Antologia poética (1966)

=== As a crític and essayist ===
- Machado de Assis (1935)
- Prosa dos pagos(1943)
- À sombra da estante (1947)
- Le Bateau ivre. Análise e interpretação (1955)
- Preto & Branco (1956)
- Gaúcho, história de uma palavra (1957)
- Camões, o bruxo e outros estudos (1958)
- A chave e a máscara (1964)
- A forma secreta (1965)

=== As a folklorist ===
- Guia do folclore gaúcho (1951)
- CCancioneiro gaúcho (1952)
- Seleta em prosa e verso (1973)

=== As a memorialist ===
- Segredos da infância (1949)
- No tempo da flor (1966)

Preceded by Hélio Lobo	Brazilian Academy of Letters - Occupant of the 13th chair 1961 — 1970	Succeeded by Francisco de Assis Barbosa
