= Francisco de Assis Barbosa =

Brazilian writer (1914–1991)

Francisco de Assis Barbosa

Francisco de Assis Barbosa (Guaratinguetá, January 21, 1914 – Rio de Janeiro, December 8, 1991) was a Brazilian biographer, essayist, historian, and journalist. He was a member of the Brazilian Academy of Letters.

Preceded by Augusto Meyer	Brazilian Academy of Letters - Occupant of the 13th chair 1970 — 1991	Succeeded by Sérgio Paulo Rouanet
