= Rouanet Law =

Brazilian art and culture subsidy

The Rouanet Law is a Brazilian law, named after Sérgio Paulo Rouanet, whose role is providing monetary funds for use in art and culture, including the production of movies. It is intended to encourage cultural investments and its major highlight is the tax incentive policy that enables companies and citizens to deduct a portion of income tax.

All projects must be approved by the Brazilian Ministry of Culture that examines technical feasibility of activities.

== Controversies ==
Despite the pros, there is criticism against the law, which include the possibility of funds being misappropriated. Critics also argue that the Ministry, rather than directly investing in culture, began to let companies themselves decide which kind of culture deserved to be sponsored.

The government's incentives to culture sums up to R$310 million (approximately US$82 million), in which R$30 million (U$8 million) goes to the National Arts Foundation and R$280 million (U$74 million) to the Rouanet Law, while the tax incentive no longer collects R$1 billion (US$263 million) to the Treasury.

In 2018, an attempt to revoke the Rouanet Law ruled the Federal Senate. The 2017 Legislative Suggestion Nº 49 requested the revocation of the law, but was rejected by the Human Rights Commission and Participatory Legislation of the Senate, following the report of Senator Marta Suplicy.
