= List of atheist Armenians =

This list of atheist Armenians includes ethnic Armenian atheists, including those of partial Armenian ancestry from the widespread diaspora. The native Armenian word for "atheist" is "godless" (classical Armenian: անաստուած, reformed spelling: անաստված, anastvats).

== List ==
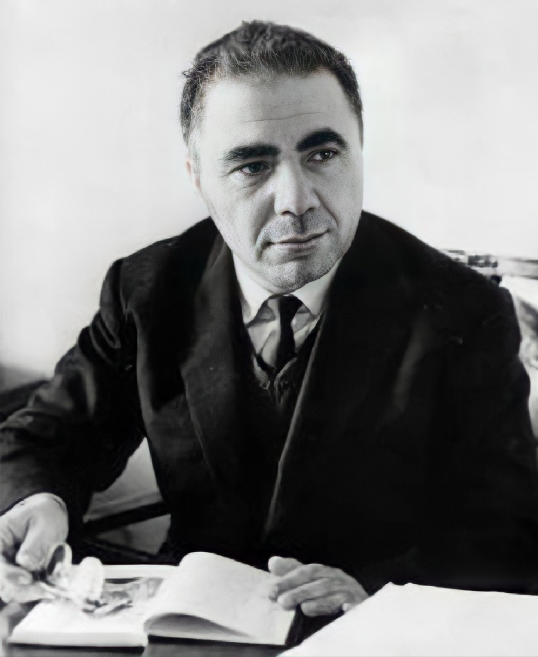
Ambartsumian

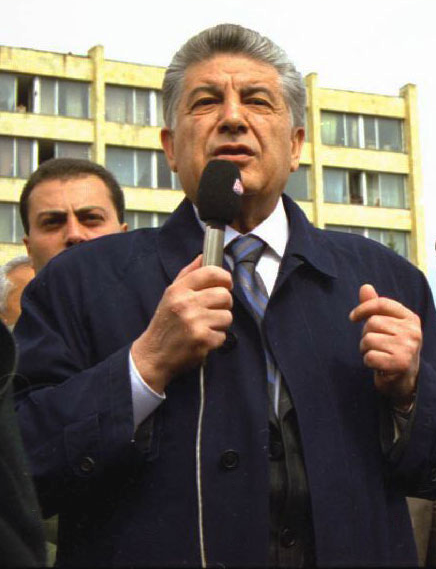
Demirchyan

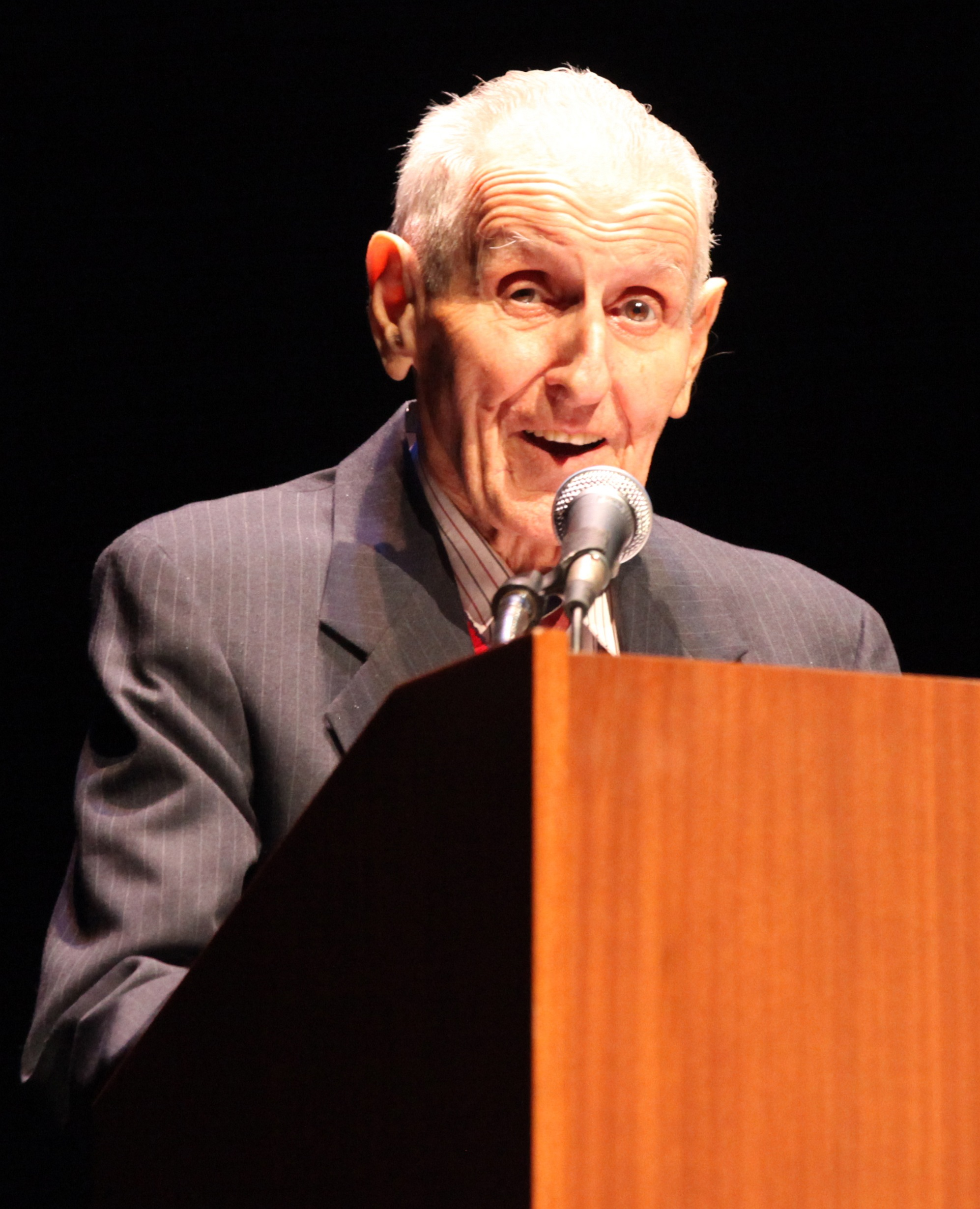
Kevorkian

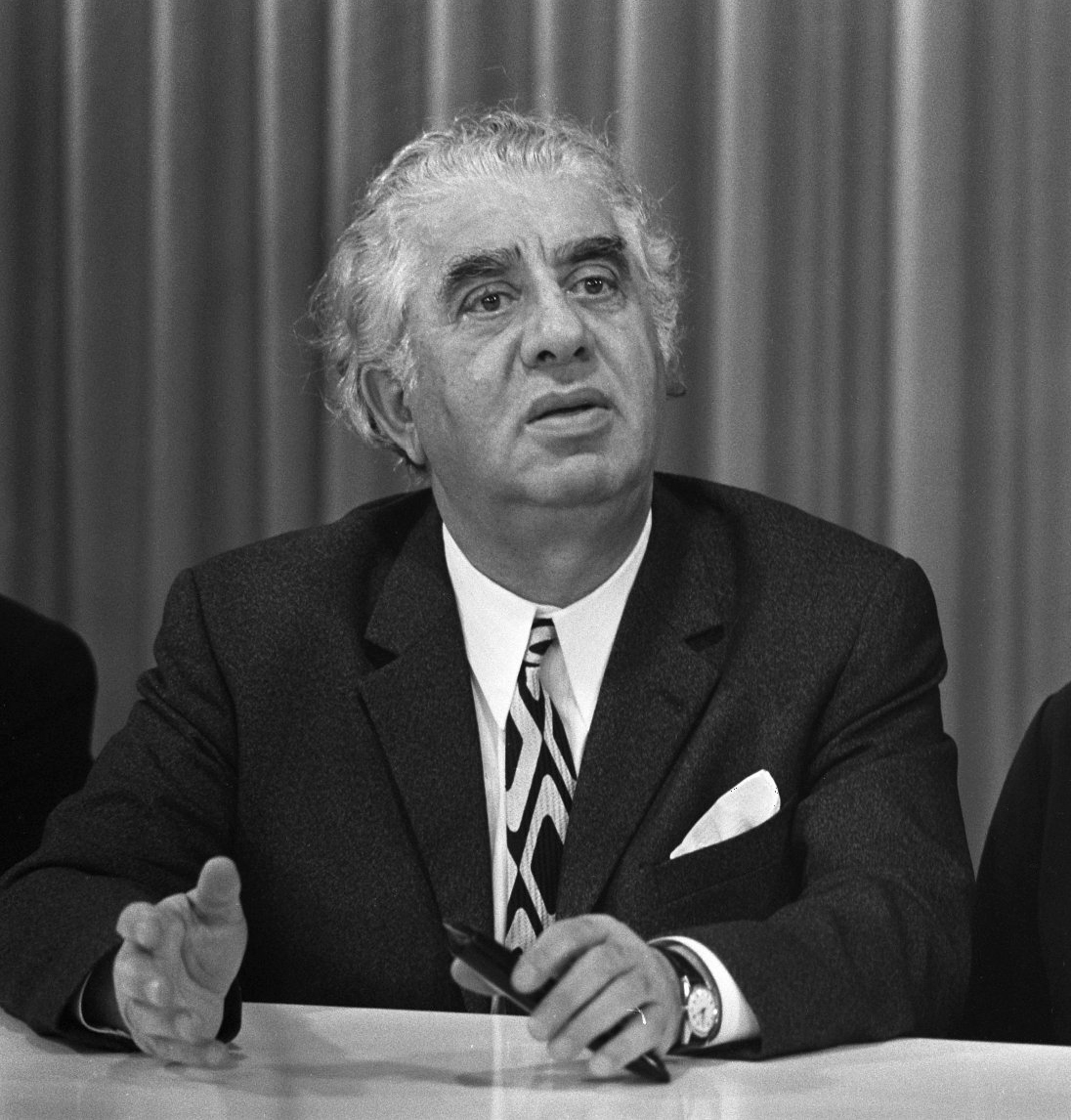
Khachaturian

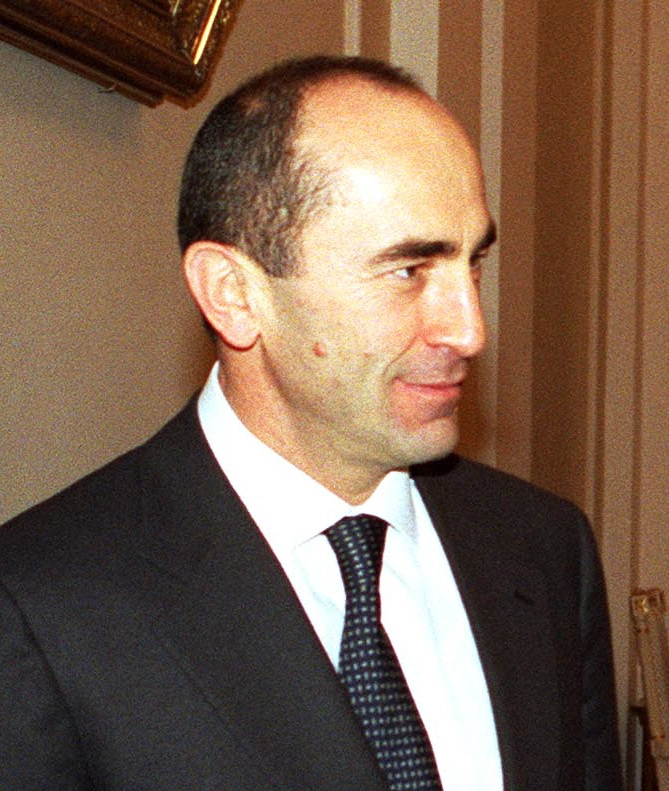
Kocharyan

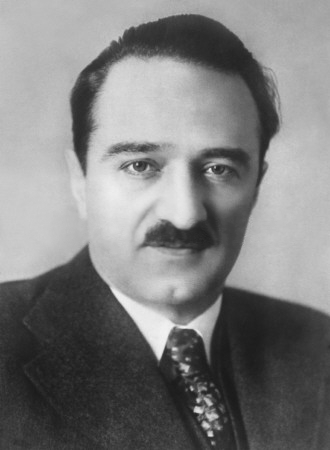
Mikoyan

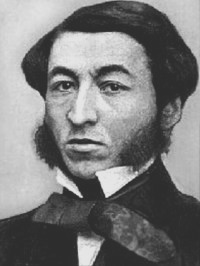
Nalbandian

=== A ===
- Ervand Abrahamian (b. 1940), an Iranian-Armenian historian of Iran. He wrote in the preface of one of his books that, "as far as religious conviction is concerned, [I am] an agnostic on most days - on other days, an atheist."
- Victor Ambartsumian (1908-1996), Soviet Armenian astrophysicist
- Bob Avakian (b. 1943), American communist, chairman of Revolutionary Communist Party, USA. Author of Away With All Gods!.

=== B ===
- Ara Baliozian (1936-2019), Armenian author and critic
- Levon Barseghyan (b. 1967), journalist, editor of Gyumri-based Asparez newspaper
- Peter Boghossian (b. 1966), American philosopher, atheist activist

=== D ===
- Karen Demirchyan (1932-1999), Soviet Armenian leader
- Armen Dzhigarkhanyan (1935-2020), Armenian and Russian (formerly Soviet) film and theater actor and director. He has called himself a "realist" in one interview.

=== G ===
- Kalust Gosdantian (1840-1898), Armenian philosopher
- Levon Grigoryan (b. 1942), Armenian director and screenwriter

=== I ===
- Torgom Isayan (1923-1987), historian of philosophy

=== K ===
- Kamo (1882-1922), Armenian Bolshevik revolutionary
- Ana Kasparian (b. 1986), American political commentator (self-described atheist)
- Madatia Karakashian (1818-1903), Ottoman Armenian historian, former cleric
- Jack Kevorkian (1928-2011), American euthanasia proponent (self-described as agnostic)
- Aram Khachaturian (1903-1978), Soviet Armenian composer (self-described)
- Robert Kocharyan (b. 1954), second President of Armenia (self-described). In his autobiography, Kocharyan wrote that despite having been baptized in 1996, he never became a believer.

=== M ===
- Yervand Manaryan (1924-2020), Armenian actor. Self-described atheist.
- Ned Markosian, American philosopher. Self-described atheist.
- Hrach Martirosyan (b. 1964), Armenian linguist. Self-described atheist.
- Monte Melkonian (1957-1993), Armenian left-wing nationalist revolutionary, militant and commander.
- Anastas Mikoyan (1895-1978), Soviet Armenian revolutionary and statesman. Self-described atheist.
- Edvard Mirzoyan (1921-2012), Armenian composer. Self-described atheist.
- Khachik Momjian (1909-1996), Soviet philosopher
- Armen Movsisyan (b. 1964), Armenian singer-songwriter. Self-described atheist.

=== N ===
- Mikayel Nalbandian (1829-1866), Armenian anti-clerical writer and poet. He was described as an atheist by Soviet-era sources and contemporary clergy such as Gabriel Aivazovsky (1812-1879) Modern scholars describe him as a deist and a liberal Christian.
- Sevan Nişanyan (b. 1956), Turkish-Armenian intellectual and linguist

=== S ===
- Sergey Sargsyan (b. 1982), Armenian comedian
- Ruben Sevak (1886-1915), Armenian writer
- Andy Serkis (b. 1964), English actor
- Marietta Shaginyan (1888-1982), Soviet writer
- Stepan Shaumian (1878-1918), Bolshevik revolutionary

=== T ===
- Nikolay Tsaturyan (b. 1945), Armenian theater director, self-described atheist
- Arsen Torosyan (b. 1982), former Minister of Health of Armenia

== See more ==
- Lists of atheists
- List of atheist Americans
