= Barbara Freitag =

Brazilian sociologist (born 1941)

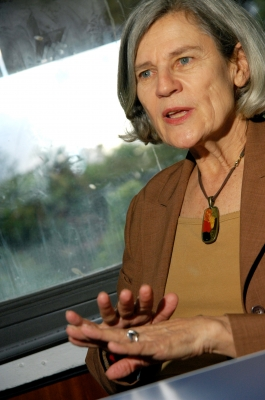
- Born: November 26, 1941 (age 84); Obernzell, Germany
- Citizenship: German
- Occupations: Sociologist, writer, academic
- Spouse: Sérgio Paulo Rouanet

Barbara Freitag-Rouanet (born 26 November 1941, in Obernzell) is a German-born Brazilianist, sociologist, author, and academic at Universidade de Brasília. Her family emigrated to Brazil in 1948 when she was 7.

Graduated in Sociology, Psychology and Philosophy at the Universities of Frankfurt / M. and Berlin. Obtained her PhD at Technische Universität Berlin and pursued her Habilitation at the Free University of Berlin. Taught in these and other European universities. In Brazil, she worked at the University of Brasilia as a tenured professor and received the title of Professor Emeritus. Was also a visiting professor at USP, UNESP, UFPR, UFBa, among others. At UNESCO she occupied the chair entitled "City and Environment". She coordinated an integrated research project that studied the transfer of Brazilian capitals.

She was married to the Brazilian diplomat and writer Sérgio Paulo Rouanet and has a daughter, Adriana Rouanet, who is a cultural producer.

== Published works ==
Books by Barbara Freitag include:

- Die brasilianische Bildungspolitik: Resultante oder Agens gesellschaftl. Wandlungsprozesse? (Beitrage zur Soziologie und Sozialkunde Lateinamerikas) (German Edition) (1975) ISBN 3-7705-1302-9
- Der Aufbau kindlicher Bewusstseinsstrukturen im gesellschaftlichen Kontext: Eine Untersuchung schulpflichtiger Kinder in Brasilien (Beitrage zur Soziologie ... Sozialkunde Lateinamerikas) (German Edition) (1983) ISBN 3-7705-2190-0
- A Teoria Crítica: Ontem e Hoje (Portuguese Edition) (1984) ISBN 85-11-14060-3
- O livro didático em questão (Colecao Educação contemporânea) (Portuguese Edition) (1989) ISBN 85-249-0166-7
- Itinerarios de Antigona: A questão da moralidade (Portuguese Edition) (1992) ISBN 85-308-0184-9
- Sheela-na-gigs: Unravelling an Enigma (2004) ISBN 0-415-34552-9
- Dialogando com Jürgen Habermas (Portuguese Edition) (2005) ISBN 85-282-0132-5
- Teorias da Cidade (2006) ISBN 85-308-0824-X
- Capitais migrantes e Poderes peregrinos: O caso do Rio de Janeiro (Portuguese Edition) (2009) ISBN 978-85-308-0892-1
