= Sérgio Paulo Rouanet =

Brazilian politician (1934–2022)

8th Academic of the 13th chair of the Brazilian Academy of Letters
- In office 11 September 1992 – 3 July 2022
- Preceded by: Francisco de Assis Barbosa
- Succeeded by: Ruy Castro (elect)

Secretary of Culture of the Presidency
- In office 10 March 1991 – 2 October 1992
- President: Fernando Collor
- Preceded by: Ipojuca Pontes
- Succeeded by: Antônio Houaiss

Personal details
- Born: 23 February 1934 Rio de Janeiro, Federal District, Brazil
- Died: 3 July 2022 (aged 88) Rio de Janeiro, Brazil
- Spouse: Barbara Freitag
- Occupation: Diplomat; philosopher; essayist; scholar

Sérgio Paulo Rouanet (23 February 1934 – 3 July 2022) was a Brazilian diplomat, philosopher, essayist, and scholar. He was the national Secretary of Culture between 1991 and 1992, and in his tenure he created the Lei de Incentivo à Cultura (Culture Incentive Law), a tax credit law for companies and citizens that sponsor cultural activities, which became known as Rouanet Law.

Rouanet was a member of the Brazilian Academy of Letters since 1992 to his death.

== Early life and career ==
Born in Rio de Janeiro, he graduated in social sciences at the Pontifical Catholic University of Rio de Janeiro. He got a master's degree in political science from Georgetown University, in economics from George Washington University, philosophy from the New York School for Social Research and also a doctorate from the University of São Paulo.

Rouanet was a general consul of Brazil in Zurich from 1976 to 1982 and Brazilian ambassador in Denmark from 1987 to 1991, when he was appointed by then president Fernando Collor de Mello to occupy the national Secretary of Culture. After Collor de Mello's impeachment, in 1992, Rouanet resigned and was appointed general consul of Brazil in Berlin from 1993 to 1995 and ambassador in Czech Republic from 1995 to 2000.

== Death ==
Rouanet died from Parkinson's disease on 3 July 2022, in Rio de Janeiro.

== Books ==
- O homem é o discurso Arqueologia de Michel Foucault, with José Guilherme Merquior (1971);
- Imaginário e dominação (1978);
- Habermas, with Bárbara Freitag (1980)
- Édipo e o anjo. Itinerários freudianos em Walter Benjamin (1981)
- Teoria crítica e psicanálise (1983)
- A razão cativa. As ilusões da consciência: de Platão a Freud (1985)
- As razões do Iluminismo (1987)
- O espectador noturno. A Revolução Francesa através de Rétif de la Bretonne (1988)
- A coruja e o sambódromo (1988)
- A latinidade como parado (1999)
- A razão nômade: Walter Benjamin e outros viajantes (1994)
- Mal-estar na modernidade (2001)
- Os dez amigos de Freud (2003)
- Idéias: da cultura global à universal (2003)
- Riso e Melancolia (2007)
- Criação no Brasil de uma Escola Superior de Administração Pública (1982)
- Rouanet 80 anos (2016).

Political offices
Preceded by Ipojuca Pontes	Secretary of Culture of the Presidency; 1991–1992	Succeeded by Antônio Houaiss
Academic offices
Preceded by Francisco de Assis Barbosa	8th Academic of the 13th chair of the Brazilian Academy of Letters; 1992–2022	Succeeded by Ruy Castro
