= Ruy Castro =

Brazilian author and journalist

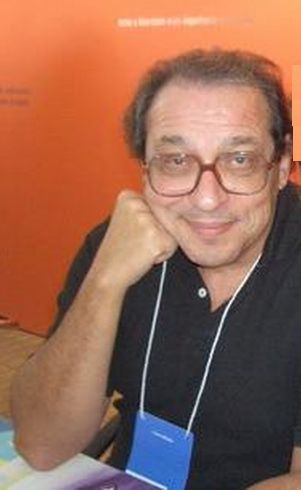
- Ruy Castro: Journalist and Writer
- Born: 26 February 1948 (age 78); Caratinga
- Occupation: Journalist, writer, translator, author
- Spouse(s): Heloísa Seixas
- Awards: Prêmio Machado de Assis (2021)

Ruy Castro (born 26 February 1948, in Caratinga) is a Brazilian author and journalist. In 1996 he was a co-winner of the Prêmio Jabuti. He is known for his writings concerning Bossa nova and for his biographies, profiling figures such as Garrincha, Nelson Rodrigues and Carmen Miranda.

On 6 October 2022 he was elected to occupy the Chair number 13 at the Brazilian Academy of Letters, in succession to Sérgio Paulo Rouanet.

== Published works ==
- Chega de Saudade: A história e as histórias da Bossa Nova - 1990;
- O Anjo Pornográfico: A vida de Nelson Rodrigues - 1992;
- Saudades do Século XX - 1994;
- Estrela Solitária - Um Brasileiro Chamado Garrincha - 1995 (prêmio Jabuti in 1996);
- Ela é Carioca - 1999;
- Bilac Vê Estrelas - 2000;
- O Pai que era Mãe - 2001;
- A Onda que se Ergueu no Mar - 2001;
- Carnaval no Fogo - 2003;
- Flamengo: O Vermelho e o Negro - 2004;
- Amestrando Orgasmos - 2004;
- Carmen - Uma Biografia - 2005 (prêmio Jabuti in 2006);
- Rio Bossa Nova - 2006;
- Tempestade de Ritmos - 2007;
- Era no tempo do rei: Um romance da chegada da corte - 2007;
- Terramarear (co-authored with Heloísa Seixas) - 2011;
- Morrer de Prazer - Crônicas da Vida por um Fio - 2013;
- Letra e música - 2013
- A noite do meu bem - a história e as histórias do Samba-Canção - 2015

=== Adaptations and anthologies ===
- Mau-Humor: Uma antologia definitiva de citações venenosas;
- Contos de Estimação;
- Querido Poeta: Correspondência de Vinicius de Moraes.
