= Pietro Acciarito =

Italian anarchist (1871–1943)

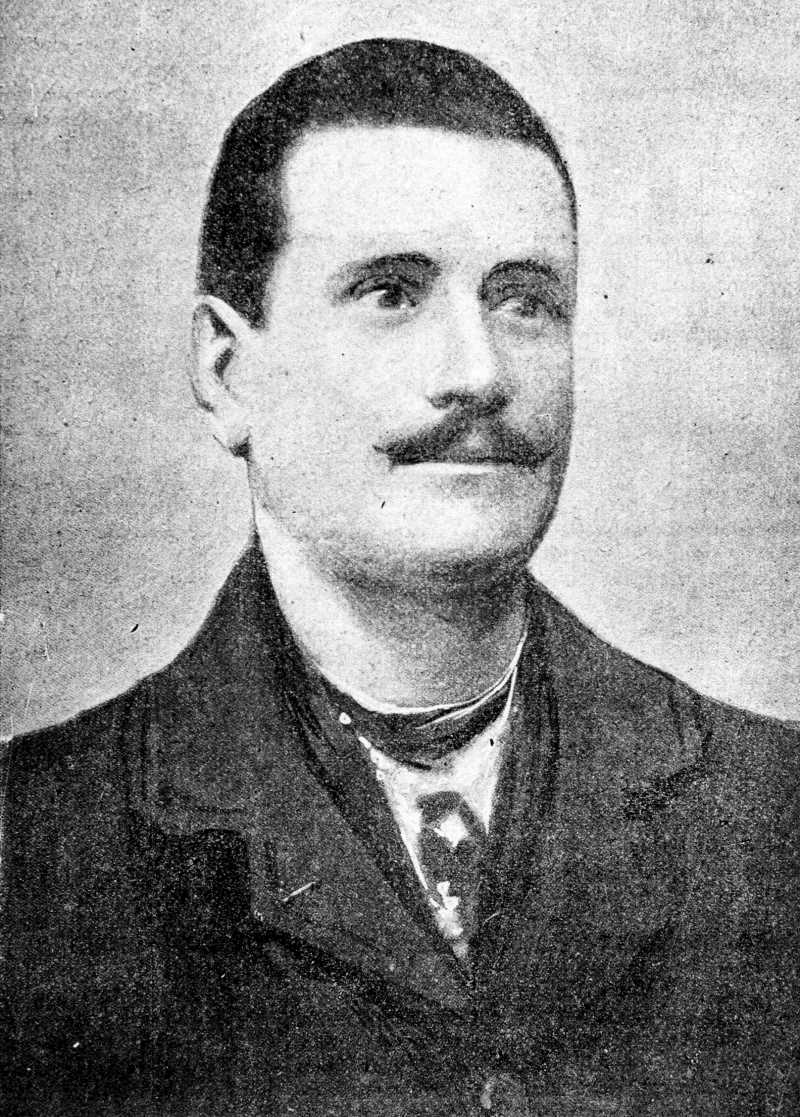
- Born: 27 June 1871; Artena, Italy
- Died: 4 December 1943 (aged 72); Italy
- Occupation: Blacksmith
- Status: Deceased
- Conviction: Attempted Murder of Umberto I
- Penalty: Life imprisonment

Pietro Umberto Acciarito (27 June 1871 – 4 December 1943) was an Italian anarchist who at the age of 25 attempted to assassinate the then king of Italy, Umberto I.

== Early life ==
Acciarito was born in Artena, where his family had settled a decade before his birth. His parents were Camillo Acciarito, and Anna Jossi. His family lived in poverty, partly as a result of Rome’s housing construction boom in the 1880s, which the Italian government made little effort to alleviate.

In 1895, Acciarito found employment as a blacksmith with the Bank of Naples. However, he was dismissed due to disputes over unpaid wages. He later attempted to establish his own business, but the depressed economy of the period limited its success. Acciarito frequently dealt with suicidal thoughts which were exasperated by his inability to marry his lover Pasqua Venaruba, whom he met in the summer of 1886. He disclosed to his friends that if were to commit suicide he would do so in a way which would send a message to the Italian government: "the government must provide for the poor people".

== Assassination attempt ==
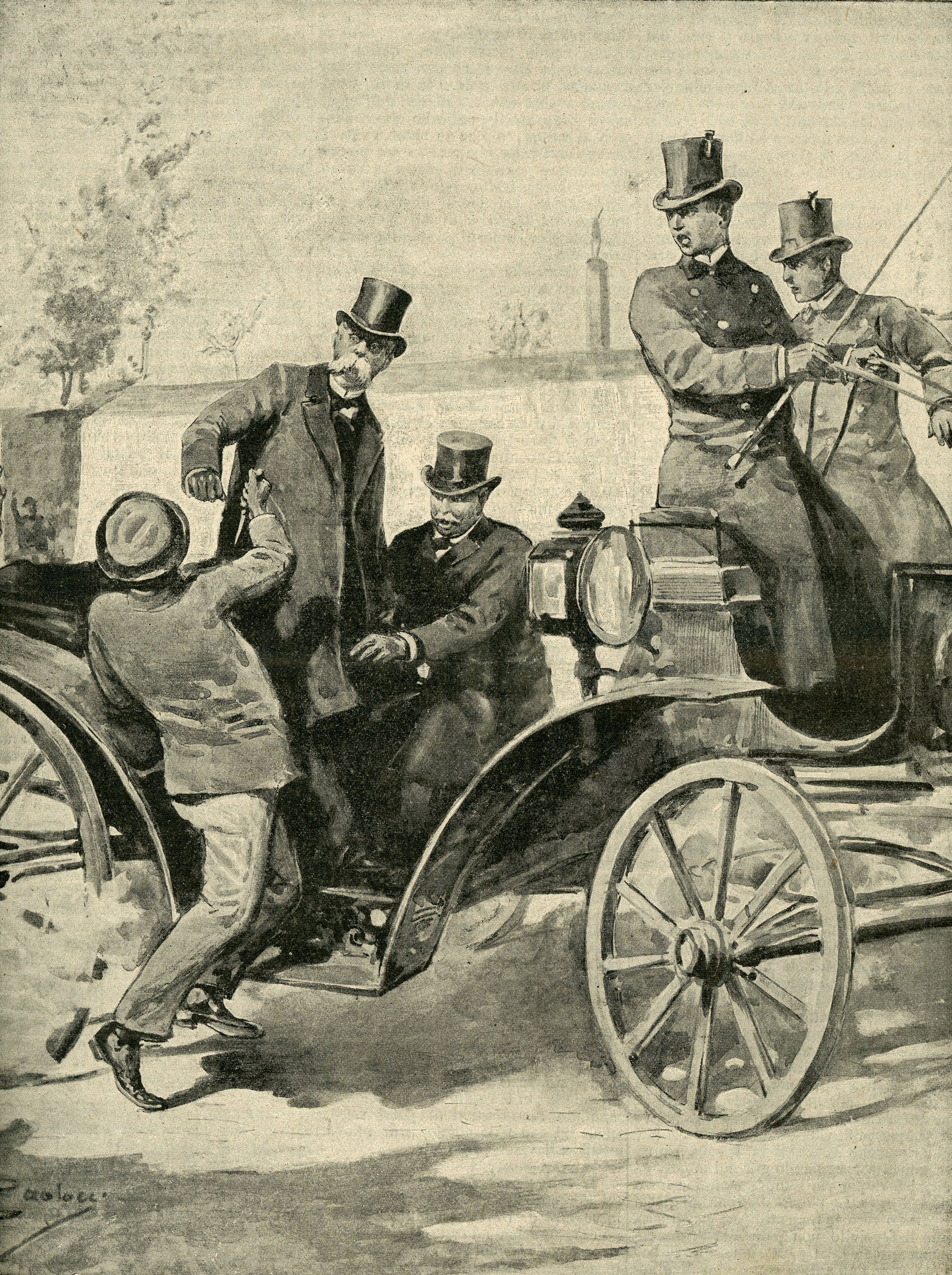
Depiction of the assassination

As Acciarito's anger and disillusionment grew, reports of him muttering to himself, intending to kill either himself or someone of status soon emerged. His father became worried and reported Acciarito to the police. The police were unable to locate him so the Police Chief of Rome, Ernesto Martelli, informed all those concerned with the King's safety to be on high alert.

On 20 April 1897, he closed his workshop permanently and visited his father announcing that it was the last time they would see each other. Acciarito soon learned of the king's appearance at the derby horse Capannelle track outside of Rome on 22 April 1897. Aware that Umberto was travelling along the Via Appia Nuova, Acciarito waited for him near the Porta San Giovanni, armed only with a homemade dagger. The royal carriage arrived at 14:00, at which point Acciarito attacked the carriage and attempted to murder the king, although he failed and was subsequently detained.

=== Aftermath ===
After the attempted assassination, anarchists and socialists were routinely harassed and arrested, particularly those in the Esquilino district, the arrests included the staff of the L'Agitazione (the turmoil), Acciarito's friends who were deemed, accomplices along with a man named Romeo Frezzi who possessed a photo including Acciarito which was used as evidence for his and the other men in the photo's involvement. Frezzi was soon found dead after his arrest, which the police claimed was either a suicide or brain aneurysm, however, evidence found in the autopsy report showed he was certainly beaten to death by prison guards. Frezzi soon became mystified and used as a symbol of an oppressive regime prosecuting and abusing innocents and protests soon erupted all throughout Italy. Despite claims by the police there was no proof of Acciarto having any associates or any connection to anarchists whatsoever. Legalisation was then proposed to clamp down on the press with greater censorship and prevent the election of democrats and socialists.

Acciarito's trial took place on 28–29 May 1897, at the Rome Court of Assize. Chief prosecutor Eugenio Forni hoped to establish a connection between the attack and the anarchist movement although Acciarito denied such a connection existing, never referring to anarchist principles, ideas or even identifying as one. Acciarito was found guilty and sentenced to life in prison, with the first seven years spent in solitary confinement in chains and provided with a diet which could barely sustain life. Acciarito seemed unfazed, with him commenting "Very well, me today, tomorrow the bourgeois government. Long live the social revolution!. Long Live Anarchy!".

== Life in prison, second trial and death ==
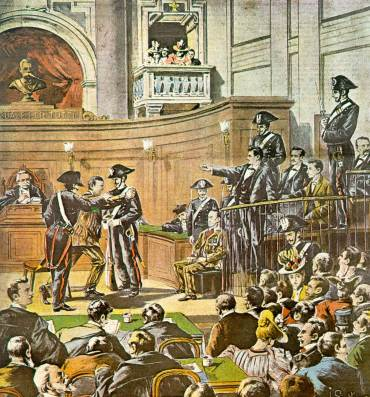
Acciarito's trial according to the Roman weekly La Tribuna Illustrata of 9 June 1899

Despite absolute proof of no connection to anarchism or others involved, the state still claimed otherwise saying that the anarchist socialist party based in Ancona were responsible. The government tried to coerce him into confessing the identity of assumed associates such as informing Acciarito of his friend's arrest and placing a fellow prisoner into the adjacent cell posing as an anarchist hoping to gain Acciarito's trust. When these proved to be fruitless they convinced a new plan amounting to psychological torture-convince Acciarito that his girlfriend had given birth to a son. Acciarito quickly become obsessed with this hypothetical child and feared he would be killed unless Acciarito collaborated and named associates. Acciartito quickly requested to write to his son, which was then used against him as prison officials drafted a false letter imitating the nonexistent child in the hope of Acciartito confessing in order to secure a pardon.

On 2 December 1898, he signed a petition requesting pardon. Weeks later once it became clear that this was to no avail he signed a second petition this time naming supposed associates "Collabona, Gudini and Trenta". Collabona and Gudini pleaded their innocence, stating their only involvement was searching for him on 22 April to notify him of the police's search. He would later apologise to both for implicating them, believing it to be necessary for a pardon. At the hearing of his pardon, Acciarito was informed that the son he believed to exist, was instead a fabrication. Acciarito, devastated, then placed into evidence the letters he had supposedly received from his son. The defence attorneys questioned as to why such flagrant abuse could knowingly happen to which the prison officials replied that they believed it was in the best interest of the state. On 3 July 1899, the trial was suspended, however, it quickly resumed to which Acciarito discredited his past testimonies restating that he was the only perpetrator. On 5 April 1900, he was acquitted of all charges, however, a pardon was never granted. Acciarito would spend the rest of his life in prison and a mental asylum upon being diagnosed as insane.

He died in prison at the age of 72 in Italy.

== Legacy ==
Acciarito is one of a long line of Italian anarchist attempted assassins, including Gaetano Bresci's successful assassination of Umberto I, Michele Angiolillo's assassination of Antonio Cánovas del Castillo, Sante Geronimo Caserio's assassination of Marie François Sadi Carnot, among many others.

== Bibliography ==
- Pernicone, Nunzio (2011). "The Case of Pietro Acciarito: Accomplices, Psychological Torture, and "Raison d'État"". Journal for the Study of Radicalism. 5 (1): 67–104. JSTOR 41889948.
