= List of atheists (surnames E to G) =

Name	Dates	Known as / for	Who	Reference
Christopher Eccleston	1964–	English stage, film, and television actor, known for his roles in Shallow Grave, 28 Days Later, and as the ninth incarnation of the Doctor in Doctor Who.		"I'm an atheist. My mother is very religious, a churchgoer. She would often encourage me to go to church as well, but never forced it upon me, which I thought was quite decent of her. [...] There was no defining moment in which I decided there was no god for me, it was more of a growing process. I do feel that whatever religious beliefs I had as a child were foisted upon me. It's like when you ask where Grandma went when she died, and you'd be told that she went to heaven. I wouldn't necessarily view that as a bad thing, but it was stuff like that which I think hindered my intellectual development. Now that I've grown, I prefer a different interpretation."
David Edgar	1948–	British playwright, noted for his adaptation of Charles Dickens' novel Nicholas Nickleby.		"Earlier this year David Edgar wrote an unforgettable account of the death of his wife, Eve Cook, for a BBC radio talk during Easter week. An avowed atheist, Edgar said that he was trying to express 'that most human need to tell the dead what we would want to say - but know we couldn't say - if they were still alive'."
Paul Edwards	1923–2004	Austrian-American moral philosopher and editor of The Encyclopedia of Philosophy		"'There is no God, there is no life after death, Jesus was a man, and, perhaps most important, the influence of religion is by and large bad,' he wrote in the current issue of Free Inquiry, a magazine about secular humanism, a school of thought that emphasizes values based on experience rather than religion.".
Fan Zhen	450–515	Chinese philosopher		
Jodie Foster	1962–	Actress	American film actress, director, and producer.	
Joseph Fouché	1759–1820	French statesman and Minister of Police under Napoleon I.		Helped established the Cult of Reason. Established the policy of inscribing "Death is an eternal sleep" over the gates to cemeteries.
Sigmund Freud	1856–1939	Austrian neurologist, "father of psychoanalysis"		"The man who would become an atheist..."
Stephen Fry	1957–	British author, comedian, television presenter, actor, journalist, film director, broadcaster and political activist		"The most important philosophy I think is that even if it isn't true you must absolutely assume there is no afterlife. You cannot for one second I think, abrogate the responsibility of believing that this is it because if you think you’re going to have an eternity in which you can talk to Mozart and Chopin and Schopenhauer on a cloud and learn stuff and you know really get to grips with knowledge and understanding and so you won’t bother now. I think it’s a terrible, a terrible mistake."
Anu Garg	1967–	Author	American author, speaker, engineer, and founder of Wordsmith.org.	
Gao Xingjian	1940–	Author	Chinese émigré novelist, dramatist, critic, translator, stage director and painter. Winner of the Nobel Prize in Literature in 2000.	"Putting aside discussion of the existence or non-existence of God, I would like to say that despite my being an atheist I have always shown reverence for the unknowable."
Theo van Gogh	1957–2004	Film director	Dutch film director, television producer, publicist and actor, murdered following the broadcasting of his film Submission.	"This book is called "Allah knows best" because it is my dark suspicion we are on the verge of the new Middle Ages of Mecca; and because I feel, as a professional atheist, very unsafe in a climate that is dominated by ambitious mayors who are happily busy "keeping things together". Since 11 September, the knives are sharpened and the fifth column of goatfuckers marches ahead unhindered."
Ricky Gervais	1961–	Actor	English comedian, actor, director, producer, musician, writer, and former radio presenter.	"I'm basically a 'do unto others' type person. I don't have any religious feelings because I'm an atheist, but I live my life like there's a God. And if there was he'd probably love me."
Shenae Grimes	1989–	Canadian actress	Annie Wilson on 90210, Darcy Edwards on Degrassi: The Next Generation.	
Herb Grosch	1918–2010	Computer scientist	Grosch's law	
Brion Gysin	1916–1986	Painter, writer, sound poet, and performance artist	He is best known for his discovery of the cut-up technique.	
