= Carmen – Uma biografia =

2005 biography of Carmen Miranda by Ruy Castro

- Author: Ruy Castro
- Language: Portugues
- Subject: Carmen Miranda
- Genre: Biography
- Publisher: Companhia das Letras
- Publication date: December 2005
- Publication place: Brazil
- Media type: Print (hardcover)
- Pages: 632
- ISBN: 978-85-3590-760-5

Carmen – Uma biografia (English: Carmen – A Biography) is a 2005 biographical book written by Ruy Castro. Published in the year 2005 by Companhia das Letras, the book treats on the main events Carmen Miranda's life, from her rise as a radio singer in the 1930s in Brazil, through the peak period of her career as a Hollywood actress and singer of Broadway to the process of her decline and death.

== Summary ==
Year after year, the journalist Ruy Castro follows the lives of Carmen Miranda, "the most famous Brazilian 20th century", of her birth in a village in Portugal and the arrival in Rio de Janeiro in 1909, with ten months old, and yours recognition Brazilian and international. The work recounts the meteoric rise of Miranda, comes to her problems with stimulants, sleeping pills, alcohol, and deals with the intimacy of sexual relations of the star. A revealing book, which shows that behind the joy of the artist, there were a real woman.

Carmen is the largest biography of an artist ever published in Brazil. The journalist writes in the book that the superficial idea of the stereotype perpetuated by Carmen Miranda would have been an imposition of Hollywood. The films featuring the singer are usually associated with "the Good Neighbor Policy" cultural outreach strategy (for commercial purposes) US with Latin America devised by Nelson Rockefeller and supported by President Franklin D. Roosevelt. According to Castro, "they may even have contributed to the plan, but did not start because of it."

== Development ==
Ruy Castro spent about five years researching the life of the artist, using as source the intersection of dozens of interviews with research in newspapers and personal files.

== Awards ==
2006 — 48th Prêmio Jabuti

- Best Biographical Book (won)
- Best Non-fiction Book (won)

== Version for television ==
The rights to the biography were later sold to Rede Globo, which idealized make a miniseries about Carmen Miranda, the Globo however bumped into several demands made by the family of the singer. Furthermore, issues in the Brazilian courts have delayed the project (producer Paula Lavigne bought in 1998 Carmen's image rights for $200,000, to make a movie about her life.) The idea of the miniseries was director Carlos Manga, which invited the writer Maria Adelaide Amaral to take the script the plot.

On 27 December 2015, the Folha de S.Paulo newspaper announced that in 2016 the network has plans to resume negotiations with Carmen Miranda's family to get permission to bring his story to TV.
