= List of atheists (surnames H to K) =

Name	Dates	Known as / for	Who	Reference
Kamal Haasan	1954–	Actor, Director, Lyricist, Producer, screenwriter, playback singer,	Leading Tamil Film Actor	"I don't need a God who doesn't feed a hungry child today, but promises you a heaven tomorrow."
Boris Van der Ham	1973–	Dutch humanist, actor, writer and politician	Known humanist	In his time as a Member of Parliament, Mr. Van der Ham has drafted the bill that abolished the ban on blasphemy in the Dutch law. As president of the Dutch Humanist Association he worked on two documentaries on ex-muslims, and co-wrote a book on former Dutch muslims who are now called 'new freethinkers'. He is treasure of Humanists International.
Guy Harrison	1963–	Author		“If a beautiful sunflower is somehow supposed to be evidence of the Christian god, then what is a parasitic worm that eats children’s eyeballs evidence of?” From the book, "50 Simple Questions for Every Christian"
Amber Heard	1986–	Actress and model		At the age of 16, her best friend died in a car crash and Heard, who was raised Catholic, subsequently declared herself an atheist.
Christopher Hitchens	1949–2011	Author/Activist		
George Holyoake	1817–1906	English Secularist	Coined terms "Secularism" and "Jingoism"	Last person in England to be imprisoned for being an atheist
George Hrab	1971–	Musician, podcaster	Independent recording artist, host of Geologic Podcast	"George Hrab is an atheist in the Christmas City, a performer more famous globally than in his hometown and his "day job" is drumming for a funk band."
Jamie Hyneman	1956–	Special-Effects Expert, Television Personality	Co-star of the Discovery's Mythbusters	"[A]ctually I'm pretty adamant about, you know, the whole God thing and it seems that skeptics are by and large atheists or something approaching that, which I strongly identify with. So it turned out to be a good thing and I have become enthusiastically part of it."
Eddie Izzard	1962–	Performer, Stand-Up Comedian	Best known for stand-up set Dress to Kill, his starring role in the television series The Riches and many motion pictures such as Ocean's Twelve, Mystery Men, and Across the Universe.	
Penn Jillette	1955–	Magician		“Believing there is no God gives me more room for belief in family, people, love, truth, beauty, sex, Jell-O and all the other things I can prove and that make this life the best life I will ever have"
Kerry King	1964–	Musician	Lead/Rhythm Guitarist of Slayer	"I'm an atheist but I don't fuck with people believing in it."
Stanley Kubrick	1928–1999	Film director, screenwriter, producer, cinematographer and editor	Renowned American director whose films include 2001: A Space Odyssey, A Clockwork Orange and The Shining	"The whole idea of god is absurd. If anything, 2001 shows that what some people call "god" is simply an acceptable term for their ignorance. What they don't understand, they call "god"... Everything we know about the universe reveals that there is no god. I chose to do Dr. [Arthur C.] Clarke's story as a film because it highlights a critical factor necessary for human evolution; that is, beyond our present condition. This film is a rejection of the notion that there is a god; isn't that obvious?"
