= List of atheists (surnames N to Q) =

Atheists with surnames starting N, O, P and Q, sortable by the field for which they are mainly known and nationality.

Simon Napier-Bell	1939–	Musician	British (English) music producer, songwriter, journalist and author, best known as manager of (among others) The Yardbirds, Marc Bolan, T. Rex and Wham!.	"Bob was arguing the point but Dick was having none of it. 'Look, I'm telling you. There'll be no fucking religion – not Christian, not Jewish, not Muslim. Nothing. For God's sake, man – you were born Jewish, which makes your religion money, doesn't it? So stick with it, for Christ's sake. I'm giving you 20 million bucks – it's like baptising you, like sending you to heaven. So what are you fucking moaning about? You want 20 million bucks from us? Well, you gotta do what we tell you. And what we're telling you is... No Torah! No Bible! No Koran! No Jesus! No God! No Allah! No fucking religion. It's going in the contract.' As a devout atheist, I could hardly object, though it seemed tough that a contract should include such specific restrictions."
Taslima Nasrin	1962–	Activist	Bangladeshi physician, writer, feminist human rights activist and secular humanist.	"I was born in a Muslim family, but I became an atheist."
Jawaharlal Nehru	1889–1964	Politician	Indian prime minister (1947–1964).	Nehru says that he does not believe in a god in any form. (see sources)
Aziz Nesin	1915–1995	Author	Turkish humorist and author of more than 100 books.	"He [Salman Rushdie] emphasised that the direct cause of the riot seemed to be a speech by Nesin, rather than The Satanic Verses. "I'm damned if I'm going to carry the can for this one," he said. Versions of the speech that Nesin delivered differ, but all agree that he said he was an atheist, that religion should be adapted to modern times and that there was no reason to obey books written hundreds of years ago, including the Koran."
Franz Leopold Neumann	1900–1954	Political scientist	German political scientist, known for theoretical analyses of National Socialism, and considered among the founders of modern political science in Germany.	
Michael Neumann	1946–	Philosopher	American professor of philosophy at Trent University, noted for his work on utilitarianism, rationality and antisemitism.	
Michael Newdow	1953–	Atheist activist	American physician and attorney.	Sued a school district on the grounds that its requirement that children recite the U.S. Pledge of Allegiance, containing the words "under God", breached the separation-of-church-and-state provision in the establishment clause of the United States Constitution.
Ingrid Newkirk	1949–	Activist	British (English born) animal rights activist, author, and president and co-founder of People for the Ethical Treatment of Animals, the world's largest animal rights organization.	"I do have a personal philosophy. I'm an atheist."
Kai Nielsen	1926–2021	Philosopher	Canadian adjunct professor of philosophy at Concordia University in Montreal and professor emeritus of philosophy at the University of Calgary.	"Since my mid-undergraduate days, I have been an atheist. By now I suppose there are some who would call me a professional atheist troikaing me with Antony Flew and Michael Scriven."
Oscar Niemeyer	1907–2012	Architect	Brazilian architect, considered one of the most important names in international modern architecture.	"Niemeyer turns up the volume on architecture to make the hairs stand up on the back of your neck. In 1987, when I first visited Brasilia and walked into the cathedral, it was a revelation. Stepping from the sunlight into the dimly lit nave and out again into the glorious light-filled, blue-glazed cathedral, alive with doves and angels, was exhilarating, an electrifying play upon light and shade. "Earth meets space. The nave opens up to infinity," Niemeyer explains. So what if he is an atheist?"
Friedrich Nietzsche	1844–1900	Philosopher	German philosopher whose Beyond Good and Evil sought to refute traditional notions of morality.	Nietzsche penned a memorable secular statement of the Doctrine of Eternal Recurrence in Thus Spoke Zarathustra and is forever associated with the phrase, "God is dead" (first seen in his book, The Gay Science).
Michael Nugent	1961–	Writer and activist	Irish writer and activist, chairperson of Atheist Ireland.	"As far back as I can remember, I have been an atheist. I probably stopped believing in God around the same time – and for the same reasons – as I stopped believing in Santa Claus. It seemed to me to be just another fictional story. Atheist Ireland stands for two things. The first is promoting atheism and reason over superstition and supernaturalism, and the second is promoting an ethical and secular Ireland in which the state doesn't fund or favour any particular religion."
Paul Nurse	1949–	Scientist	British (English) winner of the 2001 Nobel Laureate in Physiology or Medicine.	"I gradually slipped away from religion over several years and became an atheist or to be more philosophically correct, a sceptical agnostic."
Dara Ó Briain	1972–	Comedian	Irish comedian and television presenter.	Describes himself as an atheist, but "ethnically Catholic" for comic effect. "I'm staunchly atheist, I simply don't believe in God. But I'm still Catholic, of course. Catholicism has a much broader reach than just the religion. I'm ethnically Catholic, it's the box you have to tick on the census form: ‘Don’t believe in God, but I do still hate the Rangers.'"
Martin O'Hagan	1950–2001	Journalist	British (Northern Irish) journalist, the most prominent journalist to be assassinated during the Troubles.	"Marty really rattled the paramilitaries because he had such good contacts," said John Keane, a friend and colleague of O'Hagan's. "He'd be able to tell you what they had for breakfast before they went out to kill. He had a cynical eye and he was very aware of the sub-structure of society, the unusual alliances, the way people weren't always what they seemed. He was an atheist and a Marxist, liable to start spouting Hegel if you gave him a chance. He used to say, my enemy's enemy is my friend. Very little that happened in Northern Ireland would have surprised Marty."
Madalyn Murray O'Hair	1919–1995	Atheist activist	American founder of American Atheists, campaigner for the separation of church and state	Filed the lawsuit that led the US Supreme Court to ban teacher-led prayer and Bible reading in public schools.
Redmond O'Hanlon	1947–	Author	British author, a Fellow of the Royal Society of Literature.	"He had been very religious as a boy – 'You have to be to survive being brought up in a vicarage' – but he became, on discovering Darwin at 14, not merely an agnostic, but a militant atheist, much to his father's distress. They still don't talk about it. His mother, he says, is also very religious but in an emotional way: 'She believes that in heaven she will be reunited with every spaniel she has ever owned.' While O'Hanlon was away in Africa, his older brother, a book rep, took Belinda and the children to communion. O'Hanlon was shocked, but 'I decided not to be angry about it. A real atheist, you see, is not exercised about it.' "
Joyce Carol Oates	1938–	Author	American author and Professor of Creative Writing at Princeton University.	Q: "I noticed that nobody uses the "A-word"—atheist—for you. Perhaps it is a step beyond nontheist or humanist. Do you identify as an atheist? Oates: "That's a good question. I have met Christopher Hitchens once or twice, and he has a book that I'm sure you've either read or are aware of titled God is Not Great: How Religion Poisons Everything. He is very adversarial, very eloquent, and very funny in his interviews. And, of course, he is very much a self-declared atheist. "I'm not averse to acknowledging it, but as a novelist and a writer, I really don't want to confront and be antagonistic toward people. As soon as you declare that you are an atheist, it's like somebody declaring that he is the son of God; it arouses a lot antagonism. I'm wondering whether it might be better to avoid arousing this antagonism in order to find—not compromise—some common ground."
Barack Obama, Sr.	1936–1982	Economist	Kenyan senior economist for his government, ex-Muslim, and father of United States President Barack Obama.	"My father was almost entirely absent from my childhood, having been divorced from my mother when I was 2 years old; in any event, although my father had been raised a Muslim, by the time he met my mother he was a confirmed atheist, thinking religion to be so much superstition."
Piergiorgio Odifreddi	1950–	Philosopher	Italian mathematician, philosopher and science writer.	see source
Culbert Olson	1876–1962	Politician	American politician and Governor of California (1939–1943).	(see source)
Bree Olson	1986–	Pornographic actress	American pornographic actress and Penthouse Pet.	"I'm atheist [sic]. I know that when you die, there's no heaven, so that really bums me out. I wish I could be Christian and say I'm going to heaven but I know I'm not. It sucks to know the truth."
Michel Onfray	1959–	Philosopher	French philosopher, founder of Université populaire de Caen and author.	Author of Atheist Manifesto: The Case Against Christianity, Judaism, and Islam.
Graham Oppy	1960–	Philosopher	Australian philosopher and Associate Dean of Research at Monash University, and Associate Editor of the Australasian Journal of Philosophy. His main area of research is the philosophy of religion.	In Is God Good By Definition Oppy presented a logical argument for God's nonexistence based upon an alleged fact of metaethics: the falsity of moral realism. If moral realism is false, then that is a fact that is incompatible with God's existence.
Deborah Orr	1962–2019	Journalist	British journalist and broadcaster, married to writer and satirist Will Self.	"As a fully paid-up atheist, I need no persuasion that God is neither great nor real. But, at times, as I hear for the umpteenth time the assertion that religion is the cause of all human strife, I start to find myself thinking that blaming religion for war is like blaming coloured bibs for school netball. The belief that religion is the root of all human evil is as blinkered and simplistic as the most unquestioning faith of religious adherents."
George Orwell	1903–1950	Author	British (English) writer and journalist, a novelist, critic, and commentator on politics and culture, one of the most admired English-language essayists of the twentieth century, and most famous for two novels critical of totalitarianism in general (Nineteen Eighty-Four), and Stalinism in particular (Animal Farm).	"Again, Astor took care of arrangements. Orwell, the atheist, had requested that he be buried according to the rites of the Church of England. Astor found a plot in the churchyard in Sutton Courtenay, Oxfordshire." "Both Orwell, the avowed atheist, and Waugh, the Catholic convert, railed against moral relativism."
John Oswald	1760–1793	Author	British (Scottish) journalist, poet, social critic and revolutionary.	"Oswald, a vegetarian and atheist, used the pseudonyms Ignotus (in the Political Herald, 1785–7), Sylvester Otway (London newspapers 1788–9), and H. K.
Patton Oswalt	1969–	Comedian and actor	American actor and comedian.	In his December 2004 Comedy Central stand-up special, No Reason to Complain, Oswalt said he was a "stone cold atheist." In his 2004 comedy album, Feelin' Kind of Patton, Oswalt hypothesizes what might happen during the Apocalypse: "I'm wrong and there is a God." Oswalt has referenced his atheism in his 2009 special, My Weakness is Strong, and by Katt Williams in the opening act of The Comedy Central Roast of Flavor Flav.
Jorge Oteiza	1908–2003	Artist	Basque sculptor, painter, designer and writer, renowned for being one of the main theorists on Basque modern art.	"A profound spirituality informs most of Oteiza's work. He could articulate a humanistic form of Christianity or, with equal lucidity, proclaim himself "a devout atheist"."
Camille Paglia	1947–	Author	American post-feminist literary and cultural critic.	(see source)
Tony Parker	1923–1996	Historian	British (English) oral historian, whose work was dedicated to giving a voice to British and American society's most marginalised figures.	"The oral historian Tony Parker, who has died aged 73, was an atheist. "If it turns out I'm wrong and I find myself in front of God, I shan't half have a lot to say on the subject." One reason Tony will have so much to say in heaven is because he spent so much of his time on earth being totally silent."
Bruce Parry	1969–	Television personality	British (English) former Royal Marine instructor who presents the BBC / Discovery Channel documentary Tribe.	"Newly tolerant Parry is a "post-Deist" – "basically I'm an atheist but reluctant to admit it."
Andy Partridge	1953–	Musician	British (English) guitarist for rock band XTC.	"...I don't believe in God..." "Basically I don't believe in God." From an interview with Partridge in The Limelight Annual, 1987
Frances Partridge	1900–2004	Author	British (English) member of the Bloomsbury Group and a writer, probably best known for the publication of her diaries.	"Frances Partidge was a pacifist long before she met Ralph. She says she cannot pinpoint the day with the same clarity with which she can remember discovering herself an atheist—at the age of 11 in an Isle of Wight boarding house—but hearing about the outbreak of World War I in the company of bellicose friends, and a feminist cousin who supported conscientious objectors, put her on the path."
Julia Pascal	1949–	Playwright	British Jewish playwright and theatre director.	"Islam as we are experiencing it in the west at the moment is having difficulties examining areas of criticism. All religions should face criticism. As an atheist, I believe it is a healthy society that does criticise religions. What happened to Salman Rushdie was absolutely shameful. It takes us back to the middle ages."
Pier Paolo Pasolini	1922–1975	Author	Italian poet, intellectual, film director, and writer.	"Not since 1964 had Pasolini created such a stir, and even then it was not the content of his The Gospel According to St. Matthew that stunned people. It was the discovery that a director who was both a communist and an atheist could bring such fervor and insight to a religious subject. [...] There are times when Pasolini sounds remarkably religious for a self-acknowledged atheist. "I suffer from the nostalgia of a peasant-type religion, and that is why I am on the side of the servant," he says. "But I do not believe in a metaphysical god. I am religious because I have a natural identification between reality and God. Reality is divine. That is why my films are never naturalistic. The motivation that unites all of my films is to give back to reality its original sacred significance."
Linus Pauling	1901–1994	Scientist	American chemist, Nobel Laureate in Chemistry (1954) and Peace (1962)	"... I [Pauling] am not, however, militant in my atheism. The great English theoretical physicist Paul Dirac is a militant atheist. I suppose he is interested in arguing about the existence of God. I am not. It was once quipped that there is no God and Dirac is his prophet." Werner Heisenberg recollects a friendly conversation among young participants at the 1927 Solvay Conference about Einstein's and Planck's views on religion. Wolfgang Pauli, Heisenberg and Dirac took part in it. Among other things, Dirac said: "I cannot understand why we idle discussing religion. If we are honest — and as scientists honesty is our precise duty — we cannot help but admit that any religion is a pack of false statements, deprived of any real foundation. The very idea of God is a product of human imagination.[...] I do not recognize any religious myth, at least because they contradict one another.[...]" Pauli jokingly said: "Well, I'd say that also our friend Dirac has got a religion and the first commandment of this religion is: God does not exist and Paul Dirac is his prophet."
John Allen Paulos	1945–	Scientist	American writer and Professor of mathematics at Temple University in Philadelphia.	Author of Irreligion: A Mathematician Explains Why the Arguments for God Just Don't Add Up (2007)
Philip K. Paulson	1947–2006	Atheist activist	American plaintiff in a series of lawsuits to remove a Christian cross from a prominent summit in the city of San Diego.	"The real message is equal treatment under the law, and religious neutrality. That's the purpose of why I did it. It has nothing to do with me being an atheist. The fact is, the Constitution calls for no preference and that's why every judge ruled for me."
Ivan Pavlov	1849–1936	Scientist	Russian Nobel Prize winning physiologist, psychologist, and physician; widely known for first describing the phenomenon of classical conditioning.	Asked by his follower E. M. Kreps whether or not he was religious, Kreps wrote that Pavlov smiled and replied: "Listen, good fellow, in regard to [claims of] my religiosity, my belief in God, my church attendance, there is no truth in it; it is sheer fantasy. I was a seminarian, and like the majority of seminarians, I became an unbeliever, an atheist in my school years."
Leonard Peikoff	1933–	Philosopher	Canadian Objectivist philosopher, he is Ayn Rand's intellectual and legal heir. He is a former professor of philosophy, a former radio talk show host, and founder of the Ayn Rand Institute.	"...as an Objectivist I am an atheist."
Edmund Penning-Rowsell	1913–2002	Journalist	British wine writer, considered the foremost of his generation.	"Penning-Rowsell and his sister were born Roman Catholic, but he was, if anything, an atheist. He was at Marlborough at the same time as John Betjeman, where his disposition to dissent first showed itself when he was the only boy to refuse to join the Corps."
Calel Perechodnik	1916–1944	Author	Polish Jewish diarist and Jewish Ghetto policeman at the Warsaw Ghetto.	see source
Francis Perrin	1901–1992	Scientist	French physicist, co-establisher the possibility of nuclear chain reactions and nuclear energy production.	"After retirement, he remained politically active, defending Andrei Sakharov, and was President of the French Atheists' Union."
Sam Perrin	1901–1998	Screenwriter	American Emmy Award-winning screenwriter.	"On The Burns and Allen Show, he [George Balzer] was paired with the more experienced scripter Sam Perrin. The two writers were a natural team, despite the fact that Balzer was a devout Catholic and Perrin a Jewish atheist."
Grayson Perry	1960–	Artist	British (English) artist, best known for his ceramics and for cross-dressing, the first ceramic artist and public transvestite to win the Turner Prize.	"Perry rages at the dead, he even has contempt for them. He has hung a collection of Victorian samplers – religious texts and domestic images embroidered by middle-class women – among which is his own, atheist, sampler. Anger is generous, and in raging against these dead peoples' beliefs he treats them as if they mattered."
Julia Phillips	1944–2002	Film producer	American Academy Award-winning film producer and author, the first woman to win an Oscar as a producer.	"Both her parents came from Russian Jewish backgrounds, but Julia was brought up as an atheist and an avid reader in Brooklyn, before the family moved, first to Great Neck, Long Island, and then to Milwaukee."
Herman Philipse	1951–	Philosopher	Dutch Professor of philosophy at Utrecht University. Philipse has written many philosophical works in Dutch, including the Atheist Manifesto and the Unreasonableness of Religion (Atheistisch manifest & De onredelijkheid van religie.	
Ruth Picardie	1964–1997	Journalist	British journalist and editor, noted for her memoir of living with breast cancer, Before I Say Goodbye.	"I found the self-mocking humour relentless, and would have almost been relieved if Ruth had given way to complete despair, which I'm sure she sometimes did in private. She and most of her friends were atheists. Would it have been easier for her, and for them, if they hadn't been? Instead, as a self-confessed "post-feminist chick" she found solace in Pret-a-Manger, Ghost and style magazines. It seems sad that these products acted as life-lines, but I suppose this is the reality of life in a secular age."
Massimo Pigliucci	1964–	Scientist	Italian Professor of Ecology and Evolution at the Stony Brook University and is known as an outspoken critic of creationism and advocate of science education.	"...I'm an atheist..."
Steven Pinker	1954–	Scientist	Canadian-born American psychologist.	"I never outgrew my conversion to atheism at 13, but at various times was a serious cultural Jew."
Allan Pinkerton	1819–1884	Businessperson	British (Scottish born) American detective and spy, best known for creating the Pinkerton Agency, the first detective agency of the United States.	"Although christened by a Baptist minister in the Gorbals (25 August 1819), he had a churchless upbringing and was a lifelong atheist."
Norman Pirie	1907–1997	Scientist	British (English) biochemist and virologist co-discoverer in 1936 of viral crystallization, an important milestone in understanding DNA and RNA.	"During sixty years from 1937 he also wrote over forty articles on the origins, distribution, and nature of life, taking the stance of a 'dogmatic atheist'."
Brad Pitt	1963–	Actor	American actor and film producer Pitt has received two Academy Award nominations and four Golden Globe Award nominations, winning one.	BILD: Do you believe in God? Brad Pitt (smiling): 'No, no, no!' BILD: Is your soul spiritual? Brad Pitt: 'No, no, no! I’m probably 20 per cent atheist and 80 per cent agnostic. I don’t think anyone really knows. You'll either find out or not when you get there, until then there's no point thinking about it.'"
Michael Pitt	1981–	Actor	American actor and musician.	"Does Pitt think suicide is selfish? 'I see why people think it is, and sometimes I do. And sometimes I don't think it's selfish. I'm probably an atheist, though I was raised a Catholic " and that whole religion is based on the first suicide, in many ways.'"
Fiona Pitt-Kethley	1954–	Author	British poet, novelist, travel writer and journalist.	"As a child she was very religious, and planned to become the first woman vicar. But she lost her faith when she discovered snogging because she couldn't bring herself to believe that it was sinful. She now describes herself as an atheist, but with "a penchant for the pagan gods"."
Ronald Plasterk	1957–	Scientist	Dutch prize-winning molecular geneticist and columnist, and Minister of Education, Culture and Science in the fourth Balkenende cabinet for the Labour Party.	"Ronald Plasterk (1957) is a convinced atheist. But he says expressly that he does not strive for atheism. "My own view cannot be gospel which I will defend at any cost. I respect belief, as long as people do not force it."
Sarah Polley	1979–	Actress	Canadian actress and director.	"When asked what directors she admires, Polley talks about Ingmar Bergman and Terrence Malick (she says his Thin Red Line "single-handedly brought me out of a deep depression. It shifted something in me. I'm an atheist, but it was the first time that it gave me faith in other people's faith")."
Fábio Porchat	1983–	Actor	Brazilian actor and comedian.	"I'm an atheist. I don't believe in anything. Absolutely nothing. As far as I'm concerned, he's dead, dead. Better him than me. Our state is secular."
Terry Pratchett	1948–2015	Author	British (English) Fantasy author known for his satirical Discworld series.	"I'm an atheist, at least to the extent that I don't believe in the objective existence of any big beards in the sky."
Derek J. de Solla Price	1922–1983	Scientist	British-American historian of science.	"...my father [Derek] was a British Atheist... from a rather well known Sephardic Jewish family..."
Kate Pullinger	–	Author	Canadian-born novelist and author of digital fiction.	"Spanish churches are dark and gloomy, fitting locations for a Christianity that often seems completely demented to an appreciative atheist like myself."
Philip Pullman	1946–	Author	British (English) author of His Dark Materials fantasy trilogy for young adults, which have atheism as a major theme.	"As an atheist I'm rather on difficult ground here, but presumably this is what a Christian believes."
Peter Purves	1939–	Actor	British (English) actor and television presenter, best known for a role in Doctor Who and presenting Blue Peter.	"Religion makes me angry but I don't get overheated about it but I really dislike it and am a confirmed atheist and I believe most of the world's troubles are caused by people who have some abounding faith in some stupid superstition. It also makes me sad and depresses me immensely that people can be so stupid. Defending this, that and the other based on total myths and nonsense."
