= List of atheists (surnames L to M) =

Atheists with surnames starting L to M, sortable by the field for which they are mainly known and nationality.

Name	Dates	Known as / for	Who	Reference
John Landis	1950–	American Film Director	Director of movies such as The Blues Brothers, An American Werewolf in London and Animal House.	"I'm an atheist and I certainly don't believe or care about Satan or Jesus". Stated in a radio interview on BBC 5, 29 Oct 2010.
Stieg Larsson	1954–2004	Swedish journalist	Author of the Millennium Trilogy and the founder of the anti-racist magazine Expo. Larsson specifically requested that no religious ceremonies should be held at his funeral.	"I was an atheist and won't feel any better because of religious ceremonies".
Geddy Lee	1953–	Singer	Lead singer and front man of Canadian progressive rock band Rush.	"I consider myself a Jew as a race, but not so much as a religion. I'm not down with religion at all. I'm a Jewish atheist, if that's possible… I celebrate the holidays in the sense that my family gets together for the holidays and I like being a part of that. So I observe the 'getting together' aspect.
Robert Lees	1912–2004	Hollywood screenwriter	The Invisible Woman, The Black Cat, Bud Abbott Lou Costello Meet Frankenstein, Abbott and Costello Meet the Invisible Man and numerous television shows to 1983	Lees self-identified as an atheist and a humanist in the talks he gave to atheist and humanist organizations after his retirement in 1983. But he was most proud of the speech he gave to the House Committee on UnAmerican Activities in 1951, which led to his blacklisting.
Vladimir Lenin	1870-1914	Russian politician	First leader of the USSR	"Lenin considered militant atheism to be so critical to his faction that he went beyond the Russian atheist tradition of Belinsky, Herzen, and Pisarev and organized a systematic, aggressive and uncompromising movement of antireligious agitation."
Michael Lewis	1960–	American financial journalist and non-fiction author	Liar's Poker, Moneyball, The Blind Side: Evolution of a Game and The Big Short	Lewis self-identified as an atheist in his nonfiction book Boomerang. While researching the book, he speaks with a priest. Priest: "But what is your religion?" Lewis: "I don't have one." Priest: "But you believe in God?"; Lewis: "No."
Till Lindemann	1963–	German singer	Front man of German industrial metal and Neue Deutsche Härte band Rammstein	"I'm as atheist as they come. If anything, I would call myself a Vitalist. I believe in the inner desires: Women, fishing, hunting. Everything that's fundamental, even if it's seen as offensive in our society. I'm convinced that would be very different if more people only followed their desires instead of subverting them."
Kazimierz Łyszczyński	1634–1689	He was a "martyr" of Polish atheism.	He was a Polish nobleman, landowner in Brest Litovsk Voivodeship of the Grand Duchy of Lithuania, philosopher, and soldier in the ranks of the Sapieha family, who was accused, tried, and executed for atheism in 1689.	Łyszczyński wrote a treatise entitled "De non existentia Dei" (the non-existence of God), which stated that God does not exist and that religions are the inventions of man.
Seth MacFarlane	1973–	American comedian, actor, writer, producer, singer	Creator of Family Guy, American Dad!, The Cleveland Show	"I do not believe in God. I'm an atheist. I consider myself a critical thinker, and it fascinates me that in the 21st century most people still believe in, as George Carlin puts it, 'the invisible man living in the sky'."
Bill Maher	1956–	American comedian	Host of Real Time with Bill Maher	"I'm an atheist pot smoker"
Diogo Mainardi	1962–	Brazilian journalist and writer	Columnist for Veja magazine, co-host from Manhattan Connection, founder of O Antagonista	"Although he claims to be an atheist, one of the few decorative items in his living room is a wooden oratory with the image of Saint Francis. “It's Brazilian, a gift from my mother.”
Mia Malkova	1992–	American pornographic actress and livestreamer	Known for her appearances in the Indian short film God, Sex and Truth and in several pornographic films	She said she is an atheist on Twitter, in 2020.
Karl Marx	1818–1883	Chief philosopher of the eponymous Marxism	Main thinker of 19th scientific, materialistic socialism after which his eponymous branch is named.	"Religion is the sigh of the oppressed creature, the heart of a heartless world, and the soul of soulless conditions. It is the opium of the people"
Sir Ian McKellen	1939–	Actor	English actor and gay rights activist.	"I have been reluctant to lobby on other issues I most care about - nuclear weapons (against), religion (atheist), capital punishment (anti), AIDS (fund-raiser) because I don't want to be forever spouting, diluting the impact of addressing my most urgent concern: legal and social equality for gay people worldwide."
Colin McGinn	1950–	British philosopher	Philosopher best known for new mysterianism	
Pauline McLynn	1962–	Irish character actress and author	Actress best known for her roles as Mrs Doyle in the Channel 4 sitcom Father Ted	“I was christened a Catholic but I'm a secular person. I was brought up an Irish Catholic at a time when the church and the state were so entwined in Ireland that you just didn't get a choice.It was more a habit than a religion to the point where I realised I wasn't practicing or anything anymore, it just meant so little that I didn't even miss it. I'm an atheist.”
Mike Mentzer	1951–2001	American IFBB professional bodybuilder	1979 Mr. Olympia heavyweight winner	"There is what's called a rational view of a creator. As I said, there cannot be a God as He is commonly defined. God is infinite, God is everywhere, God created the universe-that's an interesting one. There's no such thing as creating the universe or causing the universe to come into existence, as the universe is the ground of all causation! If there was a God, He would have to consist of some material substance and He'd have to live somewhere. Therefore, existence always existed, even in the context you just gave. If, as you said, it was proven somehow beyond a shadow of a doubt there was a rational creator and a life hereafter, yes, I would grab at the chance to be with my mother and father again. "
David Miliband	1965–	British politician	British Labour politician, Foreign Secretary from 2007 to 2010.	
Ed Miliband	1969–	British politician	British Labour politician, Leader of the Opposition and Leader of the Labour Party from 2010 to 2015.	
Fernando Morais	1946–	Brazilian writer	Brazilian journalist and writer. State deputy from São Paulo from 1979 to 1987.	In an interview with journalist Reinaldo Azevedo and lawyer Walfrido Warde, he said: “Why didn't I become a reader of Paulo Coelho? Because I don't believe in anything, I'm an atheist, I'm agnostic.”
Sean Murphy	1960–	American comics writer/artist	Hellblazer: City of Demons, Joe the Barbarian, American Vampire: Survival of the Fittest	Discussing his series Punk Rock Jesus in 2012: "Over my evolution from Catholic to atheist, I've inhabited a number of different outlooks, and many of the characters [in Punk Rock Jesus] embody those roles."
Douglas Murray	1979–	British writer, journalist and commentator	British neoconservative writer, journalist and commentator, vocal critic of political Islam and jihadism. Associate director of the Henry Jackson Society, associate editor of The Spectator, writing also for the Wall Street Journal and Standpoint, among others.	"Since it had always seemed to me that if you believed in God a ‘pick and mix’ approach to the central tenets of the faith was pointless, I said ‘yes’. But in fact I felt ‘no’. It wasn't that I had been wrestling over the doctrine of the incarnation, I simply felt that if I didn't believe in the virgin birth, I would not believe in God. The truth is I didn't and don't. The guilt has been lingering since. This is my atheist mea culpa."
