= Hassan Bahara =

Moroccan-Dutch writer

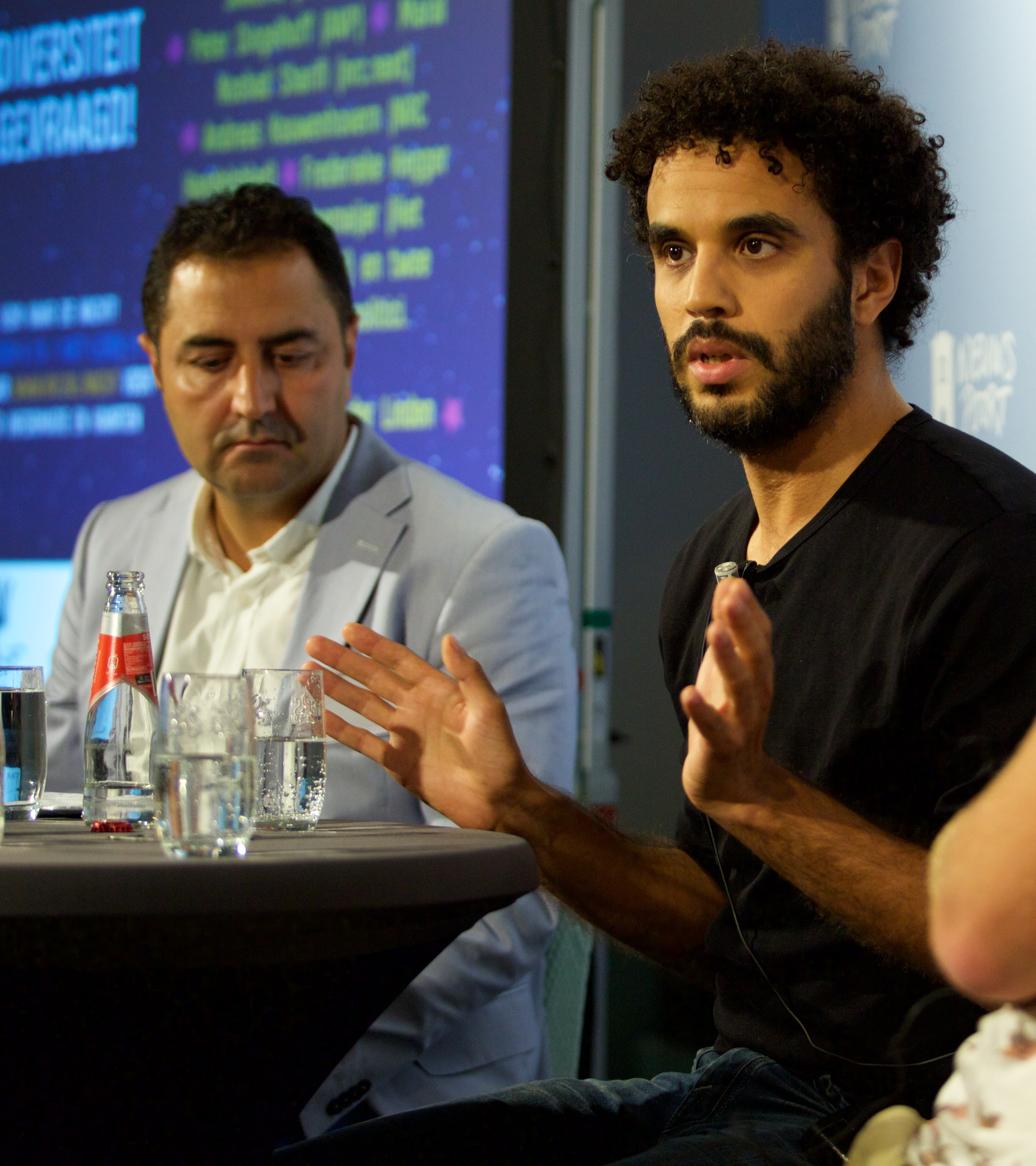
Hassan Bahar at the "Nacht van de Journalistiek" in 2015

Hassan Bahara (born 1978 in Teroua n'Aït Izou, Morocco) is a Moroccan-Dutch writer. He grew up in Amsterdam. He won the "El Hizjra Prize for Literature" in both 2000 and 2001. Een verhaal uit de stad Damsko is his debut novel. Bahara is editor for the satirical literary weekly Propria Cures. Bahara is an atheist and critical of Islam.
