= List of former Catholics =

Former Catholics or ex-Catholics are people who used to be Catholic for some time, but no longer identify as such. This includes both individuals who were at least nominally raised in the Roman Catholic faith, and individuals who converted to it in later life, both of whom later rejected and left it, or converted to other faiths (including the related non-Roman Catholic faiths). This page lists well-known individuals in history who are former Catholics.

One 2008 Pew Research Center study estimates that 10.1% of people in the United States describe themselves as former Catholics in some sense. In total the study reports that 44% of Americans profess a different religious affiliation than the one they were raised in. A majority joined another Christian denomination while a substantial minority are counted as currently unaffiliated. A significant number of former Catholics join mainline Protestant denominations with a similar worship pattern, such as Lutheranism or Anglicanism, while others have become Evangelical Christians.

Note: The list includes those who leave the Catholic Church including any Eastern Catholic Church which is in communion with it. People such as Eddie Doherty, who were allowed to transfer from the Latin Catholic Church to an Eastern Catholic church, or vice versa are not considered as "former Roman Catholics", while Eastern Catholics who convert to a non-Catholic church or another religion are considered as such, even though Eastern Catholics do not typically refer to themselves as "Roman".

== Individuals who converted to other Christian denominations ==
=== Eastern Orthodoxy ===
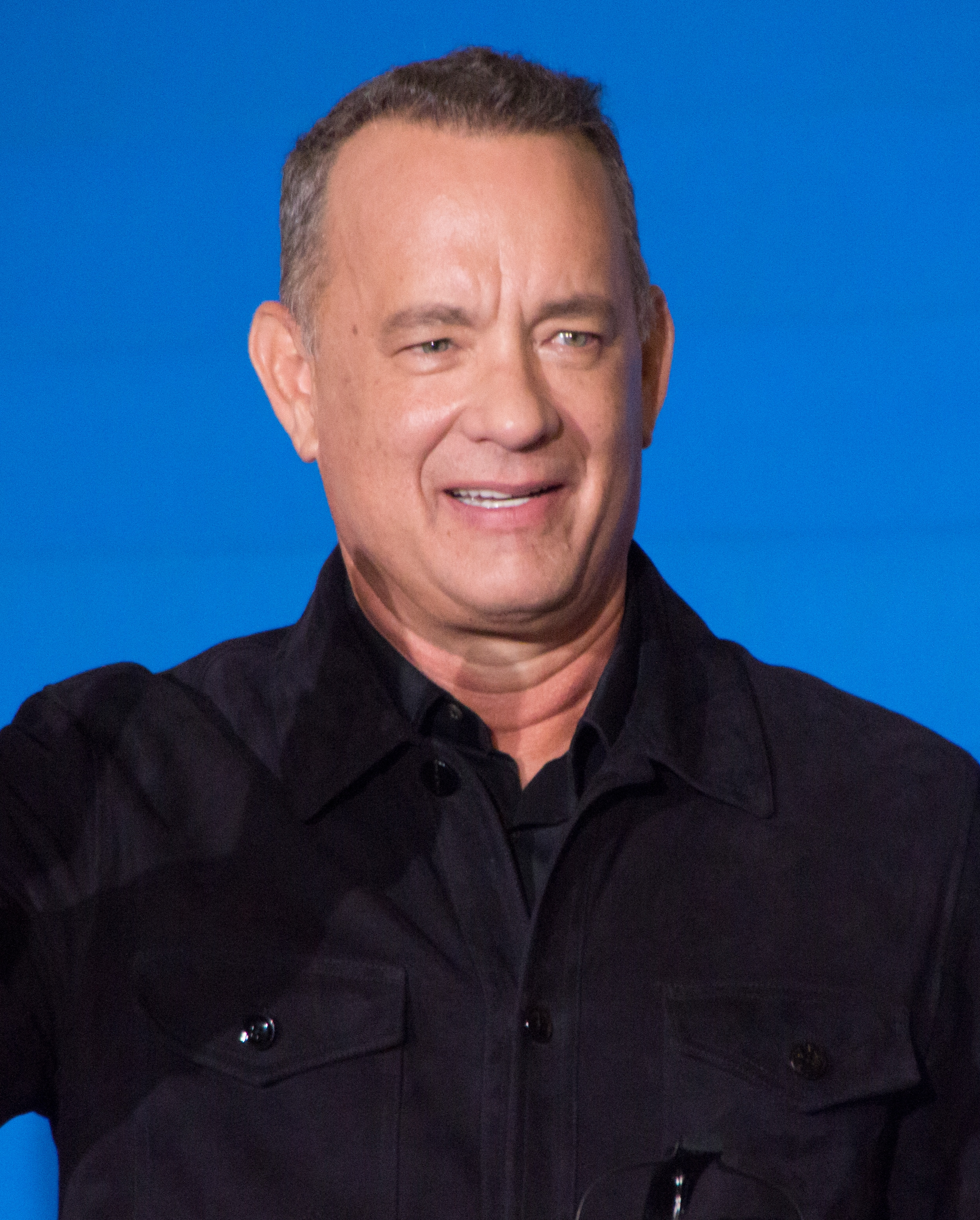
Tom Hanks.

- Boris III of Bulgaria, Tsar of Bulgaria, he was converted during his childhood in 1896 to the Bulgarian Orthodox Church.
- Rod Dreher, writer who converted to Catholicism and then to Eastern Orthodoxy
- H. Tristram Engelhardt Jr., philosopher and bioethicist
- Princess Miriam Ghazi, Spanish gemologist and jewellery designer. She converted to the Bulgarian Orthodox Church before marrying Kardam, Prince of Tarnovo.
- Marie-Chantal, Crown Princess of Greece, member of the former Greek royal family and wife of Pavlos, Crown Prince of Greece. She converted to the Greek Orthodox Church before marrying him.
- Tom Hanks, actor, was involved with Catholicism, Mormonism and the Nazarens as a child, and was a "Bible-toting evangelical teenager", and converted to the Greek Orthodox Church after marrying his second wife.
- Karl Matzek, artist who joined the Eastern Orthodox Church
- John Anthony McGuckin, scholar, poet, and priest of the Romanian Orthodox Church
- Alexis Toth, Ruthenian Catholic Church priest who converted to Orthodoxy and became a saint in the Orthodox Church in America
- Rosario Nadal, Spanish consultant, art director, and former model. She converted to the Bulgarian Orthodox Church before marrying Kyril, Prince of Preslav.
- Nathaniel (Popp), archbishop of the Orthodox Church in America's Romanian Episcopate and former interim Metropolitan of the Orthodox Church in America who converted from the Romanian Greek-Catholic Church on 15 February 1968
- Helen of Anjou, queen consort of the Serbian Kingdom
- Ita Rina, Yugoslav film actress and beauty queen
- Margarita Saxe-Coburg-Gotha, wife of Tsar Simeon II of Bulgaria. She converted to the Bulgarian Orthodox Church before marrying him.

=== Protestantism ===
==== Lutheranism ====
- Marie Cavallier (now Princess Marie of Denmark), converted upon marriage to Prince Joachim of Denmark
- Charles XIV John, King of Sweden and Norway, he converted in 1810 when he became crown prince.
- Friedrich Heiler, religious scholar in High Church Lutheranism. (Dispute about whether he truly left Catholicism)
- Henrik, Prince Consort of Denmark, converted upon marriage to Heiress Presumptive Margrethe (now Queen Margrethe II of Denmark)
- Philip I, Landgrave of Hesse, German nobleman and a champion of the Protestant Reformation, notable for being one of the most important of the early Protestant rulers in Germany.
- Sophia Jagiellon, Polish princess and Duchess of Brunswick-Lüneburg.
- Karel Lavrič, Slovenian liberal nationalist politician and orator
- Katharina Luther, former nun who married Martin Luther
- Martin Luther, Protestant reformer and theologian, excommunicated by papal bull Decet Romanum Pontificem
- Philip Melanchthon, Lutheran theologian and Protestant reformer
- Albert, Duke of Prussia, German prince, after converting to Lutheranism, became the first ruler of the Duchy of Prussia.
- Thorsten Schäfer-Gümbel, German politician of the SPD
- Maurice, Elector of Saxony, German prince and Elector of Saxony.
- Oscar I of Sweden, King of Sweden and Norway. He converted in 1810 when his father became crown prince.
- Primož Trubar, Slovenian Protestant preacher and writer
- Tim Walz, Governor of Minnesota and former U.S. Representative from Minnesota's 1st congressional district.
- Gustav Vasa, King of Sweden. He initiated the Protestant Swedish reformation.

==== Anglicanism ====
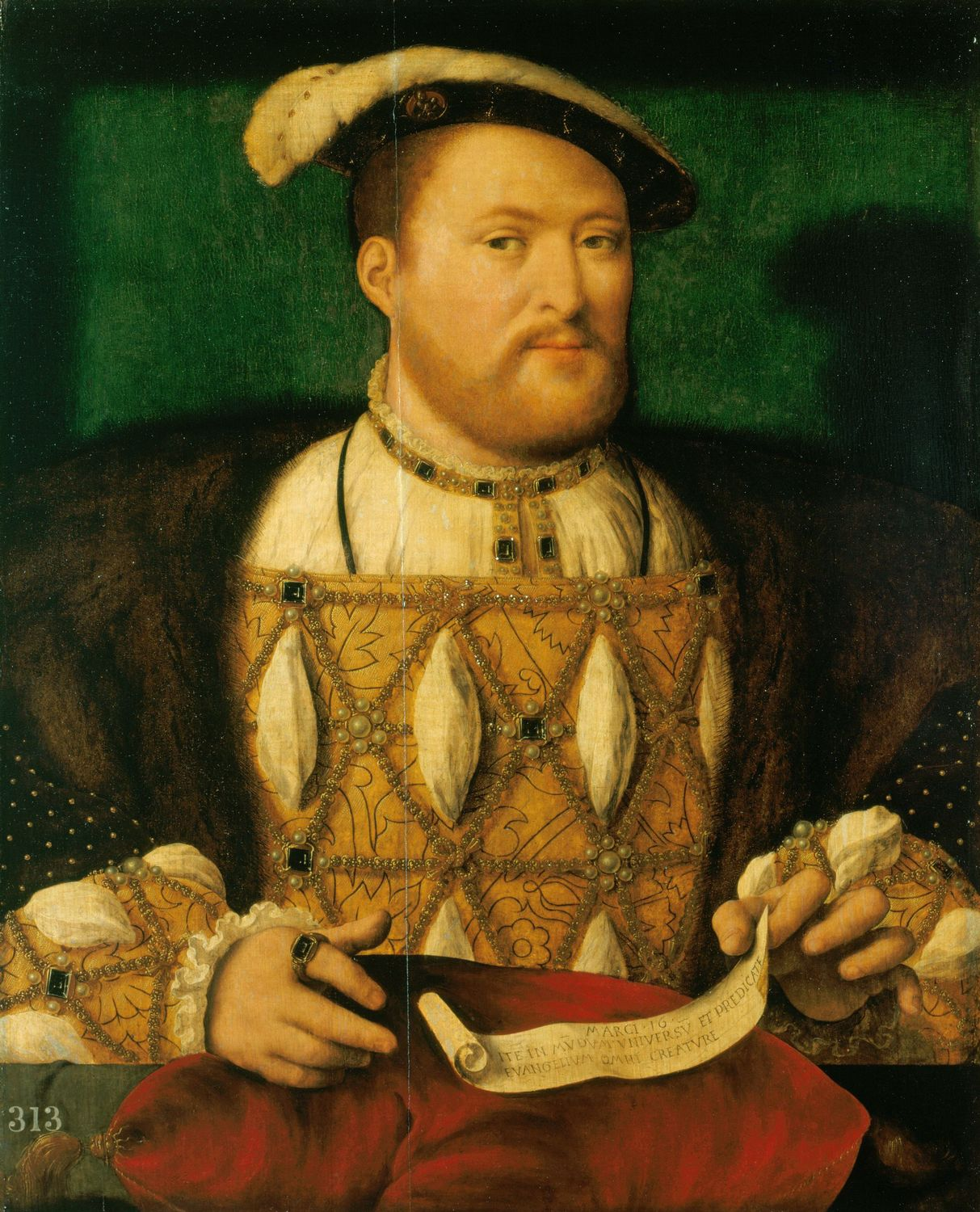
Henry VIII who made himself Supreme Head of the Church of England

- King Henry VIII, king of England who separated the Church of England from the Roman Catholic Church.
- Madeleine Albright, former US Secretary of State.
- Anne Boleyn, queen consort of England and second wife of Henry VIII.
- Pete Buttigieg, former mayor of South Bend, Indiana, a presidential candidate in the 2020 election, and former United States Secretary of Transportation.
- The Very Revd Miriam Byrne, Irish Catholic nun who became a cathedral provost in the Scottish Episcopal Church.
- James Francis Byrnes, politician and statesman, United States Senator, US Secretary of State, and former Associate Justice of the US Supreme Court, raised a Catholic in largely Protestant South Carolina, converted to Episcopalianism as an adult.
- Michael Coren, British-Canadian writer, clergyman, columnist, and host of The Michael Coren Show
- Thomas Cranmer, Archbishop of Canterbury and Reformer who helped reform the Church of England during the English Reformation.
- Alberto Cutié, priest who was received in the Episcopal Church after a leave of absence granted by his former bishop and decided to continue priestly ministry as a married man.
- Matthew Fox, scholar and priest who became an Episcopalian after being silenced by the Vatican for heresy and expelled by the Dominicans for disobedience.
- Bernard Kenny, New Jersey politician, former majority leader of the New Jersey Senate raised Catholic, became an Episcopalian in protest over Catholic position on abortion.
- Jim McGreevey, former governor of New Jersey, who became an Episcopalian.
- Thomas Nast, political cartoonist, baptized a Catholic in Germany, emigrated to the United States and became an Episcopalian as an adult.
- Autumn Phillips, received into the Church of England before marrying Peter Phillips to retain his place in the line of succession
- Kevin Rudd, former prime minister of Australia.
- The Most Revd Katharine Jefferts Schori, first woman primate in the Anglican Communion
- Josette Sheeran, director of the United Nations World Food Programme and former editor with the Washington Times, left the Catholic Church to join the Unification Church and later joined the Episcopal Church.
- John B. Switzer, theologian at Spring Hill College (the Jesuit College of the South); Switzer was a seminarian for the Catholic Diocese of Biloxi studying at the Pontifical North American College in Rome and left seminary training six months before ordination to marry. He is now a priest of the Episcopal Diocese of Mississippi and continues to teach at Spring Hill.

==== Reformed ====
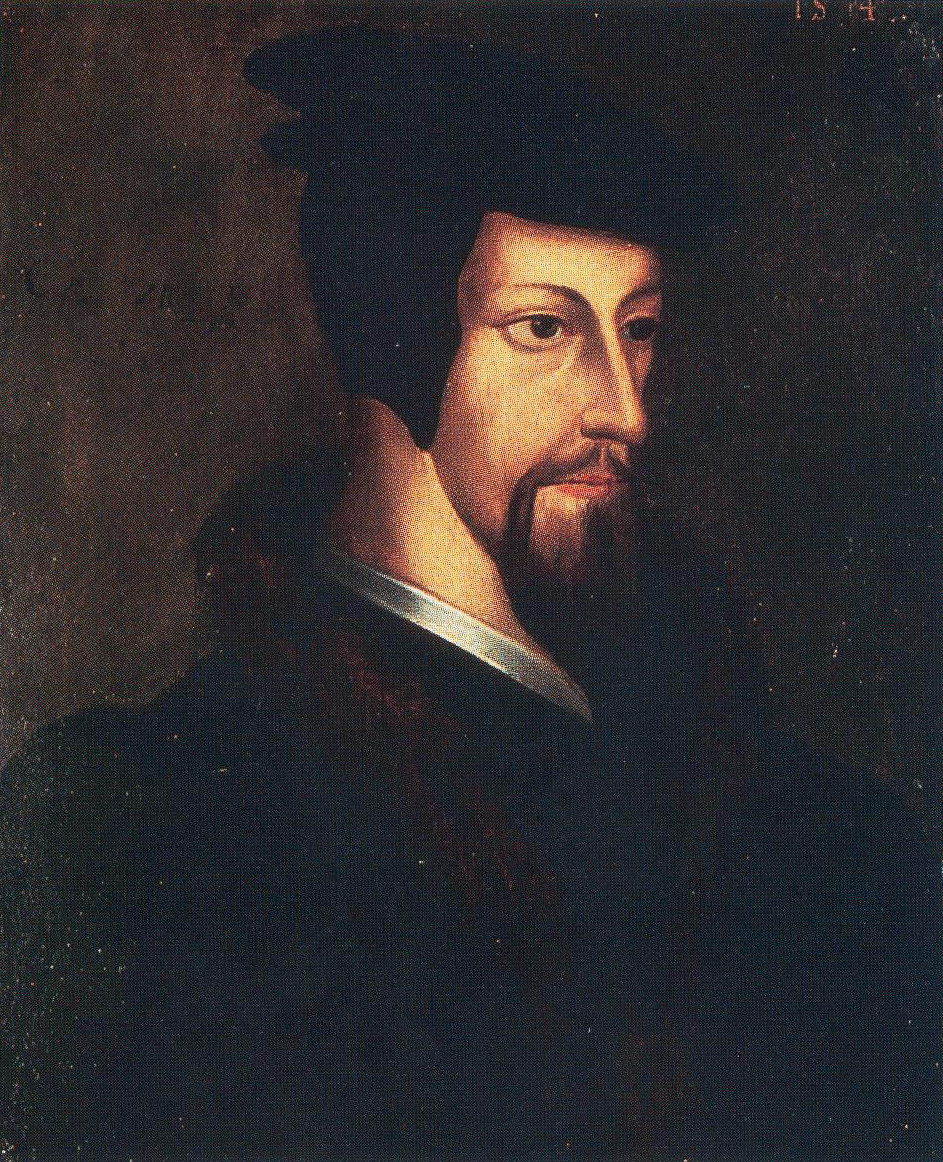
John Calvin, Protestant Reformer.

- John Calvin, French religious reformer
- Jeanne d'Albret, Queen of Navarre and mother of Henry VI, King of France. She converted in 1560 to Calvinism.
- John Barrasso, United States Senator from Wyoming, raised Catholic, converted to Presbyterianism
- Charlotte of Bourbon, Princess consort of Orange as the third wife of William the Silent, Prince of Orange.
- François Bruys, French historian and essayist
- Charles Chiniquy, American anti-Catholic writer
- Clive Derby-Lewis, South African Far-Right politician and convicted murderer
- Diana DeGette, U.S. Representative for Colorado's 1st congressional district, converted to Presbyterianism
- Mark Driscoll, founding pastor of Mars Hill Church in Seattle
- Renée of France, French princess and Duchess of Ferrara. She became an important supporter of the Protestant Reformation and ally of John Calvin.
- Melissa Joan Hart, actress, converted to Presbyterianism.
- John Knox, Scottish religious reformer
- Dorothy Lucey, news reporter on Good Day LA, converted to the Presbyterian Church (USA)
- Tom Tancredo, former U.S. Representative for Colorado's 6th congressional district, U.S. Presidential candidate in 2008, Constitution Party candidate for Governor of Colorado in 2010, now Evangelical Presbyterian
- George Wishart, Scottish religious martyr

==== Pentecostalism ====
- Marcelo Crivella, mayor of Rio de Janeiro, Brazil
- J. Regina Hyland, pioneer in the field of animals and religion
- Edir Macedo, founded the Universal Church of the Kingdom of God
- Efraín Ríos Montt, former de facto President of Guatemala
- Mariano Rivera, Panamanian-American Hall of Fame baseball pitcher for the New York Yankees
- Marina Silva, Brazilian politician and environmentalist.

==== Seventh-day Adventism ====
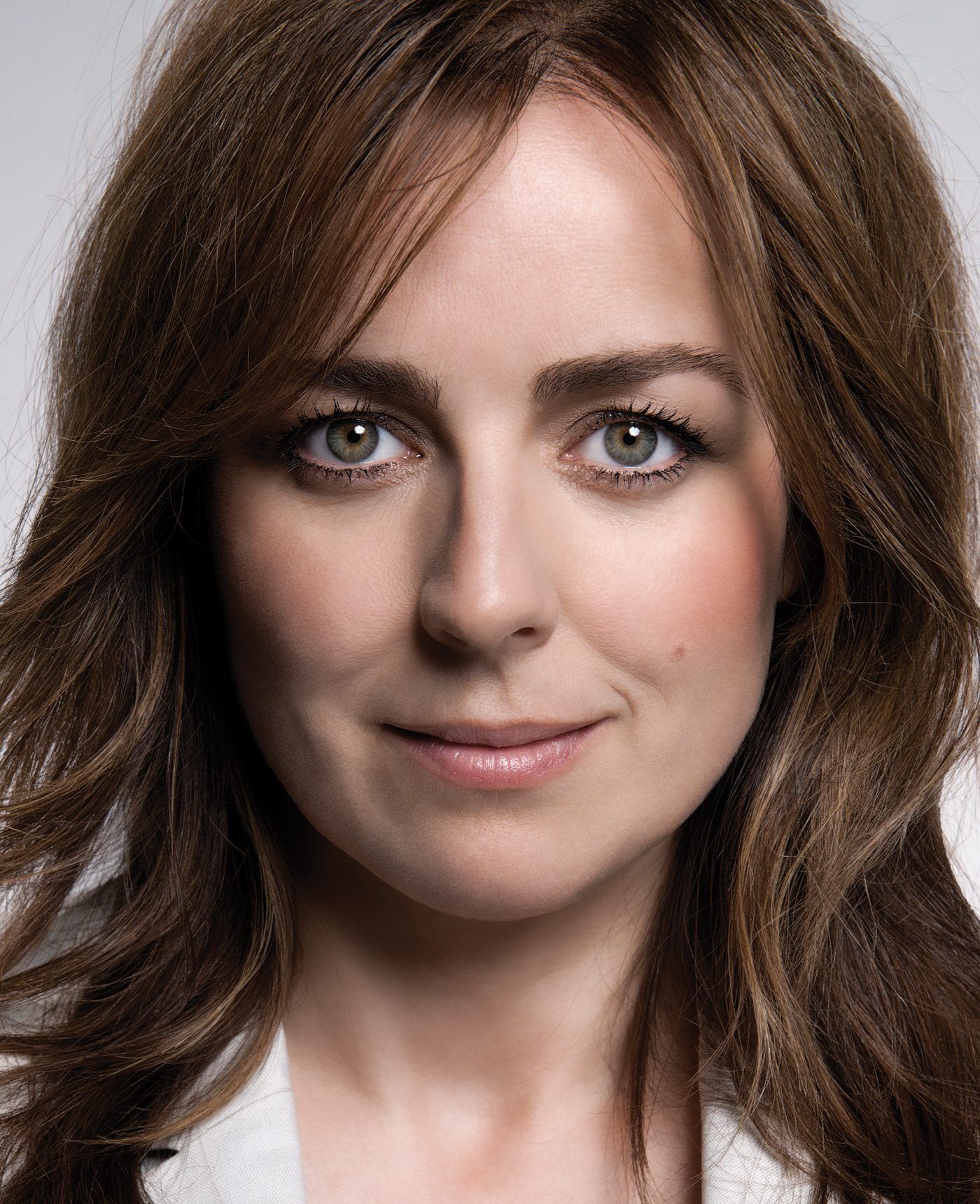
Marianne Thieme.

- Mark Finley, pastor and speaker emeritus of It Is Written (Adventist TV program)
- Marianne Thieme, Dutch politician, Party for the Animals co-founder, converted to Adventism in 2006
- Walter Veith, scientist, author and speaker known for his work in nutrition, creationism and other Christian topics

==== Other Protestant ====
- Stephen Baldwin, actor converted to non-denominational Protestantism.
- James Comey, attorney and former Director of the Federal Bureau of Investigation, converted to the United Methodist Church
- Tirso Cruz III, Filipino singer and media personality, converted to non-denominational Protestantism in 2009
- Lana Del Rey, singer, now attends a non-denominational Protestant church.
- Matthew Dowd, political consultant, chief strategist for the 2004 Bush-Cheney presidential campaign, raised a Catholic, converted to non-denominational Protestantism.
- Bob Enyart, Christian talk-show host, pastor of a non-denominational Protestant church.
- Scott Greer, Daily Caller alumnus, podcaster and author, converted to Protestantism
- Johannes Gossner, priest, became Protestant, probably Lutheran
- Marjorie Taylor Greene, politician, converted to non-denominational evangelical Protestantism.
- Sean Hannity, Irish American radio host, political commentator and media personality, raised Catholic, left the Catholic Church in 2019 and became an evangelical Protestant.
- Vanessa Hudgens, actress and singer, converted to non-denominational Protestantism.
- Jan Hus, theologian who founded the Hussites, influenced the Protestant Reformation
- Jerome of Prague, friend of Jan Hus and Short-Lived leader of the Hussites
- John Kasich, Governor of Ohio, converted after parents' death to non-denominational Protestantism.
- Mathieu Kérékou, former president of Benin serving for 45 years from 1971 to 2006
- Manny Pacquiao, Filipino boxer and politician, Raised Catholic, converted to Evangelical Protestantism later in life.
- Sarah Palin, former governor of Alaska, converted with family as a child to non-denominational Protestantism.
- Domineco da Pascia and Silvestro Maruffi, former Italian monks and friends of Girolamo Savonarola
- Tim Pawlenty, Governor of Minnesota 2003–2011, converted and attending Protestant church with spouse Mary Pawlenty
- Mike Pence, Vice President of the United States, raised Catholic, converted to Evangelical Protestantism while in college.
- Gina Rodriguez, actress, now attends a non-denominational Protestant church.
- Maria Elvira Salazar, Cuban-American journalist and politician, raised Catholic, converted to Evangelical Protestantism as a young adult.
- Gary Valenciano, Filipino singer and media personality, converted to non-denominational Protestantism in November 1985

=== Old Catholic and Independent Catholic churches ===
- Joris Vercammen, Archbishop of Utrecht, spiritual leader of the Utrecht Union of Old Catholic Churches
- Manuel Alonso Corral, Palmarian Catholic Church (anti)pope
- Clemente Domínguez y Gómez, Palmarian Catholic Church (anti)pope
- Gregorio Aglipay, Filipino priest who joined the Philippine Independent Church.

=== Christian Science ===
- Joan Crawford, American actress
- Doris Day, American actress
- Philip Kerr, 11th Marquess of Lothian, British Ambassador

=== The Church of Jesus Christ of Latter-day Saints ===
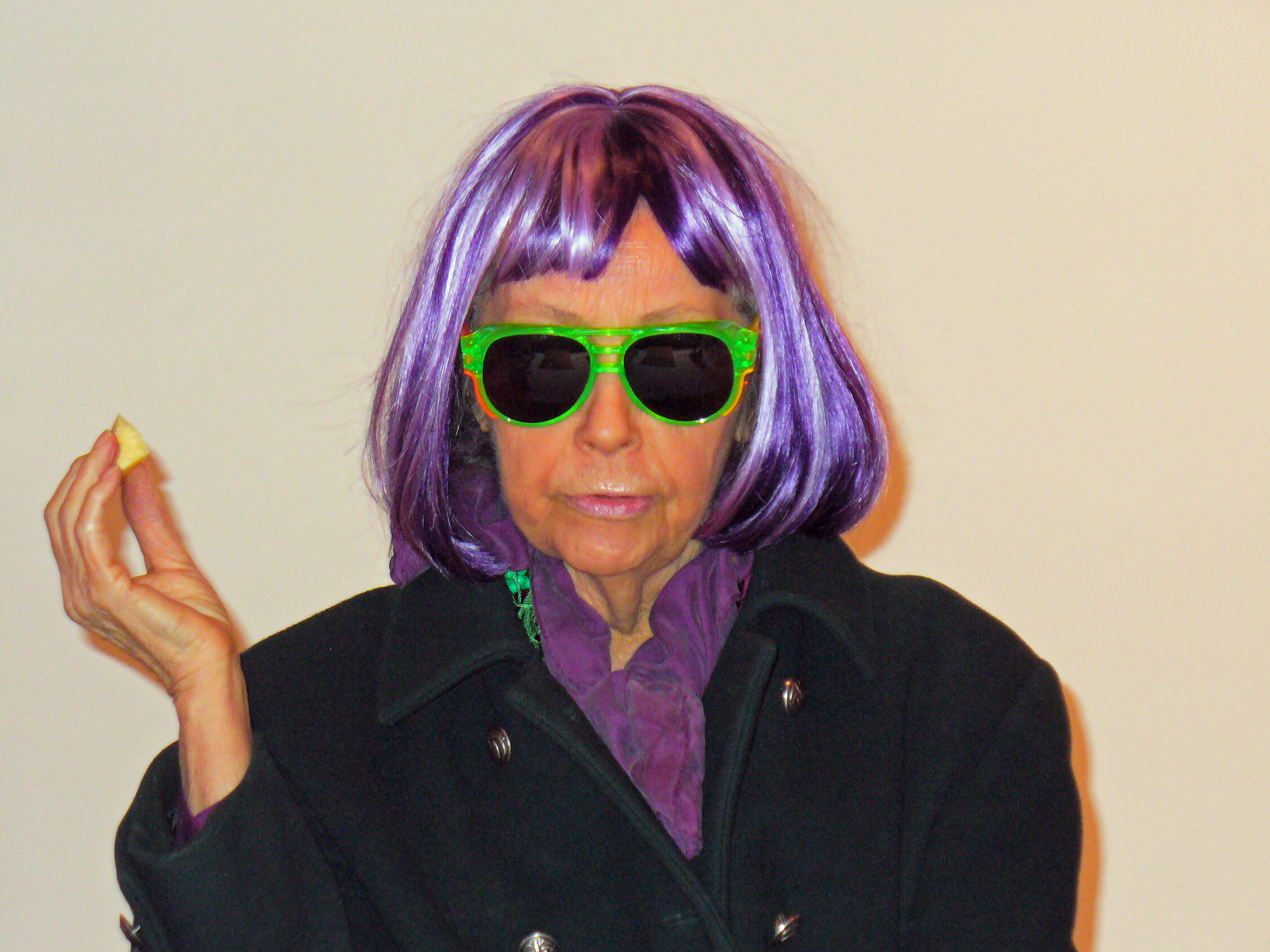
Ultra Violet.

- Isabelle Collin Dufresne, later known as Ultra Violet, one of the Warhol superstars
- Glenn Beck
- Mia Love

== Individuals who converted to other religions ==
=== God-Believers ===
The 'God-believers' (Gottgläubig) movement was an unofficial and unorganised religion in Nazi Germany. Most of the top Nazi leaders had already disaffiliated before the Nazi seizure of power, but even some of the lower ranking Nazi bureaucrats and representatives began disaffiliating from the Catholic and Lutheran Churches over the course of the 1930s as a direct result the gradual worsening of relations with the churches, whom they accused of meddling in Germany's political affairs. These people stressed they still believed in a creative power who guided the German nation and rejected atheism. However, the movement disappeared shortly after World War II, and was last referenced in Allied occupation documents in 1946.

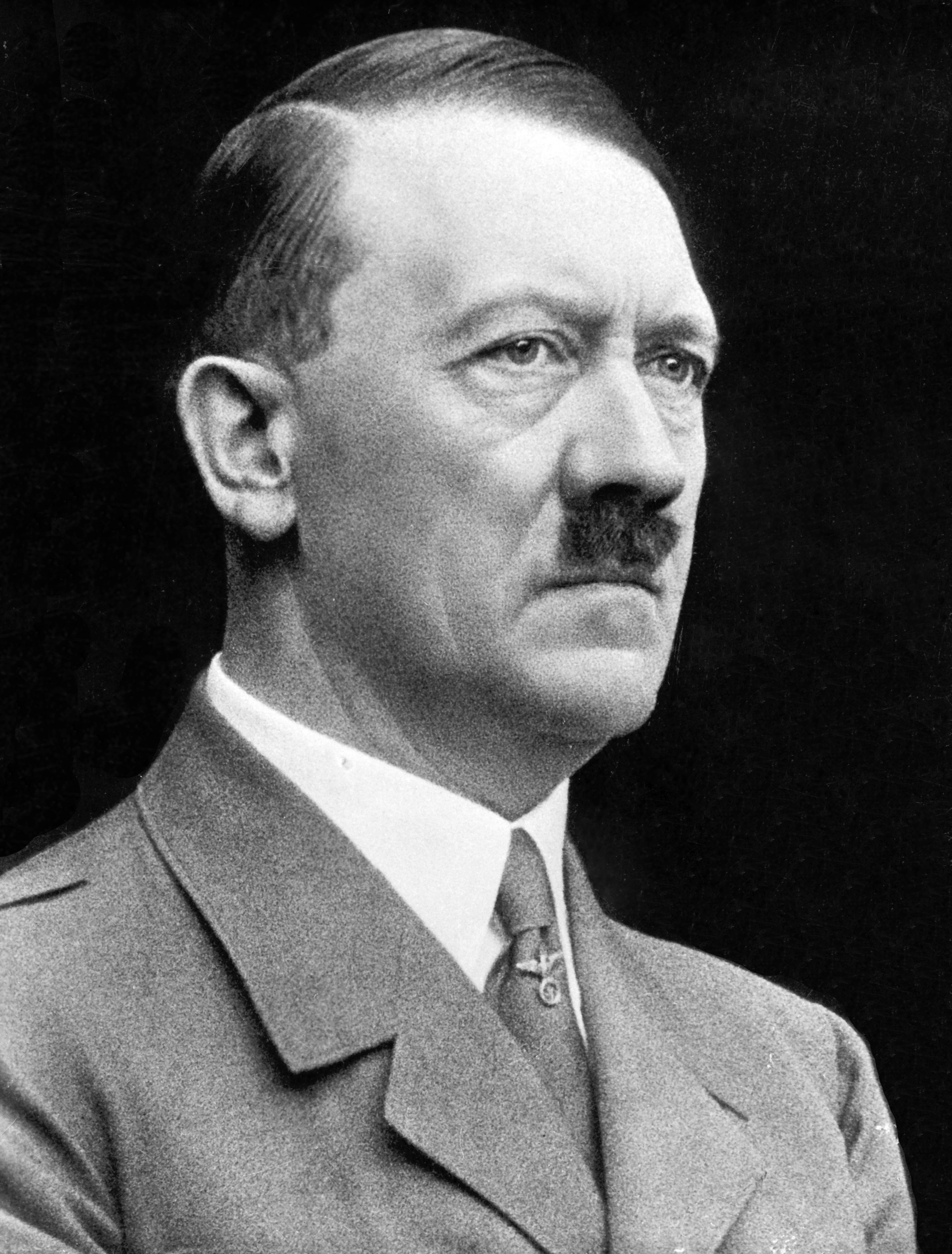
Adolf Hitler and several other key Nazis had abandoned the Catholic Church in their late-teens and early twenties.

- Adolf Hitler, leader of Germany from 1933 to 1945
- Heinrich Himmler, SS-Reichsfuhrer
- Reinhard Heydrich, SS-Obergruppenfuhrer
- Carl Röver, District Leader of Weser-Ems
- Joseph Goebbels, Reich Minister of Public Enlightenment and Propaganda

=== Other former Catholics ===
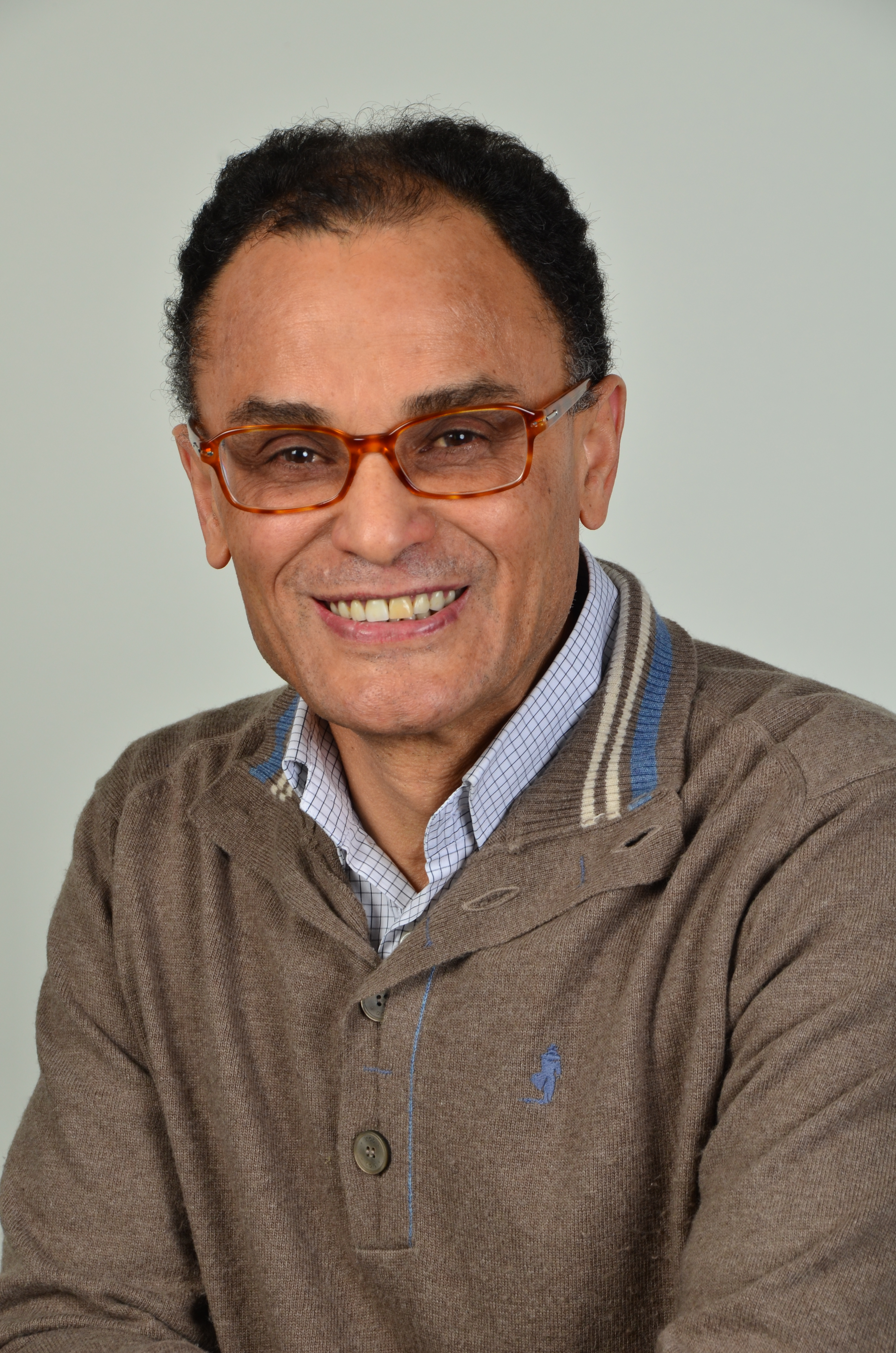
Magdi Allam, left Islam for Catholicism, then left Catholicism.

- Anne Rice, American writer, converted from Roman Catholicism and made this official through several messages on her website on 29 July 2010. She no longer wished to be referred to as a 'Christian', though retained her belief in Christ, disagreeing with various positions of the Roman Catholic Church.
- Magdi Allam, Egyptian–Italian journalist who publicly converted from Sunni Islam to Catholicism in 2008, baptised by Pope Benedict XVI himself. He left the Catholic Church dissatisfied after the election of Pope Francis in 2013, primarily because he thought the Church failed to take a tough stance against Islam; he remained a Christian, however.

=== Hinduism ===
- Julia Roberts, American actress who born from a Catholic mother, converted to Hinduism in 2010 after the Eat Pray Love film shooting in September 2009 in Haryana, India.

=== Buddhism ===
- Roberto Baggio, Italian footballer
- Lokanatha (Salvatore Cioffi), Italian Theravadin Buddhist missionary monk
- Pema Chödrön (Deirdre Blomfield-Brown), Tibetan Buddhist nun, mother and grandmother
- Gotamī (Martina Catania) Italian bhikkhunī and writer
- Tsai Chih Chung, Taiwanese cartoonist
- Patrick Duffy, actor
- Fabian Fucan, Japanese writer and religious brother in Society of Jesus, eventually converted to Zen Buddhism.
- Sabina Guzzanti, Italian satirist, actress, writer and producer
- John Daido Loori, Zen Buddhist rōshi and the abbot of Zen Mountain Monastery
- Nyanatiloka Mahathera (Anton Walther Florus Gueth), founder of Island Hermitage and one of the earliest western Buddhist monk in modern time.
- Leung Man-tao, Hong Kong writer, critic and host
- Michael O'Keefe, Irish-American actor, raised Catholic, became a practicing Zen Buddhist in 1981.
- Christine Rankin, New Zealand politician and former head of Ministry of Social Development.
- Hwang Woo-Suk, South Korean scientist
- Allan Bennett, an English Buddhist and former member of the Hermetic Order of the Golden Dawn, an early friend and influential teacher of occultist Aleister Crowley.

=== Islam ===
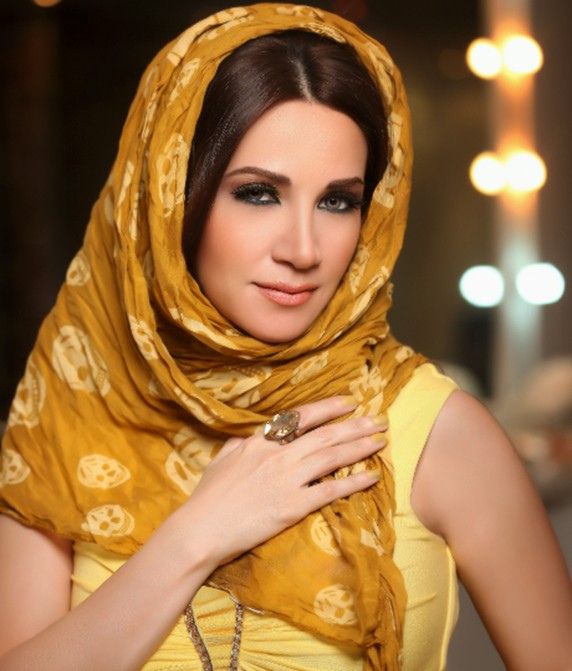
Diana Haddad

- Kareem Abdul-Jabbar, American Hall of Fame basketball player, book author, born Ferdinand Lewis Alcindor, Jr., raised Catholic in New York City where he attended Catholic schools, converted to Islam in 1971 at age 24.
- Keith Ellison, first Muslim to serve in the United States Congress
- Everlast, Irish-American rapper and guitar player
- Abdur Raheem Green, British Islamic preacher, raised Catholic
- René Guénon, French philosopher
- Diana Haddad, singer raised in the Maronite Church
- Murad Wilfred Hofmann, diplomat
- John Walker Lindh, American captured as an enemy combatant during the United States' invasion of Afghanistan in November 2001; baptized Catholic, he converted to Sunni Islam at age 16.
- Ingrid Mattson, president of the Islamic Society of North America. (She abandoned Catholicism years before her conversion to Islam)
- Matthew Saad Muhammad, boxer
- Peter Murphy, lead singer of Bauhaus
- Sinéad O'Connor, ordained as a priest in the Irish Orthodox Catholic and Apostolic Church by Michael Cox in 1999; accepted Islam in 2018, becoming Shuhada' Davitt
- Vinnie Paz, also known as Ikon the Verbal Hologram; American rapper for the underground hip hop group Jedi Mind Tricks
- Franck Ribéry, French footballer, converted in 2006 to marry his Muslim girlfriend
- Abel Xavier, Portuguese footballer, grew up in a strict Catholic background in Portuguese Mozambique

=== Judaism ===
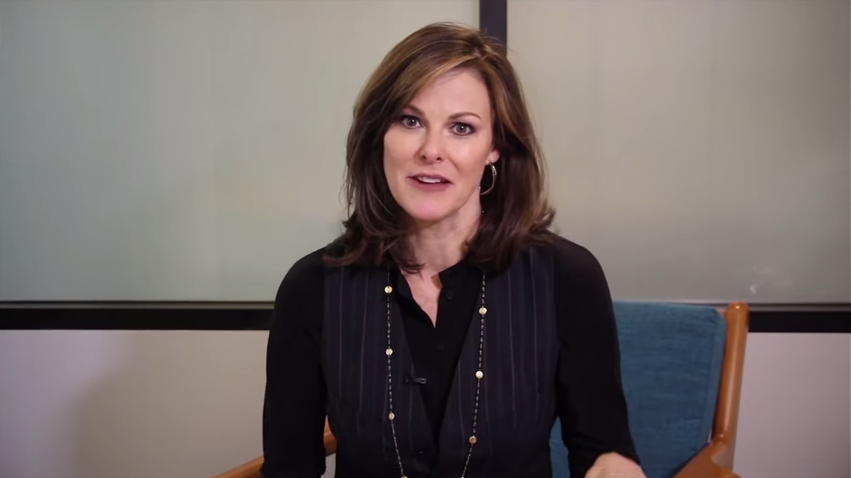
Campbell Brown

- Abraham ben Abraham, Polish Talmudic scholar (conflicting stories though)
- B'nai Moshe, Peruvian community of Inca descent which embraced Judaism
- Bishop Bodo, deacon
- Campbell Brown, American television news reporter, previously an anchor and political pundit for CNN and a former co-anchor of NBC's Weekend Today
- Yisrael Campbell, comedian
- Stephen Dubner, American author
- Abe Foxman, lawyer, activist and former head of the Anti-Defamation League. Born into a Jewish family, he was left with a Polish woman during World War II, who baptized him and raised him Catholic; he was returned to his parents in 1944, whereupon he reverted to Judaism.
- Paula Fredriksen, American scholar and historian of religion
- Aaron Freeman, American journalist and comedian
- Thomas Jones, English publisher
- John King, American journalist and the host of CNN's State of the Union
- Anne Meara (1929–2015), American comedian and actress, partner and wife of Jerry Stiller
- Mary Doria Russell, American author
- Jews of San Nicandro, Roman Catholic proselyte community to Judaism in Italy
- Joseph Abraham Steblicki, teacher and treasurer
- Karen Tintori, American author of fiction and nonfiction
- Géza Vermes, biblical scholar, Hebraist and historian of religion, best known for being an eminent historical Jesus scholar and translator of the Dead Sea Scrolls; a former Catholic priest of Jewish descent, he rediscovered his Jewish roots, abandoned Christianity and converted to Liberal Judaism.
- John David Scalamonti, former Catholic priest, converted to Orthodox Judaism.
- Kenneth Cox, former Catholic priest; changed his name to Abraham Carmel and converted to Orthodox Judaism.

=== Kabbalah ===
- Ariana Grande, American actress and singer
- Madonna, American singer-songwriter, actress, and businesswoman

=== Raëlism ===
- Brigitte Boisselier, mostly known for her association with Clonaid and the Raëlian Church, raised as a Catholic in Champagne-Ardenne, holds a doctorate in physical chemistry from the University of Dijon in France and another one in analytical chemistry from the University of Houston

=== Scientology ===
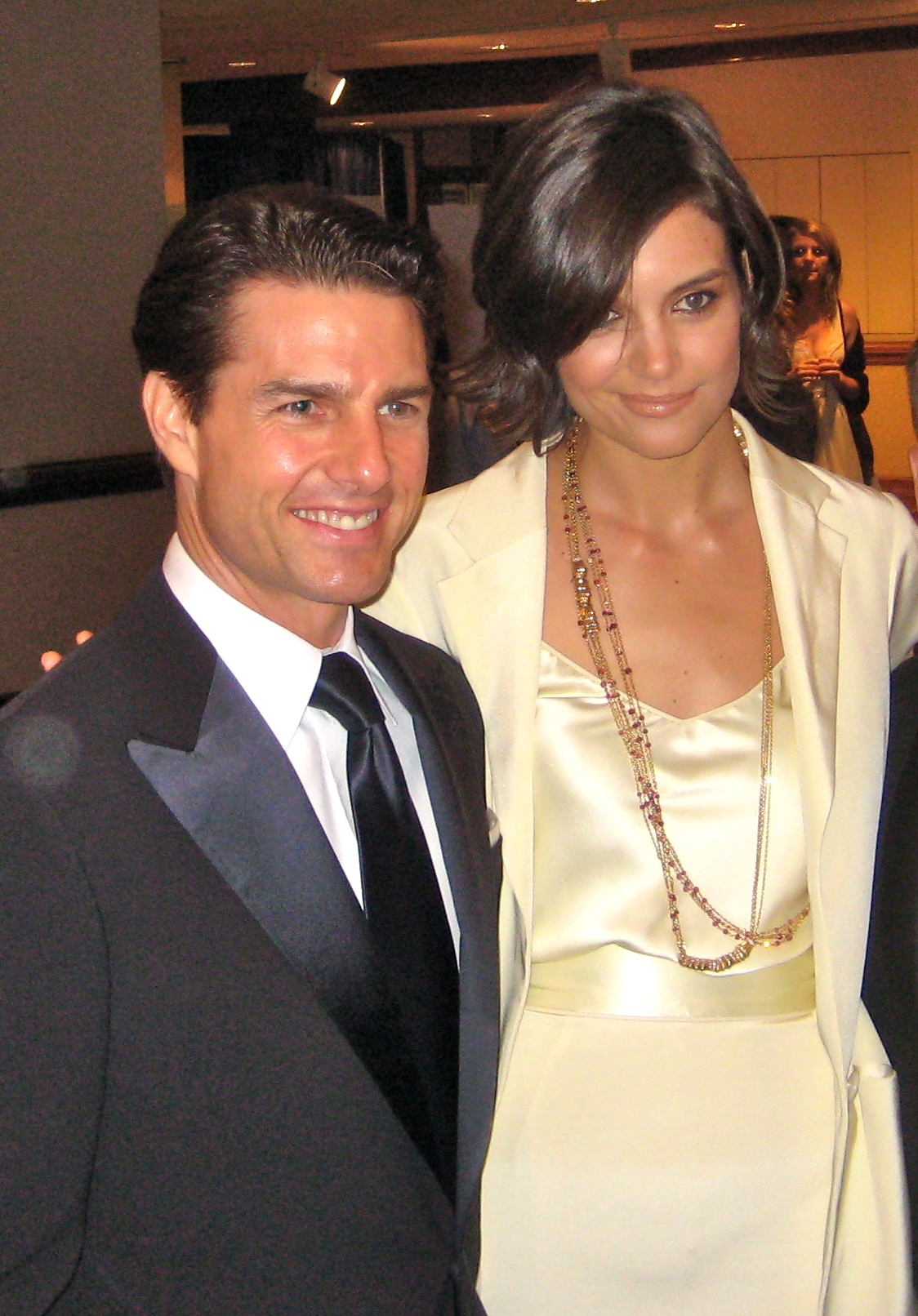
Tom Cruise and Katie Holmes in May 2009

- Tom Cruise, American actor, originally desired to become a priest. His girlfriend Katie Holmes married him and also switched from Catholicism to Scientology, but upon her divorce from Cruise in 2012, she returned to the Roman Catholic Church.
- Jenna Elfman, American actress
- David Miscavige, leading figure in Scientology
- John Travolta, American actor, in 1975
- Nancy Cartwright, American actress
- Catherine Bell, American actress

=== Debatable ===
This section lists some who, while adopting ideas that some others would consider incompatible with the Catholic faith, may have defected from the Church neither by a formal act nor even informally by an act of heresy, schism or apostasy. Mere attendance at services of another religion or adoption of certain meditation techniques need not signify abandonment of one's own religion. According to a 2009 survey of the Pew Research Center Forum on Religion and Public Life, one in five American Catholics report that they at times attend places of worship other than the local Catholic parish (which does not have to mean non-Catholic places). The same survey noted that some Catholics incorporate "yoga as a spiritual practice", emphasize psychics, and draw on and involve themselves in other religious movements.

- Fidel Castro, excommunicated
- Jack Clayton, British director who identified himself as an "ex-Catholic"
- Irene Dailey, American actress who became a Unitarian
- Christopher Durang, American playwright
- Edward Gibbon, converted to Catholicism at Oxford University, a year later, under threat of being disinherited, returned to Anglicanism
- Heather Graham, American actress (Transcendental Meditation)
- Patrick Hamilton, Scottish martyr, debatable if he fully broke with Catholicism
- Michael Harrington, American political activist, grew up Catholic, lapsed whilst adopting more radical politics.
- Ammon Hennacy, American pacifist, Christian anarchist, vegetarian and social activist
- Anne Jackson, American actress of Irish and Croatian extraction; married to Eli Wallach
- Bill Keller, New York Times editor who said he was a "collapsed Catholic"
- Richard Lugner, excommunicated, he is a successful Austrian entrepreneur in the construction industry, and a Viennese society figure
- Emmanuel Milingo, excommunicated, former Zambian Roman Catholic archbishop
- Conor Oberst, singer-songwriter

== Atheism, agnosticism, or non-religious ==
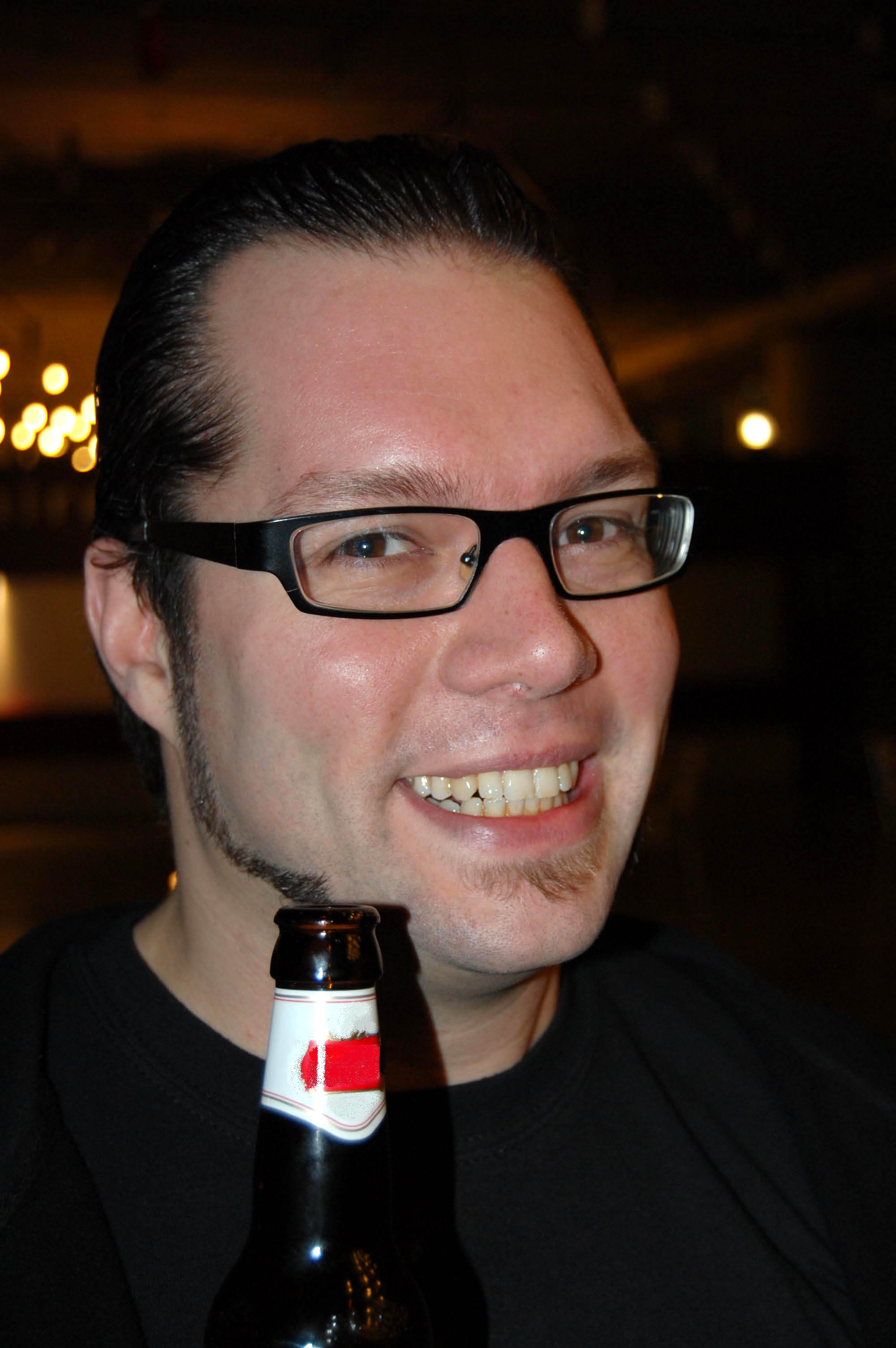
Alex Agnew

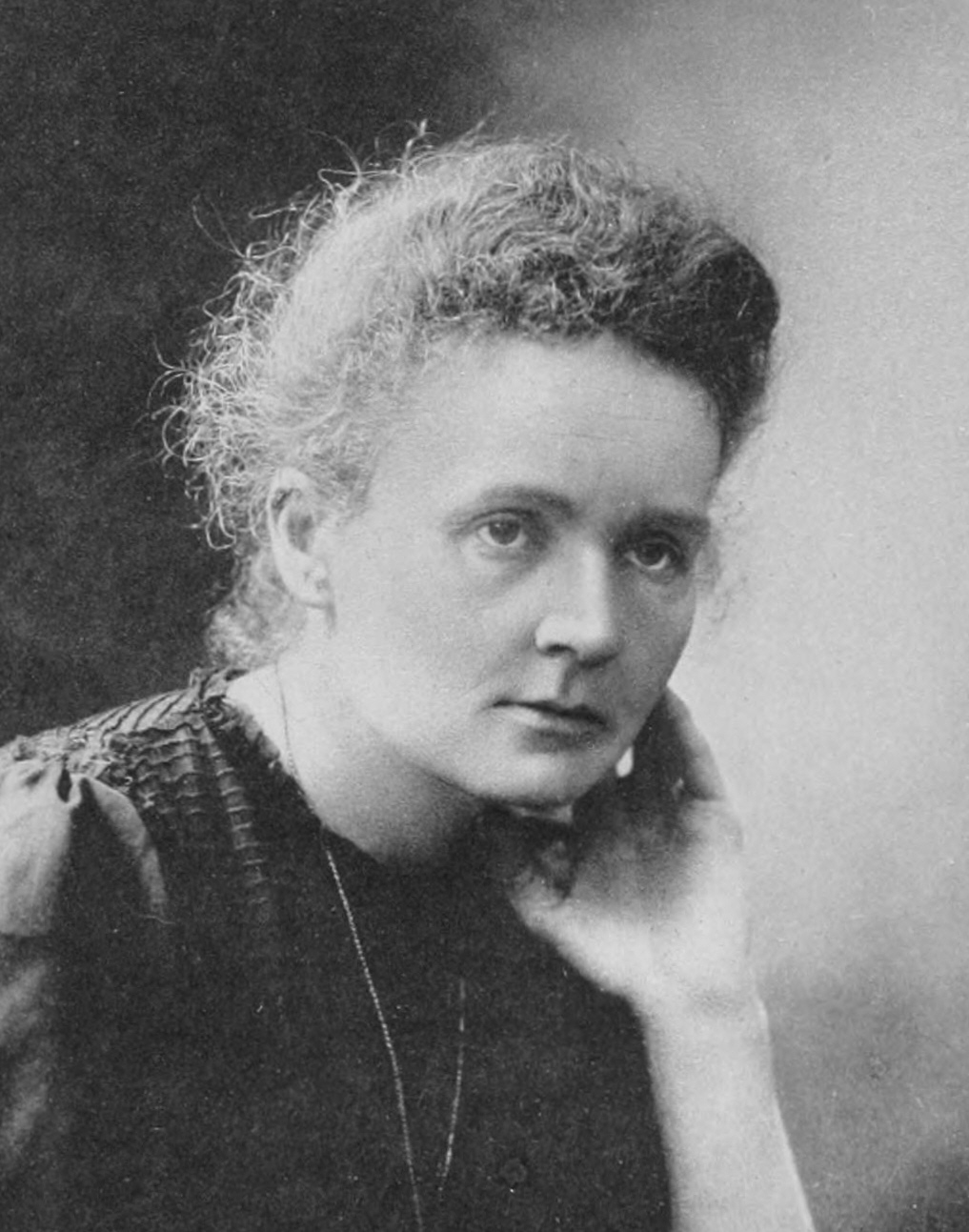
Marie Curie, double Nobel Prize winner

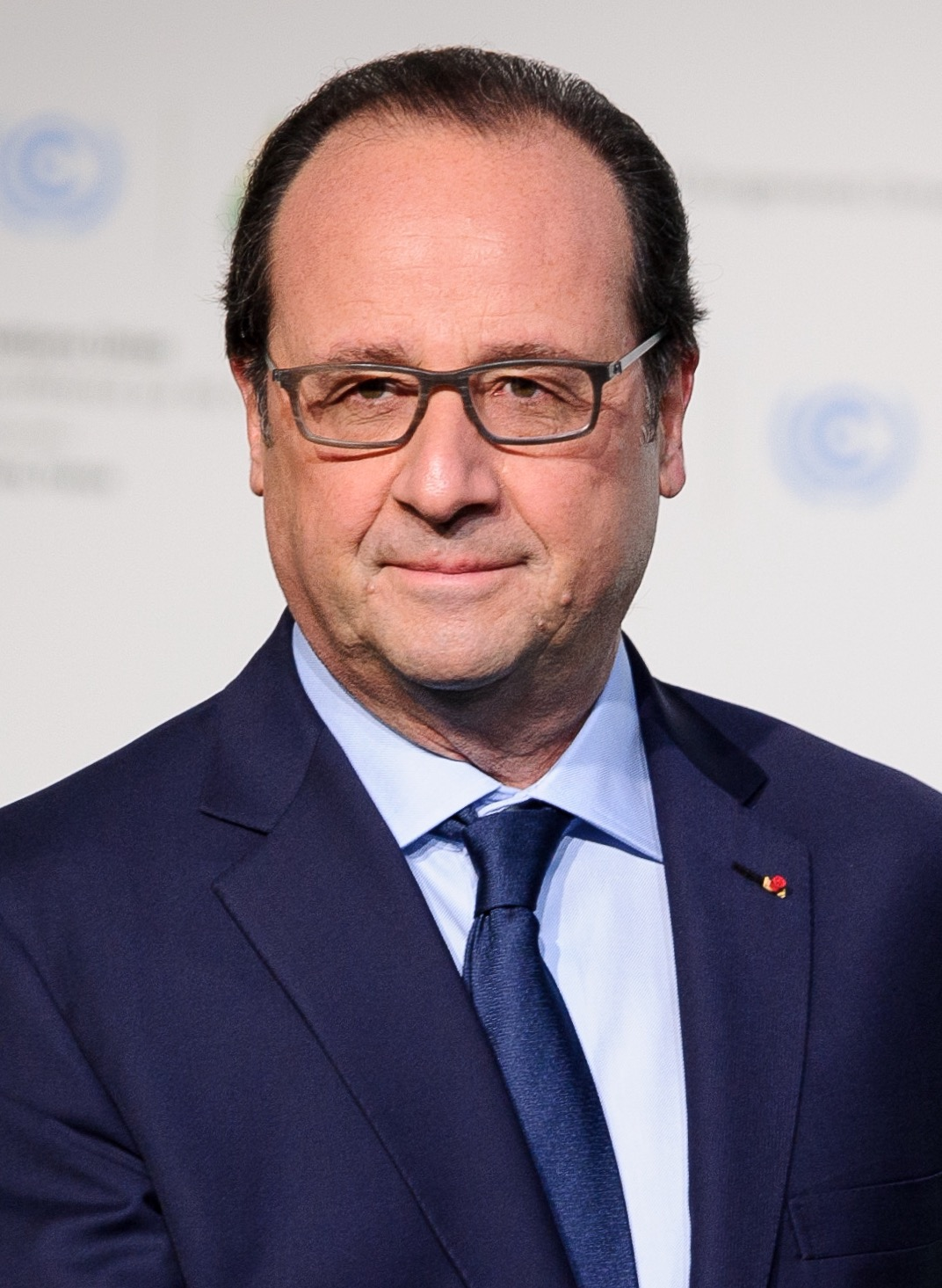
François Hollande

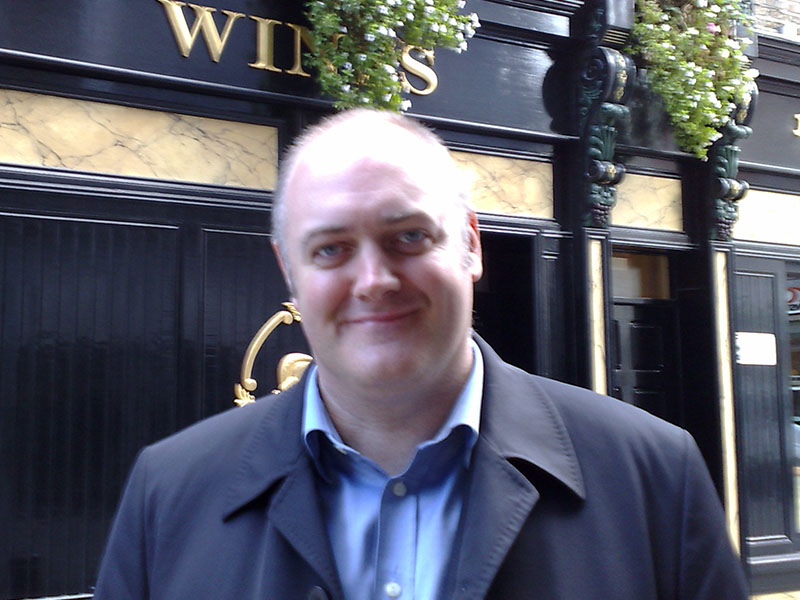
Dara Ó Briain

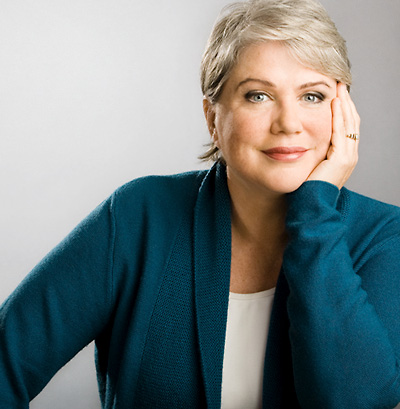
Julia Sweeney

This section contains people who rejected Catholicism in favor of a non-religious philosophy, including atheism, agnosticism and secular humanism.

- Alex Agnew, Belgian comedian and musician
- Steve Allen, American actor, TV show host, comedian, writer, musician (secular humanist and scientific skeptic)
- Javier Bardem, Spanish actor
- Floris van den Berg, Dutch philosopher and writer
- Paul Bettany, British actor
- Mike Birbiglia, American comedian, writer, actor, and director
- Christopher Buckley, political satirist
- Ed Byrne, Irish stand-up comedian
- George Carlin, American stand-up comedian
- Antonio Carluccio, Italian chef, restaurateur and food expert
- Jimmy Carr, British comedian
- Jim Carroll, American poet, diarist and musician
- George Clooney, American actor (agnostic)
- Pat Condell, British comedian
- Billy Connolly, Scottish stand-up comedian
- Marie Curie, Nobel laureate in chemistry and physics
- Guillermo del Toro, Mexican film director
- Amanda Donohoe, British actress
- Klaas Dijkhoff, Dutch politician
- Theodore Dreiser, American writer (Socialism and possibly Christian Science)
- Roger Ebert, American journalist, film critic and screenwriter
- Brian Eno, British musician and record producer
- Siobhan Fahey, British musician, member of Bananarama, now interested in spiritualism
- Nick Frost, British actor, comedian and screenwriter
- Janeane Garofalo, American comedian (Freethought advocate).
- William Jay Gaynor, politician and judge who became the 94th mayor of New York City. raised Catholic and briefly attended Christian Brothers seminary. Lost belief in organized religion and became an agnostic.
- Éamon Gilmore, Tánaiste (Deputy Prime Minister) of Ireland (2011–2017)
- Judy Greer, actress, raised Catholic but stated in 2014 that she was no longer a Catholic
- Kathy Griffin, American comedian and actress
- James Gunn, American film director and screenwriter for Guardians of the Galaxy who abandoned his Catholicism at the age of 11.
- Greg Gutfeld, American television personality
- Amber Heard, American actress
- Joe Higgins, Socialist Party Member of the European Parliament for Dublin, Ireland
- François Hollande, 24th President of France
- Anton van Hooff, Dutch classical historian and columnist
- Anthony Jeselnik, American stand-up comedian and television writer
- Katastroof, Belgian musical band consisting of "Jos Smos", "Zjuul Krapuul" and "Stef Bef" (pseudonyms) who had been singing songs critical of religion for over 30 years before deciding to "debaptise" themselves from the Catholic Church in 2010, and writing an "Ontdopingslieke" ("Debaptism Song") to urge others to do the same. They did this after a series Catholic Church sexual abuse cases of children around the world came to light.
- Denis Leary, American actor
- John Lydon, British musician, singer for The Sex Pistols and Public Image Ltd.
- Joseph Ma Ying-jeou, 6th president of Taiwan (Republic of China), raised Catholic had a baptismal name "Joseph", but later identified himself as a "multifaith" individual. Ma often worship Taiwanese folk deities when there is some need to the election.
- Seth MacFarlane, writer, creator, producer for Family Guy, American Dad, etc.
- James McAvoy, Scottish actor
- Barry McGowan, American author and Atheist leader
- Pauline McLynn, Irish character actress and author
- Bill Maher, American comedian and television personality
- Zoran Milanović, Prime Minister of Croatia (2011–2016) and 5th President of Croatia (2020–)
- Roh Moo-hyun, 16th President of South Korea
- Mandy Moore, American singer-songwriter and actress
- Giorgio Napolitano, 11th President of Italy
- Dara Ó Briain, Irish stand-up comedian and television presenter
- Joyce Carol Oates, author, critic (atheist)
- Conor Oberst, American singer-songwriter
- Bob Odenkirk, American actor and comedian; stated on his Twitter
- Ronald Plasterk, Dutch professor of microbiology and Minister of Education and Domestic Affairs
- Park Chan-wook, South Korean film director
- Ivica Puljak, Croatian sciencist and politician
- Joe Rogan, American sports commentator and stand-up comedian (agnostic)
- Chris Rush, American comedian who considers himself spiritual rather than religious
- Dan Savage, author
- Andy Serkis, British actor
- Omar Sharif, actor and bridge player; an Egyptian Melkite Catholic who converted to Islam, later became an atheist
- Aziz Shavershian, Australian bodybuilder and internet celebrity.
- Britney Spears, American singer and dancer. Previously a Catholic convert
- Julius Streicher, Nazi official.
- Julia Sweeney, atheist comedian on the advisory board of the Secular Coalition for America
- Janez Stanovnik, Slovenian resistance fighter and politician
- Laurie Taylor (sociologist)
- Josip Broz Tito, Yugoslav political leader
- Rob Trip, Dutch television and radio presenter, calls himself a "cultural Catholic, (...) but I'm not religious at all. Not Catholic and not believing."
- Jerome Tuccille, author of Heretic: Confessions of an Ex-Catholic Rebel
- Peter van der Vorst, Dutch television presenter and producer
- Dana White, first and current president of UFC
- Robert Anton Wilson, American author, philosopher, novelist, essayist and polymath (agnostic)
- Terry Wogan, Irish and British radio personality
- Željko Komšić, Croat member of the Bosnian presidency

== See also ==
- List of former Catholic priests
- List of former atheists and agnostics
- List of former Christians
  - List of former Protestants
  - List of former or dissident Mormons
- List of former Muslims
- List of people excommunicated by the Catholic Church
- List of people who converted to Catholicism
