= List of former atheists and agnostics =

For lists of atheists who converted to Christianity, Islam, or Judaism see the following links:

- List of converts to Islam from nontheism
- List of converts to Judaism from non-religious backgrounds

All other former atheists and agnostics that have been listed so far are below.

== Former atheists ==
=== Atheists who converted to Hinduism ===
- John Dobson - became a believer in Vedanta – astronomer and telescope designer
- Sita Ram Goel - Indian commentator, writer and Hindu activist

=== Atheists who became an unspecified/uncertain form of theism or deism ===
- Eben Alexander - neurosurgeon, author, teaching physician. Author of Proof of Heaven: A Neurosurgeon's Journey into the Afterlife
- Plutarco Elías Calles former president of Mexico who was an atheist but became a spiritist later in life
- Gabrielle Carey - Australian co-author of Puberty Blues who was raised atheist but converted to Catholicism and then explored other theologies.
- Antony Flew - philosopher and respected atheist thinker of the 20th century, became a deist.
- Moses Hess - Socialist philosopher and Left Hegelian who first influenced Karl Marx in his criticism of religion, but who later tried to combine the pantheism of Baruch Spinoza with Hegelianism.
- Jordan Peterson - Canadian clinical psychologist, former atheist and former materialist, ambiguous beliefs
- William Luther Pierce - American white supremacist and political activist who created Cosmotheism
- Anne Rice - best-selling American author of Gothic and religious-themed books. She returned to Catholicism, and remained as such for many years, but has since announced that although she still believes in God and in Christ she no longer considers herself a Christian.
- Allan Sandage - Astronomer known as the Father of Observational Cosmology discovered the universe was not cyclical and therefore the Big Bang was a one-time event which persuaded him that God existed. He later became a Christian.
- J. Neil Schulman - Libertarian science fiction writer who states he met, or experienced, God and that this ended his atheism. The first such experience would have occurred when he was 35. That stated he remains skeptical of "the church" and does not belong to any religion.
- Dave Sim - comics writer and anti-feminist. He converted to, or created, his own mixture of Abrahamic religions.
- Ted Turner - media mogul who stated that he is no longer an atheist or an agnostic. He has not embraced any specific religion.
- Mark Zuckerberg - Facebook founder and philanthropist

== See also ==
- List of atheists
- List of converts to nontheism
- Lists of former Christians
  - List of former Catholics
  - List of former Protestants
  - List of former or dissident LDS
- List of former Jews
- List of former Muslims
