= List of former Protestants =

Former Protestants or ex-Protestants are people who used to be Protestant for some time, but no longer identify as such. This is a list of people who were, but no longer are, followers of Protestant churches. It is organized by what church they left; when applicable, the religion they joined is mentioned. As implied it is limited to those who left Protestantism for a non-Protestant faith and so does not include those who switched from one Protestant denomination to another.

== Baptists ==
- William Marrion Branham – former Baptist minister, became a Pentecostal, but later became a non-denominational Christian Evangelist and preacher.
- Ahuva Gray – former Baptist minister, who converted to Orthodox Judaism.
- Keith Ham (a.k.a. Swami Kirtanananda; 1937–) – son of a fundamentalist Baptist pastor, Ham met ISKCON founding guru A.C. Bhaktivedanta Swami Prabhupada in New York City in 1966. After Prabhupada's death, Ham assumed leadership of ISKCON, claiming to be the sole successor to Prabhupada. He was later expelled after various criminal charges were brought against him.
- Carolivia Herron – author, convert to Judaism.
- Belinda Carlisle – lead singer of the Go-Go's, raised as Southern Baptist and converted to Buddhism.
- H. P. Lovecraft – fantasy-horror writer who rejected the practice as a teenager, and became an atheist.
- Gene Roddenberry – television producer and creator of Star Trek. Raised Southern Baptist, denounced his former faith and became a secular humanist.
- Andre Tippett – NFL player, who converted to Judaism.

== Calvinists ==
- Wojciech Bobowski, born in the 1600s and raised as a Protestant Calvinist possibly in Bobowa, a city within the Polish–Lithuanian Commonwealth (although some sources cite him as being from Lviv, itself also part of the Polish–Lithuanian Commonwealth at the time of his birth), was captured as a young adult by slavers and sold into slavery in the Ottoman Empire. While enslaved, Bobowski converted to Sunni Islam, and engaged in ecumenical activities, such as translating the complete Bible, fourteen psalms from the Genevan Psalter, the Anglican Catechism, and the works of the Protestant Reformers Hugo Grotius and John Amos Comenius into Ottoman Turkish.
- Adam Neuser, a Calvinist pastor originally from Gunzenhausen in the Duchy of Bavaria, itself a part of the Holy Roman Empire. He gained notoriety as the presiding priest of the Protestant congregation of the Church of the Holy Spirit in Heidelberg, the Palatinate (also within the Holy Roman Empire). As a consequence of a time of transition within the Calvinist Church in the late 1560s, Neuser joined a faction within the Church known as the Antidisciplinists, led by the Swiss physician and theologian, Thomas Lüber (Erastus). As a part of the Antidisciplinists, Neuser began to doubt standard Calvinist theology, especially the concept of the Trinity. He became an apologetic of Antitrinitarianism, writing a series of letters criticising the doctrine of the Trinity. Neuser even went so far as to write to the Ottoman Sultan Selim II where he maintained that should the Ottomans ever push their empire as far northwest as Germany, he would find support from its inhabitants, persecuted by the hyper-Catholic Habsburgs. The Palatinate Court found him guilty of blasphemy by denying the Divinity of Christ, and he was subsequently imprisoned. However, Neuser not only managed to escape with the help of his friend and fellow theologian Simon Grynaeus, but he was also able to make his way to the Ottoman Empire. After arriving in Constantinople, Neuser recited the Shahada and thus converted to Sunni Islam. Neuser eventually became a government official of the Ottoman Empire at the behest of the Sultan.
- Matthias Vehe, a contemporary of Adam Neuser and also an Antidisciplinist. He converted to a kind of Judaism called after also becoming an Antitrinitarian like Neuser.
- Claude Dalenberg, raised in Dutch Reformed Church community, met Shunryū Suzuki and converted to Buddhism, eventually becoming a senior priest at the San Francisco Zen Center.

== Evangelicals ==
- William G. Dever, Biblical archaeologist and former Evangelical minister who became a world-renowned Old Testament scholar and converted to Reform Judaism, although he says he no longer believes in God.
- Peter E. Gillquist, former regional director for Campus Crusade for Christ, converted to Eastern Orthodoxy. The initial impulse was his attempt to re-establish primitive Christianity, a faith formation which would go back to the very beginnings of the church. Researching the historical foundation of the faith, Gillquist with his colleagues concluded that Eastern Orthodox Church is that very unchanged, historical Christian formation they had sought. He organized the Evangelical Orthodox Church (EOC) in 1979, and in 1987 Gillquist led seventeen parishes with 2,000 members into Eastern Orthodoxy.
- Alfred Bloom, a professor of Religion and was raised as Evangelical Christian, was promoting Evangelical Christianity when encountered the concept of Amida Buddha and eventually converted to Buddhism. He was also a pioneer of Jōdo Shinshū studies in the English-speaking world.

== Lutherans ==
- Louis Bouyer – Lutheran pastor who converted to Catholicism.
- Ole Brunell – Lutheran pastor who converted to Orthodox Judaism.
- Christina of Sweden – Swedish queen-regent who converted to Catholicism.
- St. Elizabeth the New Martyr – Princess Elisabeth of Hesse and by Rhine, later Grand Duchess Elizabeth Feodorovna of Russia, converted to Orthodox Christianity from her native Lutheranism. Following the assassination of her husband in 1905, Elizabeth took monastic vows, opened the Convent of Saints Martha and Mary, and became its abbess. In 1918, Elizabeth was murdered by the Cheka Soviet secret police during the Russian Revolution. She was canonised by the Russian Orthodox Church Outside Russia in 1981 and in 1992 by the Moscow Patriarchate as New Martyr Elizabeth Feodorovna.
- Richard John Neuhaus – Lutheran pastor who converted to Catholicism.
- Jaroslav Pelikan – Lutheran historian who deemed his conversion to the Orthodox Church in America to be a "return."
- Arnold Schoenberg – Austrian and later American composer, associated with the expressionist movement in German poetry and art, and leader of the Second Viennese School. Born as a Jew he converted to Lutheranism for mainly cultural reasons only to later re-embrace Judaism.
- Johann Peter Spaeth – raised Roman Catholic, later converted to Lutheranism, and became a Lutheran theologian, he later left Christianity entirely and embraced Judaism.
- Ola Tjørhom – Norwegian theologian, converted to Catholicism.
- Sigrid Undset – convert to Catholicism.
- Wilhelm Volk – convert to Catholicism.
- Ajahn Viradhammo (Vitauts Akers) – convert to Buddhism and senior western disciple of Ajahn Chah, also the founder & abbot of Tisarana Buddhist Monastery.

== Methodists ==
- Sam Brownback – converted to Catholicism
- Richard Gere – American actor and producer, converted to Buddhism and co-founder of Tibet House US
- Kate Capshaw – converted to Judaism
- Isla Fisher – Australian actress and author, convert to Judaism
- Capers Funnye – converted to Judaism; he is the first African-American member of the Chicago Board of Rabbis, serves on the boards of the Jewish Council on Urban Affairs and the American Jewish Congress of the Midwest, and is active in the Institute for Jewish and Community Research; he is also the cousin of Michelle Obama
- John P. Greene – Methodist minister who joined the Latter Day Saint movement and became a Council of Fifty member.
- Julius Lester – son of a Methodist minister, and famous author who converted to Judaism.
- Arnold Lunn – son of minister Henry Simpson Lunn, who converted to Catholicism after initial opposition to that religion.
- Margaret Noble (1867–1911) – daughter of a minister of the Wesleyan Church in North Ireland (a branch of Methodism), she was a fervent Christian as a child, desiring to become a missionary to India. In 1895, Noble met Swami Vivekananda in London, converted to his version of Hinduism and was renamed "Sister Nivedita." Moved to India where she worked for nationalist causes and wrote several books, most notably, Kali The Mother.
- Asher Wade – ex-Methodist pastor; he converted in 1978 to Orthodox Judaism after studying the history of the holocaust.
- Earl Williams – American basketball player; converted to Judaism

== Pentecostals ==
- Duane Pederson – leader in the Jesus movement who joined an Eastern Orthodox Church.
- Yahweh ben Yahweh – founder of the Nation of Yahweh.

== Presbyterians ==
- A. George Baker – American Presbyterian, and later Episcopalian, minister who converted to Islam
- Scott Hahn – former minister who became a Catholic apologist.
- Elihu Palmer – American Revolution–era minister who became a freethinking deist philosopher and public speaker.
- Frank Schaeffer – son of Calvinist theologian and social critic Francis Schaeffer who converted to Eastern Orthodox Christianity and then to functional Atheism.
- Seungsahn Haengwon – son of Korean Presbyterian couple, converted to Buddhism and became a Buddhist monk, later founded the international Kwan Um School of Zen.
- David N. Weiss – former Presbyterian minister David Weiss (born in a secular Jewish household) returned to Judaism and is now a successful screenwriter living in Los Angeles. He has been the screenwriter for several films, including Shrek 2, Clockstoppers, Jimmy Neutron: Boy Genius, and Rugrats in Paris: The Movie. He has also been the screenwriter for some TV series.

== Anglicans ==
- Solomon Bandaranaike, fourth Prime Minister of Ceylon, converted to Buddhism
- Don Stephen Senanayake, first Prime Minister of Ceylon, converted to Buddhism
- J. R. Jayewardene, second President of Sri Lanka, converted to Buddhism

== See also ==
- List of former atheists and agnostics
- Lists of former Christians
  - List of former Catholics
  - List of former or dissident Mormons
- List of former Jews
- List of former Muslims
