= Debattista =

Debattista is a surname of Maltese origin.

== People with the surname ==
- Deo Debattista, Maltese MP (since 2013)
- Lolly Debattista (1929–2021), Maltese footballer

== See also ==
- Debaptism
