= Lists of former Christians =

Former Christians or ex-Christians are people who were Christians, but subsequently left Christianity.

The following is largely a link to lists of notable people who left Christianity, sorted by the religious or non-religious ideology they switched to:

== By former Christian denomination ==
- List of former Catholics
- List of former or dissident LDS (Mormons)
- List of former Protestants

== By newly adopted religion or irreligion ==
- List of Converts to Islam from Christianity
- List of converts to the Bahá'í Faith from Christianity
- List of converts to Buddhism from Christianity
- List of converts to Hinduism from Christianity
- List of converts to Judaism from Christianity
- List of converts to nontheism from Christianity

== Miscellaneous ==
This section is due to the existence of former Christians who do not fit existing lists of former Christians, either because their current faith is indeterminate or is not dealt with by the above lists.

- Brigitte Boisselier – mostly known for her association with Clonaid, converted to Raëlism
- Bart Campolo – former pastor and son of pastor Tony Campolo; as he is described as "secular humanist" he may fit the nontheist list, but has not precisely stated his view of theism
- Tom Cruise – American actor and well-known Scientologist
- Jenna Elfman – American actress who converted to Scientology
- Katy Perry – musician with five platinum records, daughter of Pentecostal pastors
- Charles M. Schulz – taught Sunday School at one time, but later identified as Secular humanist, although his widow indicates he maintained a belief in God.
- John Travolta – actor raised Catholic who converted to Scientology
- Neville Wadia – Anglo-Indian businessman of an old Parsi family, but raised Christian before converting to his ancestors' Zoroastrianism; this caused some controversy as orthodox Parsee clergy do not believe in converting to Zoroastrianism

== See also ==
- Apostasy in Christianity
- List of converts to Christianity
