= Omnium in mentem =

2009 motu proprio of Pope Benedict XVI

Omnium in mentem (To everyone's attention) is the incipit of a motu proprio of 26 October 2009, published on 15 December of the same year, by which Pope Benedict XVI modified five canons of the 1983 Code of Canon Law, two concerning the sacrament of holy orders, the other three being related to the sacrament of marriage.

== Canons on holy orders ==
The previous text of canon 1008 was: "By divine institution some among Christ's faithful are, through the sacrament of order, marked with an indelible character and are thus constituted sacred ministers; thereby they are consecrated and deputed so that, each according to his own grade, they fulfil, in the person of Christ the Head, the offices of teaching, sanctifying and ruling, and so they nourish the people of God."

This seemed to attribute to deacons as well as to priests (bishops and presbyters) the function of acting "in the person of Christ", the Head of the Church. No such ambiguity was found in the Code of Canons of the Eastern Churches.

The concluding words of canon 1008 were therefore revised to read more generically: "... so that, each according to his own grade, they serve the People of God with a new and specific title".

The motu proprio specified the distinct forms of serving the people of God exercised by deacons and priests by adding to the following canon 1009 a third paragraph:

"§3. Those who are constituted in the order of episcopate or presbyterate receive the office and faculty of acting in the person of Christ the Head, while deacons receive the power to serve the people of God in the diaconia of liturgy, word and charity."

== Canons connected with marriage ==
The change in the other three canons consisted in the elimination of the clause "and has not by a formal act defected from it" (nec actu formali ab ea defecerit) from the following canons:

1086 §1 "A marriage is invalid when one of the two persons was baptised in the catholic Church or received into it and has not by a formal act defected from it, and the other was not baptised."

1117 "The form prescribed above is to be observed if at least one of the parties contracting marriage was baptised in the catholic Church or received into it and has not by a formal act defected from it, without prejudice to the provisions of can. 1127 §2."

1124 "Without the express permission of the competent authority, marriage is prohibited between two baptised persons, one of whom was baptised in the catholic Church or received into it after baptism and has not defected from it by a formal act, the other of whom belongs to a Church or ecclesial community not in full communion with the catholic Church."

What is meant by the phrase "defected from it (the catholic Church) by a formal act" (not just de facto) was spelled out in a notification from the Pontifical Council for Legislative Texts on 13 March 2006. On the precise meaning of the phrase, see the article Actus formalis defectionis ab Ecclesia catholica.

From the entry into force of the 1983 Code of Canon Law until the entry into force of the motu proprio Omnium in mentem, a marriage contracted in violation of any of these canons by a Catholic who had made a formal act of defection from the Church was considered valid in the eyes of the Church, whether that person was or was not reconciled with the Church, since the canons explicitly exempted such persons from their provisions. The motu proprio removed that exemption, so that a person who, for instance, after the entry into force of the motu proprio, contracts a merely civil marriage after formally defecting from the Church but who is later reconciled to the Church is considered free, in the eyes of the Church, to marry someone else in the Church.
