= J. Regina Hyland =

American non-fiction and philosophical author (1933-2007)

- Born: Janet Regina Hyland; November 30, 1933
- Died: October 9, 2007 (aged 73)
- Occupation: Author
- Spouse: Glen Edward
- Writing career
- Genre: Non-fiction
- Subject: Philosophy

Janet Regina Hyland (November 30, 1933 – October 9, 2007), also known as "J. R. Hyland", was an American non-fiction and philosophical author.

== Personal life and family ==
Hyland courageously managed a very difficult childhood, filled with dramatic events. Hyland's parents divorced and both remarried during the 1940s. Her brother Don died of meningitis in June 1943. She said she was never close to her father, whom she described as an idealistic journalist in New York City, who "cared for no one and did nothing for anyone." However, she did grow close to her stepmother, Mildred, though she described her as both "self-centered and narcissistic."

Mildred died during the early 1960s, her father during the early 1970s, and her natural mother during the late 1980s.

Hyland and her stepsister Jean lived together during the 1970s and then lived near each other from 1985 to Hyland's death in 2007. However, Hyland said they didn't become close until 1995, when she founded Viatoris Ministries and the Humane Religion bimonthly.

Regina was married to Glen Edward on July 2, 1954. On August 9, 1954, Glen was hit by a drunk driver. Glen remained in a coma for a year and then in a "persistent vegetative state" for seven more years before dying. Hyland never remarried.

During her life, Hyland suffered from several health ailments. In 1957, she was found to have an ovarian tumor. She was in and out of hospitals from 1961-63. In 2007, Hyland was scheduled to appear at the SFVS World Vegetarian Weekend Festival in San Francisco, when she suddenly fell ill. She died of complications from breast cancer three weeks later, on Tuesday, October 9, 2007.

== Education and military service ==
Hyland was raised Roman Catholic and attended Catholic school as a child. As a young woman, she served in the United States Air Force, and joined the Assemblies of God because she sought ordination. Her undergraduate and graduate work at an Assemblies of God Seminary were in religious studies. She began seminary studies in biblical theology in 1955-58, but didn't complete a Masters in Theology until the 1980s. Beginning again in 1982, she studied with the Assembly of God Home Missions, and was ordained by them on November 24, 1984.

== Professional career ==
J. Regina Hyland became vegetarian for ethical reasons around 1973, after witnessing brutal animal experiments in a college laboratory. Hyland believed that God created animals to be human companions and often cooperated with PETA and other animal rights groups. She maintained the philosophy that one's diet is a personal choice and did not condone forcing that opinion on others. She believed that "just as Western culture used the Bible to denigrate women, to prolong slavery, and to justify war, the Scriptures have been used to terrorize animals."

According to Sue Grisham, who authored the article, "Advocates for Animals," for an October 2002 edition of the Episcopalian publication, The Living Church, Rev. Hyland and others during her time of advocacy for animals "indicate[d] that Jesus' last (intentionally public) action before his arrest was to disrupt the trade of animals being sold for the slaughter worship at Passover."

Hyland began her career by writing evangelical Sunday school literature. In 1988, she wrote The Slaughter Of Terrified Beasts: A Biblical Basis for the Humane Treatment of Animals, which was later republished as God's Covenant With Animals: A Biblical Basis for the Humane Treatment of Animals (2000). In 1995, she founded Viatoris Ministries, a pro-animal vegetarian Christian parachurch resource ministry in Sarasota, Florida. Viatoris published a bimonthly magazine, Humane Religion, written by Hyland. At its peak, Humane Religion had 3,500 paid subscribers, with hundreds of free copies being distributed to churches. In 1998, the publication was suspended due to increasing postage costs. It later returned as a free online publication.

Hyland also published Sexism is a Sin shortly after founding Viatoris.

Hyland was willing to reach outside theological frameworks to engage individuals defining themselves as pro-life and others in constructive interfaith dialogue, however that intellectual engagement would be construed. She said she religiously read a copy of Bhagavad-Gītā As It Is. She also obtained a copy of Srila Prabhupada's book, The Path of Perfection, saying his teachings on yoga and meditation influenced her, despite what she perceived to be sexist comments about women.

During her career, Hyland was also involved in various parachurch organizations and was active in migrant worker and prison ministries.

== Health problems ==
Hyland suffered several health ailments. While her husband Glen was still in a coma in 1957, she was found to have an ovarian tumor. She described herself as having been "on the ropes" from 1961–63, i.e., in and out of hospitals.

Later on, during the 1970s, Hyland became vegetarian, but she found it odd that many religious groups that advocate vegetarianism, such as Jains, some Hindus and some Buddhists (including Assemblies of God and Seventh-day Adventists), frown on alcohol and other mind-altering substances as "carnal" or "unspiritual." However, according to Murthi, she admitted that her fondness for alcohol may have stemmed from her Irish Catholic upbringing. Until her death of breast cancer at just short of 74 years, she maintained that the Bible permits alcohol, though only in moderation. Despite continuing to claim Assemblies of God ordination throughout her later life, she was at odds with their teaching on this point.

== Final days ==
Regina Hyland had been scheduled to appear at the SFVS World Vegetarian Weekend Festival in San Francisco near the end of September 2007 (October 1 is World Vegetarian Day), when she suddenly fell ill. She lived three weeks longer and died on Tuesday, October 9, 2007. The Jennings Funeral Home & Crematory in Sarasota, Florida handled her funeral arrangements, including the performance of her cremation. She was survived by her sister Jean Burns.

According to Karen Davis, president of United Poultry Concerns, Rev. Hyland succumbed to complications from breast cancer.

== Theological view of vegetarianism ==
Hyland read the Bible as a story of the human failure to fulfill a Divinely-assigned role as compassionate caregiver for other species.

Her books speak to the goal of discovering during Bible reading a motivation to bring about changes in traditional Christian attitudes towards animals. She talked about the biblical teaching that both humans and animals are ""nefesh chaya," that is, beings who live because of the soul infused by their Creator.

Several religious vegetarians have written selectively about underlying themes in Hyland's viewpoints, but few or none have done a systematic treatment of her overall worldview. Ophthalmologist Dr. Stephen Kaufman of the Christian Vegetarian Association writes in one draft of his book, Good News for All Creation, of the Jungian dualism in Hyland's worldview:

As J.R. Hyland has noted, Jesus' ministry showed how a complete human being should manifest both archetypical male and female attributes. The 'male principle,' she has argued, involves action and overcoming. The 'female principle' features care-giving and concern. Though all people have innate desires to display degrees of both principles, cultures have often discouraged men from manifesting the 'female principle' and women from exhibiting the 'male principle.' However, action and overcoming without care-giving and concern easily leads to violence, and destructiveness, and care-giving and concern without action and overcoming does not prevent violence and destructiveness. Jesus repeatedly showed care-giving and nurturing in his dealings with his disciples, friends, and even strangers, while also displaying action and overcoming, such as his defense of the adulteress (John 8:3-11), his confrontation with the heartless scribes and Pharisees (Matthew 23:13-29; Luke 11:42-43), and his turning over the money-changers' tables in the Temple.

Other theological perspectives Theological Comparison with Other Christian Vegetarian Thinkers

Though a minority position historically, Christian vegetarian authors have connected Biblical texts with vegetarian and humane values. Hyland read the Bible as a story of the human failure to fulfill a Divinely-assigned role as compassionate caregiver for other species. While rejected ecumenically at the same time that the World Council of Churches was considering a statement "On the Celebration of Life" (later narrowly rejected), Hyland moved to write "The Slaughter Of Terrified Beasts: A Biblical Basis for the Humane Treatment of Animals," (published in 1988), revised and reissued in 2000 by Lantern Books, NYC, under the title "God's Covenant With Animals."

Her work speaks to the goal of discovering during Bible reading a motivation to bring about changes in traditional Christian attitudes towards animals, which traditionally has found enormous resistance on the part of religious functionaries, such as priests, ministers, and various church groups to the biblical teaching that both humans and animals are (in Hebrew) "nefesh chaya": beings who live because of the soul infused by their Creator.

Frances Arnetta (founder in the 1980s of CHAP, Christians Helping Animals and People, a more fundamentalist Christian animal rights group) condemns factory farming as "diabolical" and endorses vegetarianism as "God's best for all concerned," but she refuses to say one must be a vegetarian in order to be a good Christian. In contrast, Hyland plainly said of meat-eating, "It's a sin."

== Publications ==
In addition to articles in her periodical, Humane Religion, Hyland wrote a number of books about Christian duties towards animals and Creation:

- Sexism is a Sin: The Biblical Basis of Female Equality (1995) Sarasota, FL, Viatoris Ministries.
- Animal Rights: Contemporary Concern or Ongoing Issue?
- The Slaughter of Terrified Beasts: A Biblical Basis for the Humane Treatment of Animals (1988)
  - reissued in 2000 by Lantern Books under the title God's Covenant With Animals: A Biblical Basis for the Humane Treatment of All Creatures [New York: Lantern Books, 2000]
    PETA described this book as "a must-read for anyone hearing the Bible misused to justify animal cruelty."]

== See also ==
- Animal rights
- Christian Vegetarian Association
- Christian vegetarianism
- Vegetarianism and religion
- History of vegetarianism
- Ethics of eating meat
