= Miriam Byrne =

Scottish priest

Miriam Alexandra Frances Byrne is a priest of the Scottish Episcopal Church (SEC).

A former Roman Catholic nun, she was ordained in 1994 and was Priest in charge of St Augustine, Dumbarton before becoming the Provost of St Paul’s Cathedral, Dundee in the Diocese of Brechin; and thus the most senior female cleric in the SEC. She was suspended in 2000 over disputed liturgical decisions and administrative style but reinstated by the college of bishops and cleared of all charges. She successfully continued her ministry and established a thriving congregation. She also reinvigorated the cathedral finances with diverse business practices including the establishment of a successful day nursery.

In April 2006, she announced her resignation as provost and moved to France.
