= Ola Tjørhom =

Ola Tjørhom (born 1953 in Stavanger) is a Norwegian former Lutheran professor of theology who converted to Roman Catholicism on 25 January 2003. Formerly Tjørhom belonged to the Norwegian School of Mission and Theology in Stavanger and was active in ecumenical activities. Tjørhom's conversion has occasioned attention not only in his native country but also in the ecumenical movement all over the world.
