= Debaptism =

Procedure reversing Christian baptism

Debaptism is the practice of reversing a baptism. Most Christian churches see baptism as a once-in-a-lifetime event that can be neither repeated nor undone. They hold that those who have been baptized remain baptized, even if they renounce the Christian faith by adopting a non-Christian religion or by rejecting religion entirely. However, some organizations and individuals partake in the practice.

In addition to de facto renunciation through apostasy, or heresy, the Roman Catholic Church envisaged from 1983 to 2009 the possibility of formal defection from the Church through a decision manifested personally, consciously and freely, and in writing, to the competent church authority, who was then to judge whether it was genuinely a case of "true separation from the constitutive elements of the life of the Church … (by) an act of apostasy, heresy or schism." A formal defection of this kind was then noted in the register of the person's baptism, an annotation that, like those of marriage or ordination, was independent of the fact of the baptism and was not an actual "debaptism", even if the person who formally defected from the Catholic Church had also defected from the Christian religion. The fact of having been baptized remains a fact and the Catholic Church holds that baptism marks a person with a lasting seal or character that "is an ontological and permanent bond which is not lost by reason of any act or fact of defection." Nonetheless, formal requests for debaptisms are made; in France, a man sued the French Catholic church for "its refusal to let him nullify his baptism." He had been "un-baptized" in 2000, and ten years later he demanded to have his name stricken from the baptismal records, a request granted by a judge in Normandy, a decision appealed by the church.

One of the major legal questions regarding "de-baptism" is the question whether a baptismal record is a "registry" or a "database". If it is considered a registry, which is there to document an act that took place, regardless of what happens later, a legal argument can claim that it should not be revised or destroyed. Doing so may in fact not only revise history, but can also be considered illegal by secular law, just as other types of damaging important documents. The person was baptized, and the record should show it. On the other hand, if baptismal records are considered a database, that can and should be modified continuously to reflect the current reality, modifying the record, or even erasing it, can and maybe even should be done. The person does not belong to the Church anymore, and the document, or its destruction, should reflect that reality.

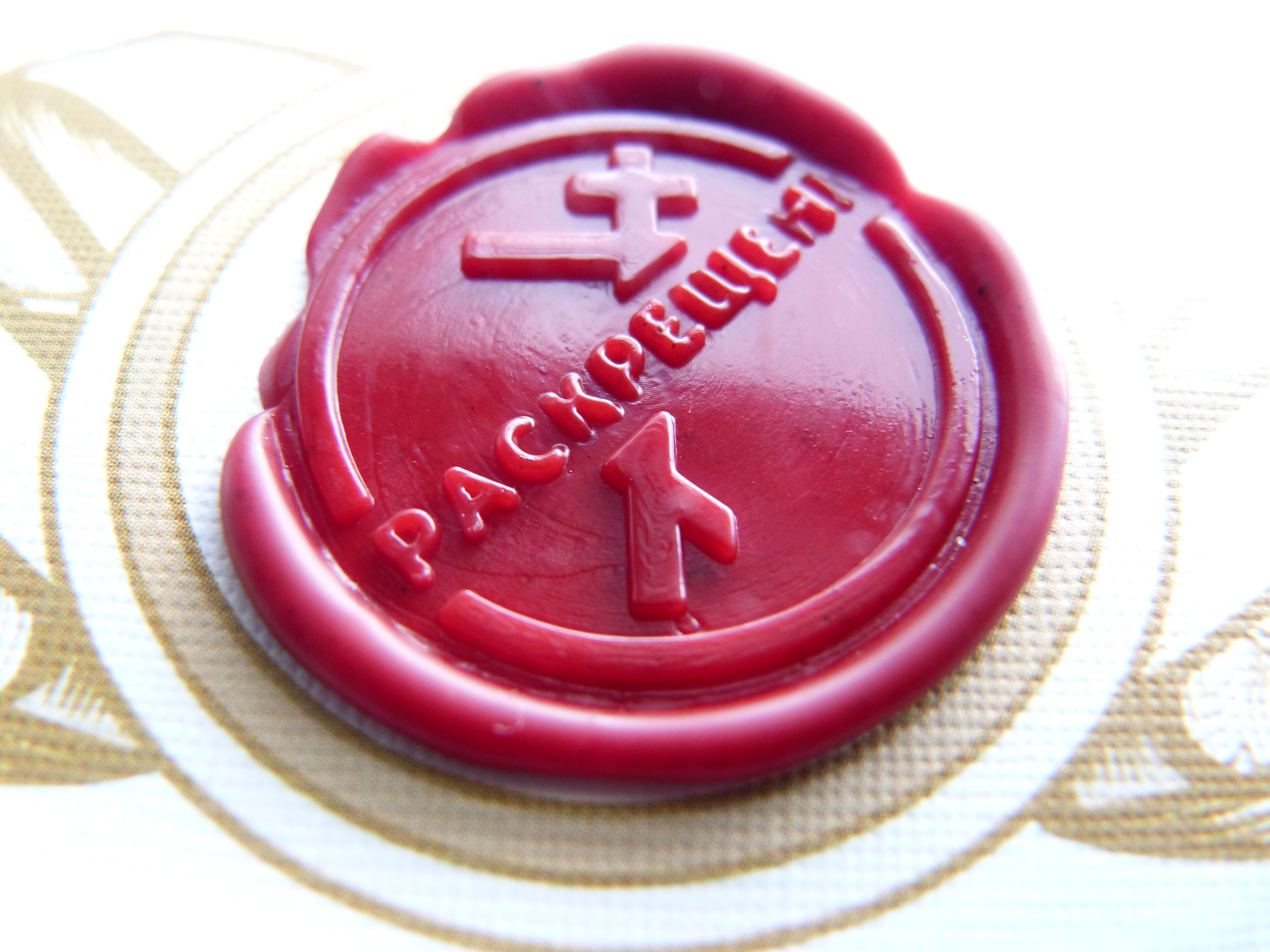
Wafer on a certificate of debaptism

Some atheist organizations, such as the Italian Union of Rationalist Atheists and Agnostics and the British National Secular Society are said to having offered certificates of "debaptism". Not even those who provide the certificates consider them as having legal or canonical effect. The Church of England refuses to take any action on presentation of the certificate. The Roman Catholic Church likewise treats it as any other act of renunciation of the Catholic faith, although for a few years, from 2006 to 2009, it did note in the baptismal register any formal act of defection from the Catholic Church, a concept quite distinct from that of presentation of such a certificate. In Italy, UAAR obtained in 1999 a decision of the Italian Data Protection Authority ordering that, upon request, the Catholic Church must annotate baptismal registers to indicate that a person does not wish to be considered a member of the Church, and must provide the requester with confirmation of that annotation.

Numerous Satanist organizations and collectives practice "Unbaptism Rituals" to reject the faith that they were raised in. There is no single Unbaptism Ritual adhered to by Satanists, as most organizations operate independently from one another. Notable organizations that offer Unbaptisms include The Satanic Temple and the Global Order of Satan.

In the years 2010 to 2016, 12,442 people "debaptised" in the Dutch-speaking Flemish region of Belgium by formally leaving the Catholic Church.

Resignation from The Church of Jesus Christ of Latter-day Saints results in a revocation of all church ordinances, including baptism.

Using a hair dryer, some atheist groups have conducted tongue-in-cheek "debaptism" ceremonies, not intended to be taken seriously.
