= List of converts to nontheism =

This list of converts to nontheism includes individuals who formerly identified with a religion but have rejected their former religion, becoming nontheist.

== Former Buddhists ==
Name	Country	Notes
Khorloogiin Choibalsan	Mongolia	Communist revolutionary, politician, and leader of Mongolia.
Mao Zedong	China	Communist revolutionary, politician and socio-political theorist and founding father of the People's Republic of China

== Former Christians ==
Name	Country	Notes
John Abraham	India	Bollywood actor born to a Zoroastrian mother and a Marthomite Syrian Christian father; left Christianity and became an agnostic atheist.
Amy Adams	United States	American actress; raised as a Mormon until her parents divorced in 1985 and left the church.
Sami Aldeeb	Switzerland	Swiss lawyer and author of many books and articles on Arab and Islamic law born to a Palestinian Christian family; left Christianity and became a nontheist.
Jacinda Ardern	New Zealand	Prime minister of New Zealand; raised Mormon, became agnostic.
Javier Bardem	Spain	Actor; raised Catholic, became an agnostic.
Dan Barker	United States	Former preacher turned atheist activist and co-president of the Freedom From Religion Foundation.
Ingmar Bergman	Sweden	Film director whose father was a parson; stated he lost his faith at age 8, but did not fully come to terms with that until making Winter Light.
Martin Bormann	Nazi Germany	Nazi official and right-hand man of Adolf Hitler; raised Protestant.
Bob Brown	Australia	Australian senator and former Parliamentary Leader of the Australian Greens.
Dan Brown	United States	American author, raised Episcopalian but gravitated away from religion.
Warren Buffett	United States	American business magnate, investor, and philanthropist, who is the chairman and CEO of Berkshire Hathaway. He is considered one of the most successful investors in the world and has a net worth of US$88.9 billion as of December 2019, making him the fourth-wealthiest person in the world. Was raised as a Presbyterian, but has since described himself as agnostic.
Bart Campolo	United States	Humanist chaplain and son of pastor Tony Campolo.
Fidel Castro	Cuba	Cuban communist revolutionary and politician; Prime Minister of Cuba (1959–1976), and President (1976–2008); baptized into the Roman Catholic Church at the age of eight; later became an atheist.
Nikolay Chernyshevsky	Russia	Revolutionary democrat, materialist philosopher, critic, and socialist.
Helen Clark	New Zealand	Prime Minister; raised Presbyterian, became an agnostic.
George Clooney	United States	Actor; raised Catholic, became an agnostic.
Pat Condell	United Kingdom	Writer, political commentator, comedian and atheist internet personality.
Marie Curie	Poland	Physicist and chemist; raised Catholic, became an agnostic.
Charles Darwin	United Kingdom	British naturalist, geologist and biologist, best known for his contributions to the science of evolution; raised as a Unitarian, later became an agnostic.
Richard Dawkins	United Kingdom	British ethologist, evolutionary biologist and author; was brought up as an Anglican until ceasing to believe in a deity in his teens, concluding that the theory of evolution was a better explanation for life's complexity.
Emily Deschanel	United States	American actress.
Jerry DeWitt	United States	Former pastor of two evangelical churches; publicly converted to atheism in 2011 after twenty-five years of Christian ministry. He has written a book based on his career and experiences entitled Hope After Faith.
Matt Dillahunty	United States	Public speaker, raised Southern Baptist, considered becoming a minister. His religious studies, instead of bolstering his faith as he intended, led him to no longer believe in Christianity and then all religions.
Julia Louis-Dreyfus	United States	American actress, raised Catholic.
Jonathan Edwards	United Kingdom	Former British triple jumper; former Olympic, Commonwealth, European and World champion; formerly a devout Christian, and even presented episodes of the BBC Christian worship programme Songs of Praise.
Adolf Eichmann	Nazi Germany	Nazi official; raised Protestant.
Anthony Fauci	United States	American physician-scientist and immunologist who served as the director of the U.S. National Institute of Allergy and Infectious Diseases (NIAID) and the chief medical advisor to the president, grew up Catholic, but then considered himself a humanist
Ricky Gervais	United Kingdom	Actor, abandoned Christianity at the age of eight.
Julia Gillard	Australia	Prime Minister; brought up in the Baptist faith, then became an atheist
Joseph Goebbels	Nazi Germany	Nazi propagandist; raised Catholic.
Mikhail Gorbachev	Soviet Union	Ruler of the USSR; baptized Russian Orthodox, became an atheist.
Judy Greer	United States	Actress, raised Catholic but stated in 2014 that she was no longer a Catholic.
E. A. Hanks	United States	Writer and journalist, was born again in her childhood, became an atheist as an adult.
Bob Hawke	Australia	Former politician who served as the 23rd Prime Minister of Australia from 1983 to 1991.
Hergé	Belgium	Comic strip artist, known for creating The Adventures of Tintin, raised Catholic, became agnostic
Francois Hollande	France	French president, was raised Catholic, but became an agnostic later in life. He now considers himself to be an atheist, but still professes respect for all religious practices.
Kim Il Sung	North Korea	North Korean leader, was raised in a Presbyterian family.
Abraham Kovoor	India	Indian professor and rationalist, noted for Abraham Kovoor's challenge.
Vladimir Lenin	Soviet Union	Russian revolutionary, then ruler of the Soviet Union; was baptized into Orthodox Christianity but later renounced his belief in God.
Glenn Loury	United States	American academic and scholar.
Emmanuel Macron	France	President of France, raised in a non-religious family, he was baptized a Roman Catholic at his own request at age 12.
Karl Marx	Germany	Philosopher; baptised into the Lutheran Church.
Joseph McCabe	United Kingdom	Ordained as "Father Antony", but left the Catholic priesthood and abandoned theism; then wrote The Totalitarian Church of Rome and stated that "Atheism will in this century be the common attitude of civilized people."
Jennette McCurdy	United States	American singer-songwriter, filmmaker, and former actress; was raised in The Church of Jesus Christ of Latter-day Saints, but left the religion in her early adulthood, citing fundamental disagreements with church doctrine.
François Mitterrand	France	President of France; his family was devoutly Catholic, became agnostic following an observation of Nazi concentration camps at the end of World War II.
Mandy Moore	United States	American singer-songwriter and actress; raised Catholic but has since stopped religion.
Benito Mussolini	Italy	Italian politician, journalist and leader of the National Fascist Party, ruling the country as Prime Minister from 1922 to his ousting in 1943.
Friedrich Nietzsche	Germany	German philosopher, poet, cultural critic and classical philologist.
Millosh Gjergj Nikolla	Albania	Albanian poet and writer; trained to be an Orthodox priest, but became an atheist.
Nathan Phelps	Canada	American Canadian author and LGBT rights activist; son of Fred Phelps.
Brad Pitt	United States	Actor; raised as a Southern Baptist.
Alfred Rosenberg	Nazi Germany	Leader of NSDAP Office of Foreign Affairs; raised Protestant.
Maikel Nabil Sanad	Egypt	Egyptian political activist, blogger, and a former political prisoner.
Michael Shermer	United States	American science writer, historian of science, founder of The Skeptics Society, and editor-in-chief of its magazine Skeptic.
Albert Speer	Nazi Germany	Nazi architect; raised Christian. Became an agnostic atheist.
Morgan Spurlock	United States	American documentary filmmaker, humorist, television producer, screenwriter and playwright, raised Methodist but became agnostic later in life.
Joseph Stalin	Soviet Union	Russian revolutionary, then ruler of the USSR; studied to be an Orthodox priest but became an atheist after reading Karl Marx's books.
Meryl Streep	United States	American actress.
Julius Streicher	Nazi Germany	Nazi official and founder of the antisemitic newspaper Der Stürmer; raised Catholic.
Chris Stuckmann	United States	American film critic, filmmaker and YouTuber; raised as a Jehovah's Witnesses, but abandoned the faith around 2011 and has since referred to himself as areligious.
Julia Sweeney	United States	American actress, comedian and author.
Charles Templeton	Canada	Co-founder of Youth for Christ; rejected Christianity for agnosticism after a struggle with doubts.
Josip Broz Tito	Yugoslavia	Leader of the Yugoslav Partisans (Europe's most effective anti-Nazi resistance movement); revolutionary and statesman; Roman Catholic who became an atheist.
Michael J. Totten	United States	American journalist and author.
Janet Varney	United States	American actress, raised Mormon, became agnostic.

== Former Hindus ==
- Kamal Haasan – despite being born into a Hindu Brahmin family, declared himself an atheist
- Goparaju Ramachandra Rao – Indian activist for atheism; wrote in We Become Atheists, "I was conventionally orthodox and superstitious in the days of my boyhood. I believed in the claims of divine revelations by my parental aunt."
- Ram Gopal Varma – born into a Hindu family; claimed himself atheist
- Vinayak Damodar Savarkar – president of Hindu Mahasabha; founder of the Hindutva movement; atheist; did not define "Hindutva" by religion, and used to publicly advertise lectures on atheism and the non-existence of God
- Shreela Flather, Baroness Flather of Windsor and Maidenhead – first Hindu woman in British politics; described herself as a "Hindu atheist"
- Rajeev Khandelwal – Indian film and television actor; states himself an atheist
- Doja Cat - American rapper and singer; born to an Ashkenazi Jewish mother and practiced Hinduism for 4 years.

== Former Jews ==
Name	Country	Notes
Jack Cohen	United Kingdom	Reproductive biologist; worked with science fiction writers; co-wrote books including Evolving the Alien; his grandfather was a rabbi; he attended synagogue for cultural reasons, but was an atheist
Émile Durkheim	France	Sociologist descended from a long line of rabbis; had an interest in religion as a social phenomenon; wrote The Elementary Forms of the Religious Life; was an agnostic by adulthood; besides an interest, he saw some value in religion, but stated, "We must discover the rational substitutes for these religious notions that for a long time have served as the vehicle for the most essential moral ideas."
Al Goldstein	United States	Pornographer; widely regarded as the father of Internet pornography
Rebecca Goldstein	United States	Novelist and professor of philosophy; born into an Orthodox Jewish family; has an older brother who is an Orthodox rabbi; in 2011 she was named AHA's Humanist of the Year, and is an atheist
Carlo Strenger	Switzerland	Swiss-Israeli psychologist who describes his transition from Orthodox Judaism to secular atheism as the defining experience of his life

== Former Muslims ==
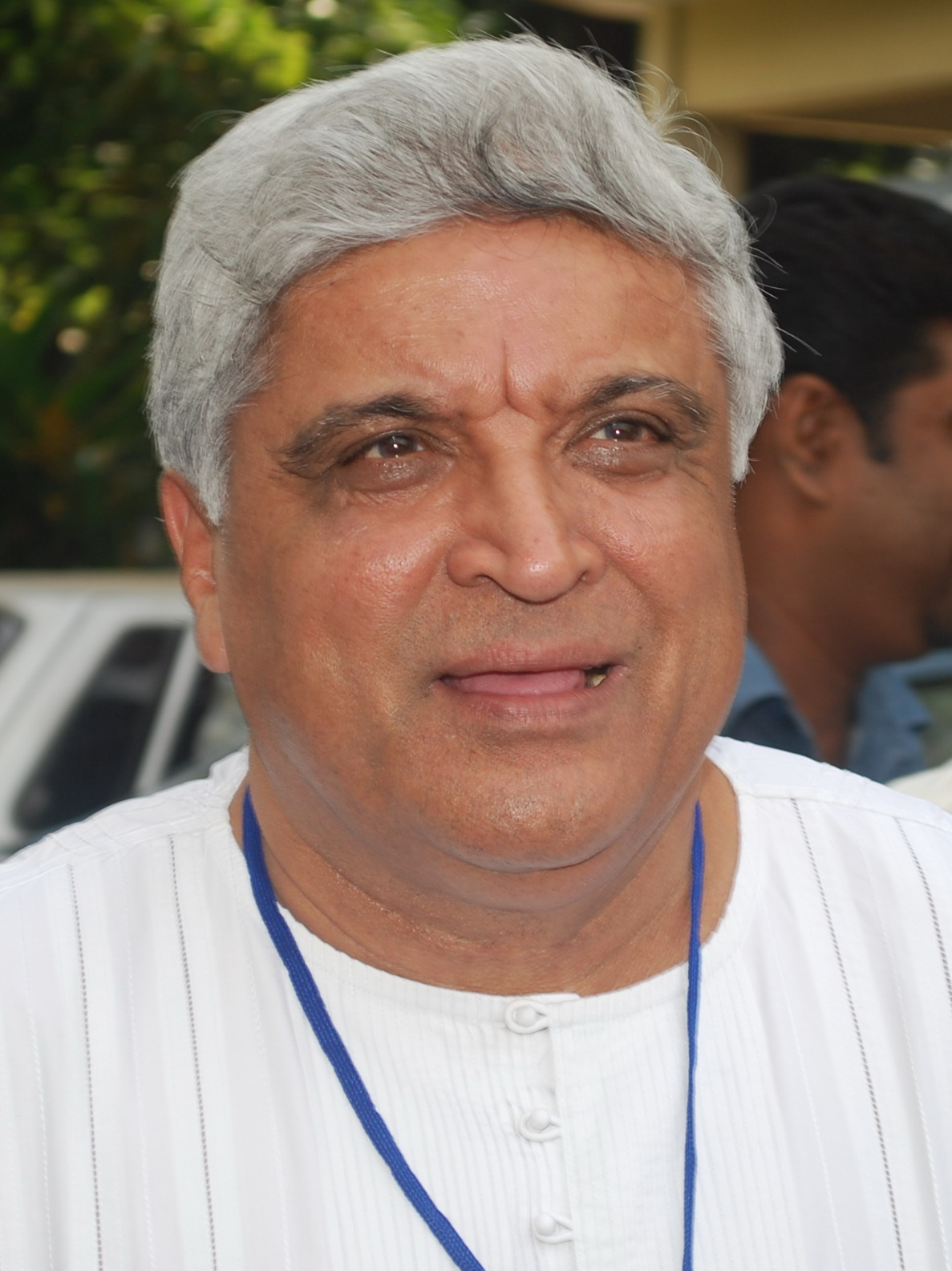
Javed Akhtar, Indian writer and lyricist

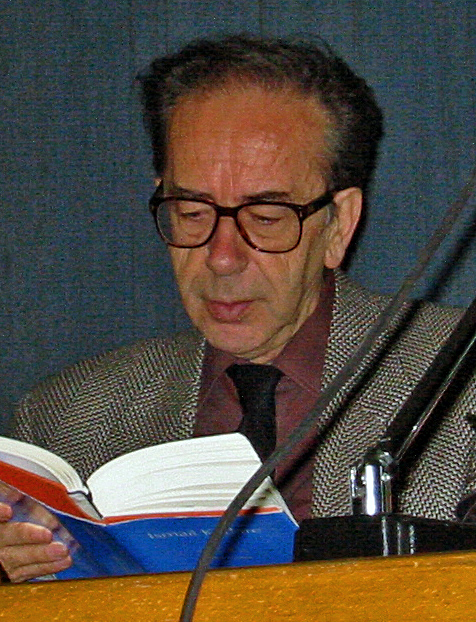
Ismail Kadare, Albanian writer

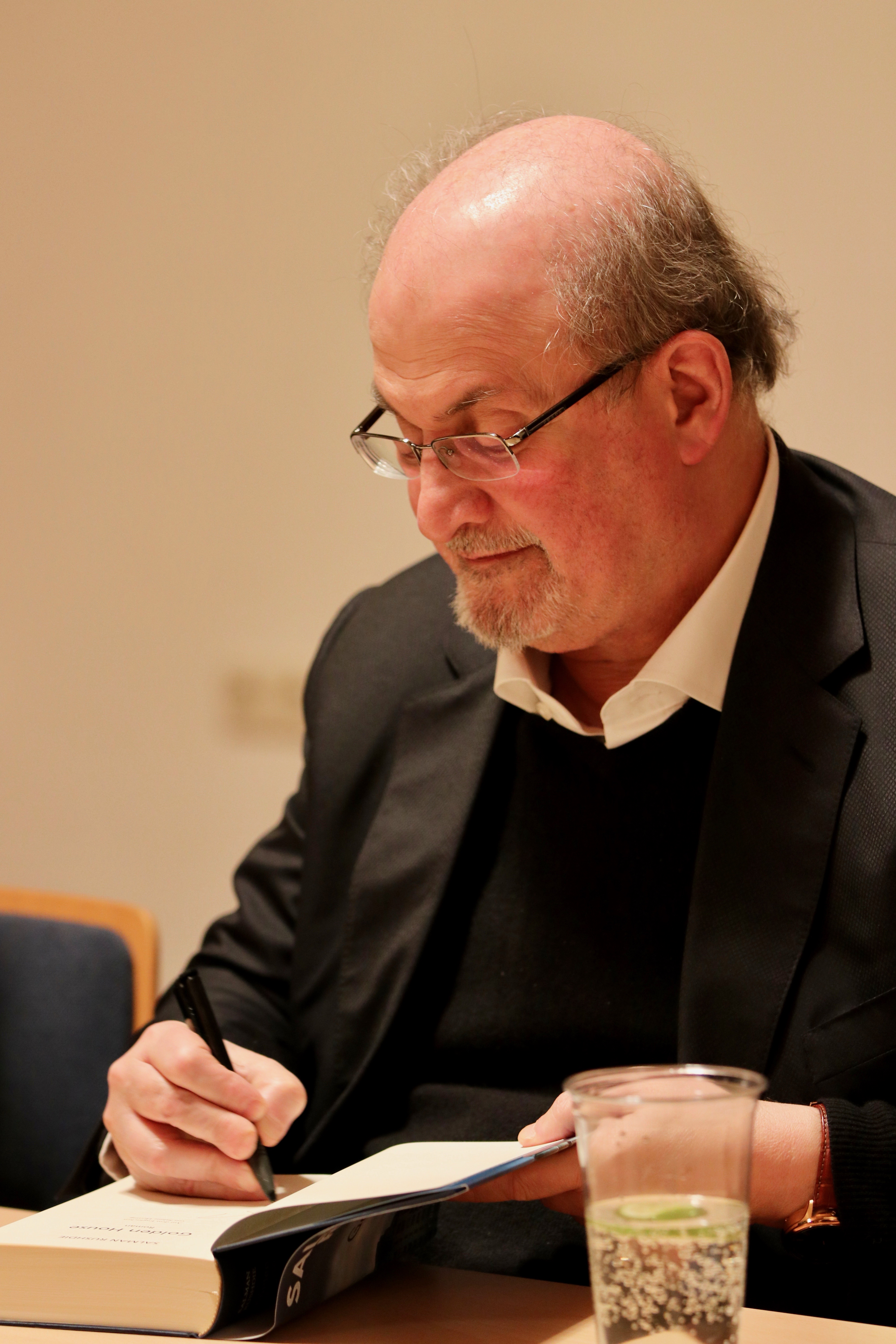
Salman Rushdie, author of The Satanic Verses

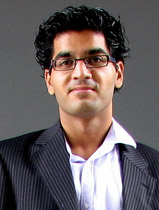
Former Muslim and Dutch politician Ehsan Jami; one of the two founders of the Central Committee for Ex-Muslims

- As'ad Abu Khalil – Lebanese professor of political science at California State University, Stanislaus; describes himself as an "atheist secularist"
- Zackie Achmat – South African anti-HIV/AIDS activist; founder of the Treatment Action Campaign
- Ismail Adham – Egyptian writer and philosopher
- Mina Ahadi – Iranian-born pacifist, founder of the German organization Central Council of Ex-Muslims
- Javed Akhtar – Indian writer, lyricist, TV show host, secular and nationalist activist
- Mirza Fatali Akhundov – 19th-century Azerbaijani playwright and philosopher
- Waleed Al-Husseini – Qalqilyan blogger, writer, secular humanist, and founder of the Council of Ex-Muslims of France
- Ramiz Alia – Albanian communist leader and former president of Albania
- Bisi Alimi – Nigerian gay rights activist based in the United Kingdom
- Kareem Amer – Egyptian blogger
- Mustafa Kemal Atatürk – Turkish field marshal, statesman, secularist reformer, and author; a deist or an atheist
- Humayun Azad – Bangladeshi author, poet, scholar and linguist
- Hassan Bahara – Moroccan-Dutch writer
- Pelin Batu – Turkish actress and television personality
- Hafid Bouazza – Moroccan-Dutch writer
- Parvin Darabi – Iranian-born American writer and women's rights activist
- Turan Dursun – Turkish author; was once a Turkish mufti; later authored many books critical of Islam
- Afshin Ellian – Iranian professor
- Enver Hoxha – Communist dictator who declared Albania the first atheist state
- Ismail Kadare – World-renowned Albanian writer
- Sarmad Kashani – 17th-century mystical poet and sufi saint; arrived from Persia to India; beheaded for assumed heresy by the Mughal emperor Aurangzeb; renounced Judaism, briefly converting to Islam and then Hinduism; later denounced all religions and rejected belief in God
- Raheem Kassam – British conservative activist
- Al-Ma'arri – blind Arab philosopher, poet and writer
- Lounès Matoub – Algerian Berber Kabyle singer and activist
- Asif Mohiuddin – Bangladeshi blogger and secularist
- Seema Mustafa – Indian journalist, political editor and Delhi Bureau Chief of The Asian Age newspaper
- Maryam Namazie – Iranian communist, political activist and leader of the British apostate-organization Council of Ex-Muslims of Britain
- Kumail Nanjiani – Pakistani American stand-up comic and actor
- Taslima Nasrin – Bangladeshi author, feminist, human rights activist and secular humanist
- Armin Navabi – Iranian-born atheist and secular activist, author, podcaster and vlogger, known as founder of the popular website Atheist Republic.
- Aziz Nesin – Turkish humorist and author of more than 100 books
- Asad Noor – Bangladeshi blogger and human rights activist
- Barack Obama Sr. – Kenyan senior governmental economist, and the father of Barack Obama
- Catherine Perez-Shakdam – French Jewish journalist, political analyst and commentator; formerly a marital convert to Sunni Islam
- Ibn al-Rawandi – 9th-century early skeptic of Shia Islam, of Persian origin
- Salman Rushdie – British-Indian novelist and essayist
- Nyamko Sabuni – Politician in Sweden
- Zohra Sehgal – Indian actress who has appeared in several Hindi and English language films
- Anwar Shaikh – British author of Pakistani descent
- Dr. Younus Shaikh – Pakistani medical doctor, human rights activist, rationalist and free-thinker
- Ali Soilih – Comorian socialist revolutionary; president of the Comoros
- Wafa Sultan – Syrian-born American psychiatrist; controversial critic of Islam; describes herself as a "secular humanist"
- Arzu Toker – Turkish-born German writer, journalist, publicist and translator; founder of the German organization Central Council of Ex-Muslims
- Cenk Uygur – Turkish-American co-founder and main host of the progressive talk radio show The Young Turks; agnostic
- Ibn Warraq – British Pakistani secularist author; founder of the Institute for the Secularisation of Islamic Society

== Former Shintos ==
Name	Country	Notes
Hideki Tojo	Japan	Politician, military general, and Prime Minister of Japan.
