= Formal act of defection from the Catholic Church =

Procedure for apostatizing (1983–2010)

A formal act of defection from the Catholic Church (Latin: actus formalis defectionis ab Ecclesia catholica) was an externally provable juridic act of departure from the Catholic Church that existed between 1983 and 2010.

The act was recognized from 1983 to 2010 in the 1983 Code of Canon Law as having certain juridical effects enumerated in canons 1086, 1117, and 1124. The concept of "formal" act of defection was narrower than that of "notorious" (publicly known) defection recognized in the 1917 Code of Canon Law. In 2006, the Pontifical Council for Legislative Texts specified in what a formal act of defection from the Catholic Church consisted.

In 2009, after Omnium in mentem, all mention of a formal act of defection from the Catholic Church and of any juridical effects deriving from it was removed from the Code.

== Procedure from 2006 to 2009 ==
The 2006 notification ruled that such declarations did not necessarily indicate a decision to abandon the Church in reality. It laid down that only the competent bishop or parish priest was to judge whether the person genuinely intended to leave the Church through an act of apostasy, heresy, or schism. It also pointed out that single acts of apostasy, heresy or schism (which can be repented) do not necessarily involve also a decision to leave the Church, and so "do not in themselves constitute a formal act of defection if they are not externally concretized and manifested to the ecclesiastical authority in the required manner."

The notification required therefore that the decision to leave the Church had to be manifested personally, consciously and freely, and in writing, to the competent Church authority, who was then to judge whether it was genuinely a case of "true separation from the constitutive elements of the life of the Church […] [by] an act of apostasy, heresy or schism."

== Abrogation ==
The motu proprio Omnium in mentem of 26 October 2009 removed from the canons in question all reference to an act of formal defection from the Catholic Church. Accordingly, "it is no longer appropriate to enter attempts at formal defection in the sacramental records since this juridic action is now abolished."

In late August 2010, the Holy See confirmed that it was no longer possible to defect formally from the Catholic Church. However, the Roman Catholic Archdiocese of Dublin declared on 12 October 2010 that it intended to keep a register of those who expressed the wish to defect. Since this fell short of making an annotation in the baptismal register, CountMeOut (an association in the archdiocese that had been promoting formal defections from the Catholic Church) thereupon ceased to provide defection forms.

Although the act of "formal defection" from the Catholic Church has thus been abolished, public or "notorious" (in the canonical sense) defection from the Catholic faith or from the communion of the Church is of course possible, as is expressly recognized in the 1983 Code of Canon Law. Even defection that is not known publicly is subject to the automatic spiritual penalty of excommunication laid down in canon 1364 of the 1983 Code of Canon Law. However, when determining if a marriage is lawfully celebrated, Catholic baptism is now the sole determinant of the licitness of the marriage in regards to defects of canonical form in the Catholic Church.

== See also ==
- List of former Roman Catholics
