= List of converts from Judaism =

These are lists of people who have converted from Judaism. Jews are generally still considered Jewish by other Jews unless they are actively practicing another religion, and sometimes even then.

Converts to:

- Bahá'í Faith
- Christianity
- Hinduism
- Buddhism
- Atheism/Agnosticism

== Undetermined ==
These individuals have left Judaism for an undetermined ideology.

- Polemon II, king of Cilicia converted to marry the Jewish princess Berenice; later relapsed.
- Uriel da Costa, philosopher shunned for heresy.

== See also ==
- Apostasy from Judaism
- Conversion to Judaism
- Crypto-Judaism
- Humanistic Judaism
- Jews and Buddhism
- Jewish atheism
- Jewish Buddhists
- Jewish secularism
- Jews for Jesus
- Messianic Judaism
- Off the derech (OTD)
- The Jew in the Lotus
