= James Scott (political writer) =

English cleric, academic and political writer

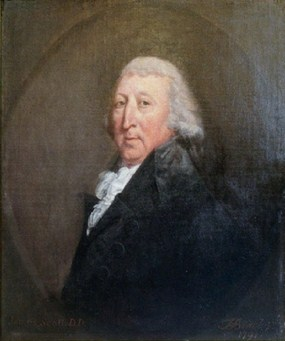
James Scott, 1781 portrait

James Scott D.D. (1733–1814) was an English cleric, academic and political writer, known for his "Anti-Sejanus" letters.

== Life ==
The son of James Scott, incumbent of Trinity Church, Leeds, by Annabella, daughter of Henry Wickham, he was born at Leeds in 1733. He was educated at Bradford Grammar School, St. Catharine Hall and Trinity College, Cambridge, where he graduated B.A. in 1757, proceeded M.A. in 1760, B.D. in 1768, and D.D. in 1775. He was elected fellow of Trinity College in 1758, and was a frequent and admired preacher at St. Mary's between 1760 and 1764.

Scott was lecturer at St John's, Leeds, between 1758 and 1769, and curate of Edmonton between 1760 and 1761. In 1771, through Lord Sandwich's interest, he was presented to the rectory of Simonburn, Northumberland, where he spent much time and money in trying to get in his tithes.

Worsted at law, some of his parishioners made an attempt on Scott's life. He then moved to London, where he died on 10 December 1814.

== Works ==
In 1765, under the inspiration of Lord Sandwich and using the pseudonym "Anti-Sejanus", Scott contributed to the Public Advertiser a series of diatribes against Lord Bute. They were reprinted in 1767 in A Collection of Interesting Letters. He was also the author of the pieces signed "Philanglia" which appear in the same collection, and of others published with the signature of "Old Slyboots" in 1769, and collected in Fugitive Political Essays, London, 1770.

Scott was three times successful in the competition for the Seatonian prize, with poems Heaven, Purity of Heart: a Moral Epistle, and An Hymn to Repentance (Cambridge, 1760–3). He was also author of:

- Odes on Several Subjects, London, 1761.
- The Redemption: a Monody, Cambridge, 1763–4.
- Every Man the Architect of his own Fortune, or the Art of Rising in the Church, a satire, London, 1763; and
- Sermons on Interesting Subjects (posthumously with his Life by Samuel Clapham), London, 1816.

== Family ==
By his wife Anne, daughter of Henry Scott, who survived him, he left no issue.
