= Preacher =

Person who talks to groups about religious topics

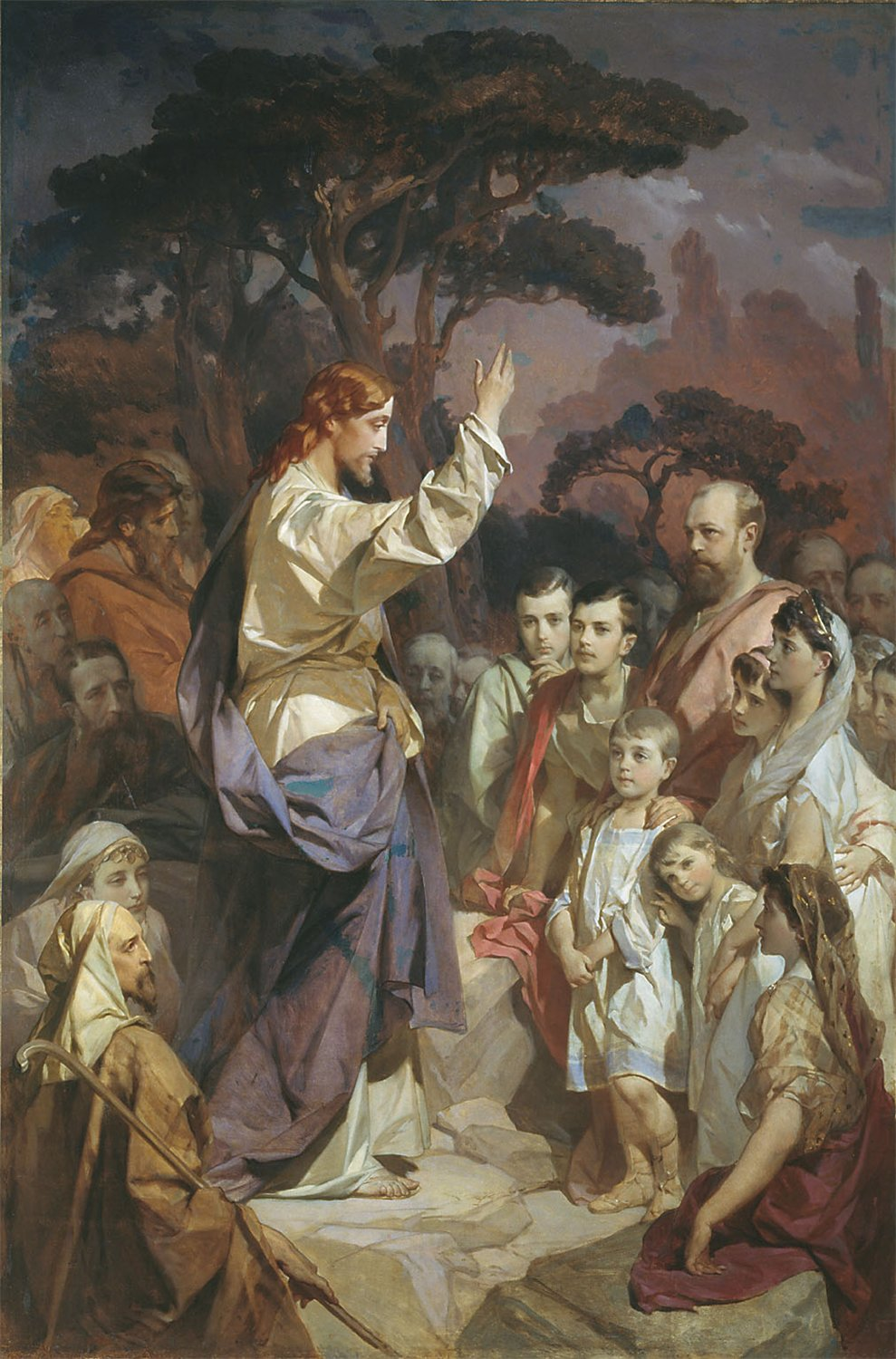
Jesus of Nazareth was an itinerant apocalyptic preacher in 1st-century Judea.

A preacher is a person who delivers sermons or homilies on religious topics to an assembly of people. Less common are preachers who preach on the street, or those whose message is not necessarily religious, but who preach components such as a moral or social worldview or philosophy.

== History ==
Preachers are common throughout most cultures. They can take the form of a Christian minister on a Sunday morning, or an Islamic imam. A Muslim preacher in general is referred to as a dā‘ī, while one giving sermons on a Friday afternoon is called a khatib.

The sermon or homily has been an important part of Christian services since Early Christianity, and remains prominent in both Roman Catholicism and Protestantism. Lay preachers sometimes figure in these traditions of worship, for example the Methodist local preachers, but in general preaching has usually been a function of the clergy. The Catholic Church sees among its ministers "an unending succession of preachers" who maintain the preaching of the original apostles "until the end of time". The Dominican Order is officially known as the Order of Preachers (Ordo Praedicatorum in Latin); friars of this order were trained to publicly preach in vernacular languages, and the order was created by Saint Dominic to preach to the Cathars of southern France in the early thirteenth century. The Franciscans are another important preaching order; Travelling preachers, usually friars, were an important feature of late medieval Catholicism.

In most denominations, modern preaching is kept below about 40 minutes, and Pope Francis recommended a maximum of 8 minutes, but, historically, preachers of all denominations could at times speak for well over an hour, sometimes for two or three hours, and use techniques of rhetoric and theatre that are today somewhat out of fashion in mainline churches.

In many churches in the United States, the title preacher is synonymous with pastor or minister, and the church's minister is often referred to simply as "our/the preacher" or by name such as "Preacher Smith".

== Other uses ==
Preacher is also the supposed author of the Book of Ecclesiastes. Preacher is one translation of the Hebrew word קהלת (Qoheleth). There is much debate about the identity of this preacher; many believe it is Solomon.

== See also ==
- Child preacher
- List of Christian preachers
- Clergy
- Da'i
- Maggid
- Preacher's kid
