= List of Pentecostals and non-denominational Evangelicals =

The following list of Pentecostals and Non-denominational Evangelicals is a catalogue of those who were members of Pentecostal churches or profess or professed adherence to pentecostalism. It is not intended to imply that all those who appear on the list were or remained Pentecostals for their entire lives. Given that Pentecostalism largely eschews the more formal aspects of communication and membership, the presence or absence of a person on this list should not be taken as authoritative, and further clarification should be obtained from biographical sources.

Numbering 169 million adherents worldwide, Pentecostals and non-denominational evangelicals comprise a significant part of the Christian church, outnumbering more widely recognised groups such as the Baptists (105 million), Lutherans (87 million), Anglicans (77 million), Reformed Churches, i.e. Calvinists, Presbyterians and Congregationalists (75 million), but a smaller proportion than those adhering to Eastern Orthodoxy (260 million). Cf. the Wikipedia page on denomination sizes for sources and further detail.

== Preachers, theologians, and missionaries ==
- A. A. Allen (1911–1970) Healing Tent Evangelist of the 1950s and 1960s
- Joseph Ayo Babalola (1904–1959) Oke - Ooye, Ilesa revivalist in 1930. Also, spiritual founder of Christ Apostolic Church
- William M. Branham (1909–1965) Healing Evangelists of the mid 20th century
- Gaston B. Cashwell, (1860–1916)
- John Alexander Dowie (1848–1907)
- Rex Humbard (1919–2007) The first successful TV evangelist of the mid-1950s, 1960s, and the 1970s and at one time had the largest television audience of any televangelist in the U.S.
- George Jeffreys (1889–1972) founder of the Elim Foursquare Gospel Alliance and Bible-Pattern Church Fellowship in Britain
- Kathryn Krick (born 1991), American social media personality and pastor of Five-Fold Church
- Kathryn Kuhlman (1907–1976) American female evangelist who brought Pentecostalism into the mainstream denominations
- Steven Jack Land, theologian
- Gerald Archie Mangun (1919–2010) Minister of one of the largest churches within the United Pentecostal Church, located in Alexandria, Louisiana
- Charles Harrison Mason (1866–1961) The Founder of the Church of God In Christ
- Aimee Semple McPherson (1890–1944) American Female Evangelist, pastor, and organizer of the International Church of the Foursquare Gospel
- Charles Fox Parham (1873–1929) Father of Modern Pentecostalism
- David du Plessis (1905–1987) South-African Pentecostal church leader, one of the founders of the Charismatic movement
- Oral Roberts (1918–2009) Healing-tent evangelist who made the transition to televangelism; founder of Oral Roberts University in Tulsa, Oklahoma.
- William J. Seymour (1870–1922) Azusa Street Mission Founder (Azusa Street Revival)
- Albert Benjamin Simpson (1843–1919)
- Smith Wigglesworth (1859–1947)
- Maria Woodworth-Etter (1844–1924)

== See also ==
- List of Christian theologians
- List of preachers
- Lists of people by belief
