= Lists of people by belief =

These are articles that list people of a particular religious or political belief or other worldview.

== Lists of people by political belief ==
- List of Christian leftists
- List of social democrats
- List of neoconservatives

Anarchists

- List of anarchists
- List of anarchist musicians
- List of anarchist poets
- List of American anarchists
- List of Jewish anarchists
- List of Russian anarchists

Communists

- List of left communists
- List of Marxists
- List of Portuguese communists
- List of Romanian communists
- List of communists imprisoned by the Kingdom of Romania
- List of German Communist Party members

Libertarians

- List of libertarian organizations
- List of libertarian political parties
- List of libertarians in the United States

Nationalists

- List of Arab nationalists
- List of Canadian nationalist leaders

Socialists

- List of democratic socialists
- List of Muslim socialists
- List of Christian socialists

== Lists of people by religious belief ==
- List of Bahá'ís
  - List of former Bahá'ís
- List of Buddhists
  - List of Korean Buddhists
  - List of Rinzai Buddhists
  - List of Marathi Buddhists
  - List of converts to Buddhism
  - List of former Buddhists
- Lists of Christians
  - List of converts to Christianity
  - Lists of patriarchs, archbishops, and bishops
  - List of Christian missionaries
  - List of Christian preachers
  - List of Christian theologians
  - List of religious studies scholars
  - List of Jesuits
  - List of Catholic priests
  - List of saints
  - List of television evangelists
  - Lists of former Christians
  - List of former Protestants
  - By Christian denomination:
    - List of Anglicans and Episcopalians
    - List of Baptists
    - List of Huguenots
    - List of Latter-day Saints
      - The Church of Jesus Christ of Latter-day Saints
        - List of LDS Church presidents
        - List of LDS Church Apostles
        - List of LDS Church general authorities
      - Community of Christ
        - List of Community of Christ Prophet–Presidents
      - The Church of Jesus Christ (Bickertonite)
        - List of Church of Jesus Christ presidents
    - List of Methodists
    - List of Pentecostals and non-denominational Evangelicals
    - List of Puritans
    - List of Quakers
    - Lists of Roman Catholics
      - List of former Roman Catholics
      - List of popes
    - List of Seventh-day Adventists
    - List of Christian Universalists
- List of Unitarians, Universalists, and Unitarian Universalists
- List of Confucianists
- List of Hindus
  - List of converts to Hinduism
  - List of former Hindus
- List of Jains
  - List of Jains
- List of Jews
  - List of converts to Judaism
  - List of rabbis
  - List of Jewish Nobel laureates
  - List of former Jews
- Monks
- List of Muslims
  - List of caliphs
  - List of converts to Islam
  - List of former Muslims
  - By Muslim denomination:
    - List of Ahmadis
    - List of Shia Muslims
- List of occultists
- List of pagans (includes believers in Wicca)
- List of Pantheists
- List of Rastafarians
- List of Satanists
- List of Sikhs
  - List of converts to Sikhism
- Swedenborgians
- List of Taoists
- List of Thelemites
- List of Unificationists
- List of ministers of the Universal Life Church
- List of Zoroastrians

=== Agnostics, atheists, humanists ===
- List of agnostics
- Lists of atheists
- List of Deists
  - List of former atheists and agnostics
  - List of South African atheists
- List of humanists
- List of Jewish atheists and agnostics

== Other worldviews ==
- List of vegans
- List of vegetarians

== See also ==
- Religions of the world
- List of Biblical figures
- List of messiah claimants
- List of lists of lists
