= List of Christian preachers =

This is a list of notable Christian preachers.

== Early Church ==
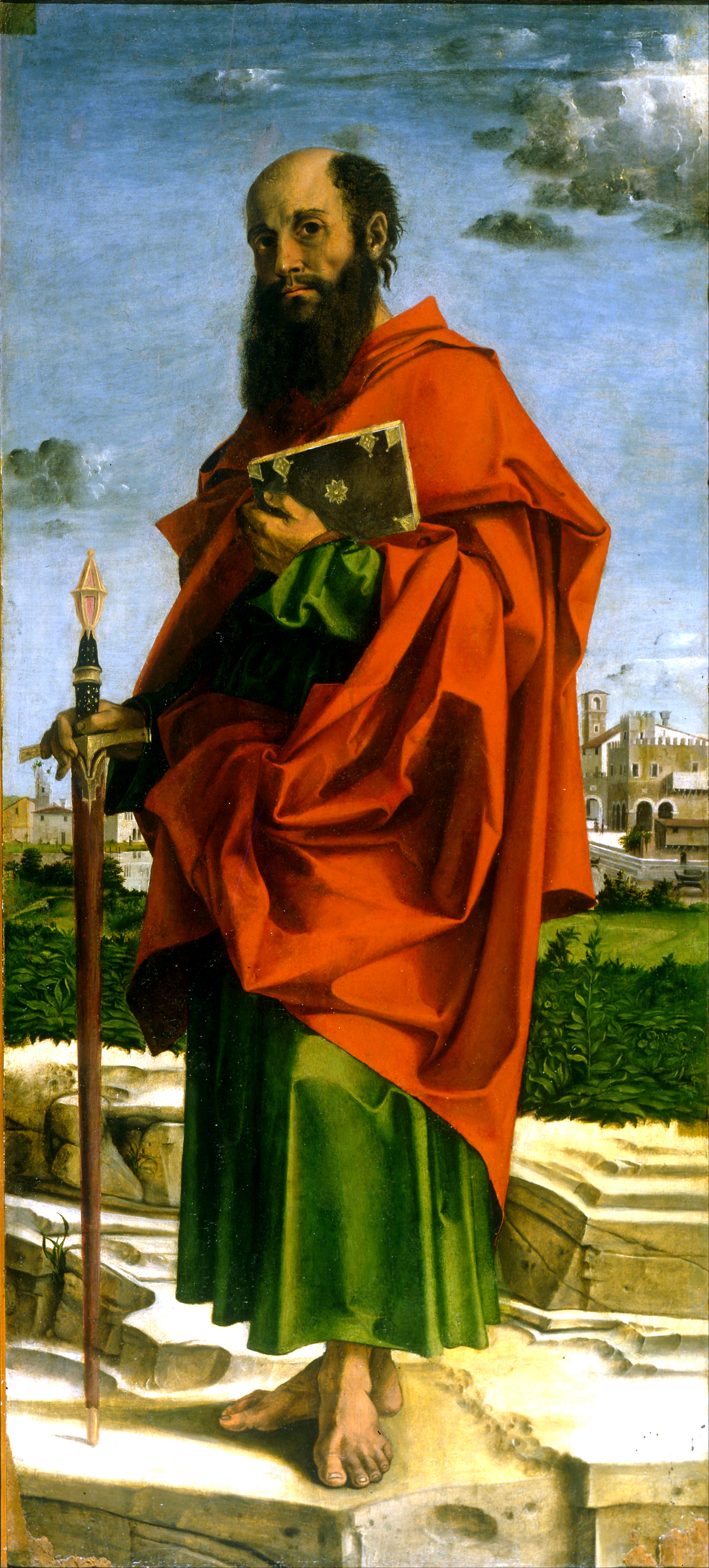
Paul

- Stephen (?–34) Stoned
- James (?–44) Apostle
- Barnabas (?–61) Disciple
- Paul (5–67) Beheaded
- Peter (?–67) Crucified
- Mark (?–68) Gospel of Mark
- Philemon (?–68) Recipient of the Epistle to Philemon
- Luke (?–84) Four Evangelists
- Timothy (17–97) Bishop of Ephesus
- John (6–100) Book of Revelation
- Silas (?–100) Silvanus of the Seventy
- Ignatius (35–107) Apostolic Fathers
- Titus (?–107) Bishop of Crete
- Simeon (?–117) Jewish Christian
- Polycarp (69–155) Bishop of Smyrna
- Matthew (?) Apostle
- Ananias (?) Sent to restore the sight of Saul of Tarsus
- Apollos (?) Acts of the Apostles, 1 Corinthians
- Priscilla and Aquila (?) Christian Missionary
- Stephanas (?) Household baptized by the Apostle Paul

== Western Church ==
- Peter Chrysologus (406–450)
- Pope Leo I (400–461)
- Fulgentius of Ruspe (c 462–533)
- Martin of Braga (520–580)
- Saint Boniface (675–754)
- Saint Dominic (1170–1221)
- Anthony of Padua (1195–1231)
- Johannes Tauler, German Dominican (1300–1361)
- Oliver Maillard, French Franciscan (c.1430–1502)
- Savonarola, Italian Dominican (1452–1498)
- John of Capistrano (1386–1456), Italian Franciscan
- Vincent Ferrer (1350–1419), Spanish Dominican
- Bernardino of Siena (1380–1444), Italian

== Roman Catholic ==
- Julian Maunoir (1606–1683) French Jesuit "Apostle of Brittany"
- Tomasz Młodzianowski (1622–1686), Polish Jesuit
- Paolo Segneri (1624–1694), Italian Jesuit
- Junípero Serra, (1713–1784)
- Jacques-Bénigne Bossuet (1627–1704)
- Louis Bourdaloue (1632–1704), Jesuit
- Tobia Lionelli (1647–1714), Slovene in Order of Friars Minor Capuchin
- Jean Baptiste Massillon (1663–1742)
- Theobald Mathew (1790–1856), Irish Capuchin and temperance reformer
- Aloysius Gentili (1801–48) Italian Rosminian, working in England
- Charles Coughlin (1891–1979)
- Fulton J. Sheen (1895–1979)

== Proto-Reformation ==
- John Wycliffe (1320–1384) Lollards
- Jan Hus (1369–1415)

== Lutheran ==
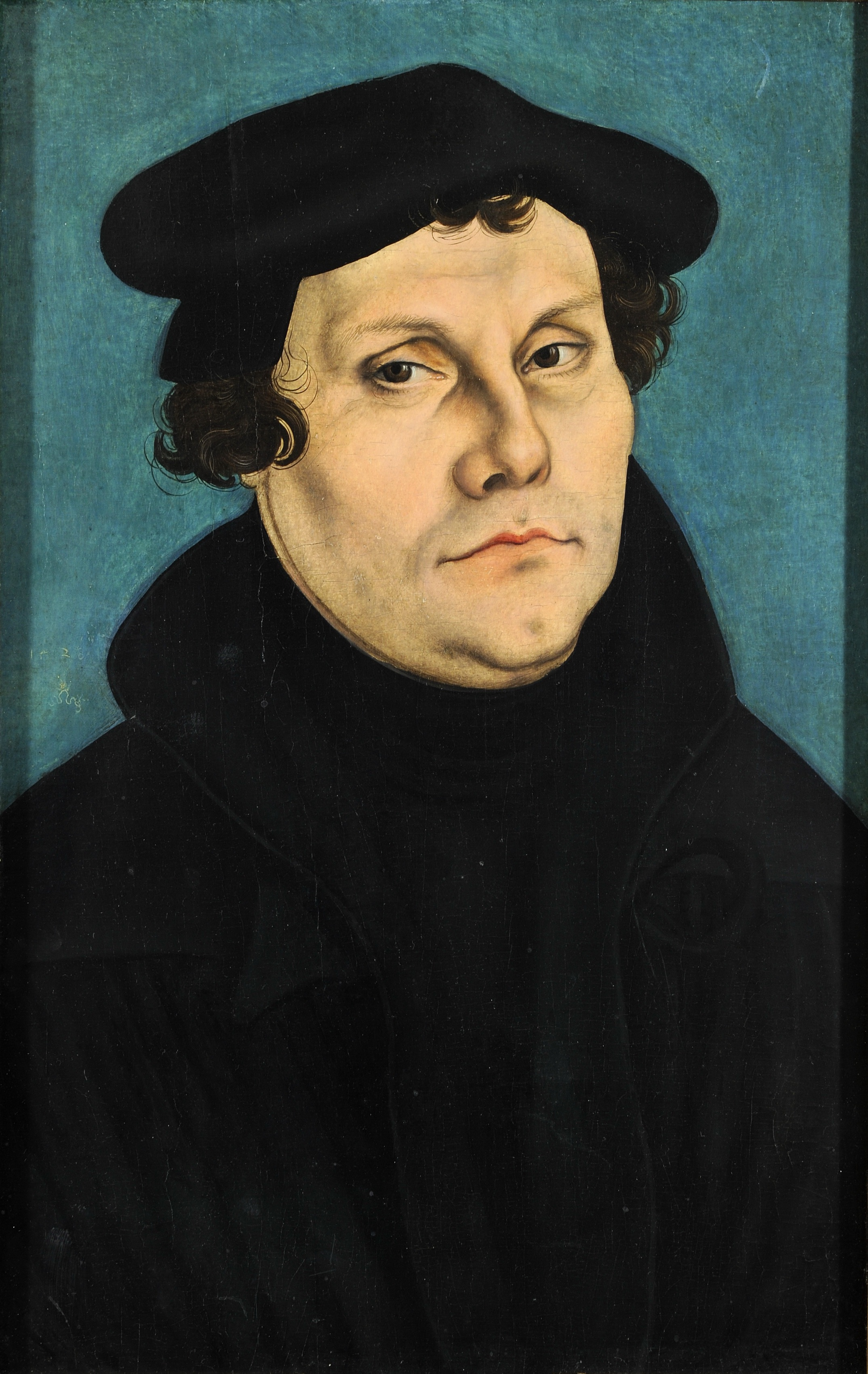
Martin Luther

- Martin Luther (1483–1547) The Ninety-Five Theses
- Philipp Melanchthon (1497–1560)
- Lars Levi Laestadius (1800–1861)
- Bernt B. Haugan (1862)
- C.F.W. Walther (1811–1887)
- Martin Niemöller (1892–1984)
- Dietrich Bonhoeffer (1906–1945)
- Walter A. Maier (1893–1950)
- J.A.O. Preus II (1920–1994)
- Gerhard Forde (1927–2005)
- John Warwick Montgomery (1931-2024)
- Rod Rosenbladt (1942–2024)
- Gerald B. Kieschnick (1943–present)
- Mark Hanson (1946–present)
- Matt Harrison (1962–present)

== Calvinist ==
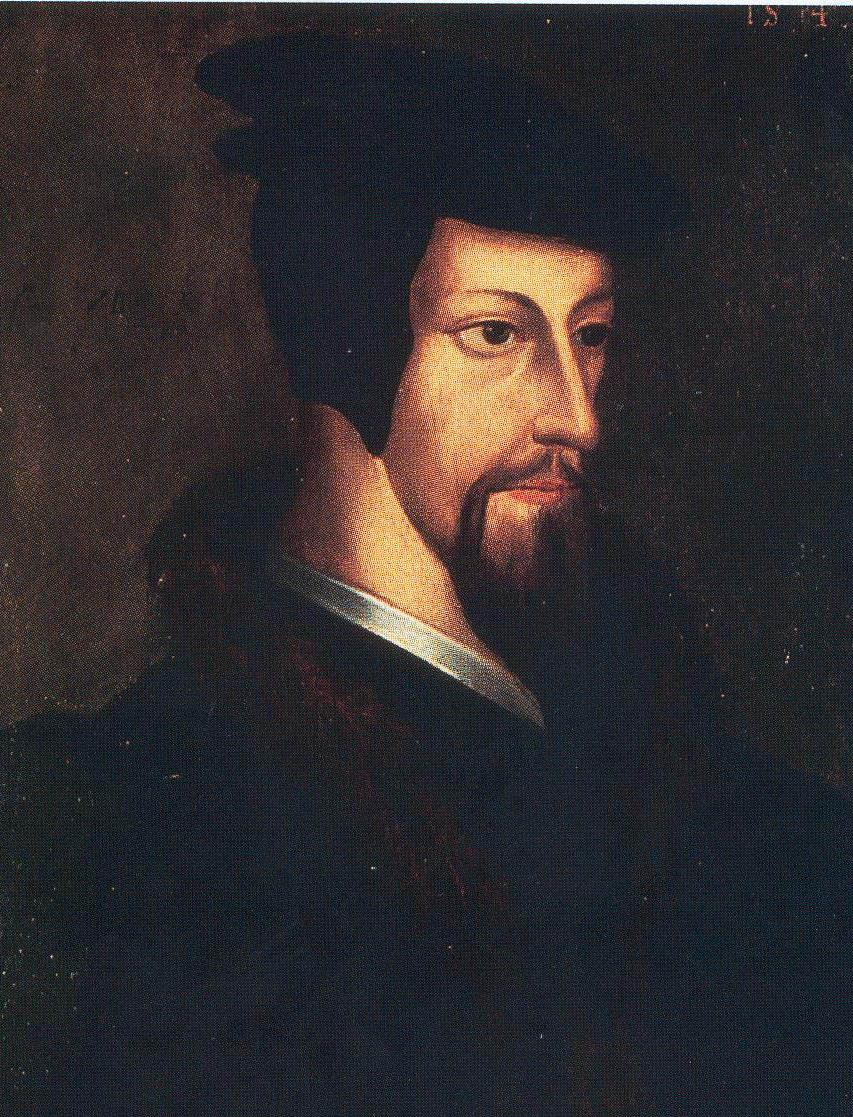
John Calvin

- John Oecolampadius (1482–1531)
- Huldrych Zwingli (1484–1531)
- Martin Bucer (1491–1551)
- Peter Martyr Vermigli (1500–1562)
- Wolfgang Musculus (1497–1563)
- Andreas Hyperius (1511–1564)
- John Calvin (1509–1564)
- Guillaume Farel (1489–1565)
- Heinrich Bullinger (1504–1575)

== Presbyterian ==
- John Knox (1513–1572) Protestant Reformation
- Charles Grandison Finney (1792–1875)
- Lyman Beecher (1799–1863)
- Jonathan Goforth (1859–1936) Canadian Presbyterian Mission
- Peter Marshall (1903–1949) New York Avenue Presbyterian Church
- James Montgomery Boice (1938–2000) Tenth Presbyterian Church in Philadelphia
- Ian Paisley (1926–2014)
- Frederick Buechner (1926–present)
- D. James Kennedy (1930–2007) Coral Ridge Presbyterian Church
- R. C. Sproul (1939–2017) Ligonier Ministries
- Tim Keller (1950–2023)

== Anglican ==
- Hugh Latimer (1470–1555) Oxford Martyrs
- Thomas Cranmer (1489–1556) Oxford Martyrs
- Lancelot Andrewes (1555–1626)
- John Donne (1572–1631)
- John Tillotson (1630–1694)
- John Newton (1725–1807) Author of Amazing Grace
- Laurence Sterne (1713–1759), mainly in book form
- Samuel Clapham (known as Theophilus St. John) (1755–1830)
- J. C. Ryle (1816–1900)
- Phillips Brooks (1835–1893)
- John Stott (1921–2011)
- Dick Lucas (1925–present)
- John Chapman (evangelist) (1930–2012)
- Peter Jensen (1943–present)
- Phillip Jensen (1945–present)
- N. T. Wright (1948–present)
- Michael Bruce Curry (1953–present)
- Nicky Gumbel (1955–present)

== Puritan ==
- John Harvard (1607–1638)
- John Owen (1616-1683)
- Joseph Alleine (1634–1668)
- John Davenport (1597–1670)
- Matthew Henry (1662–1714)
- Jonathan Edwards (1703–1758)

== Independent Evangelical (Evangelical Free) ==
- G. Campbell Morgan (1863–1945)
- Martyn Lloyd-Jones (1899–1981)

== Baptist ==
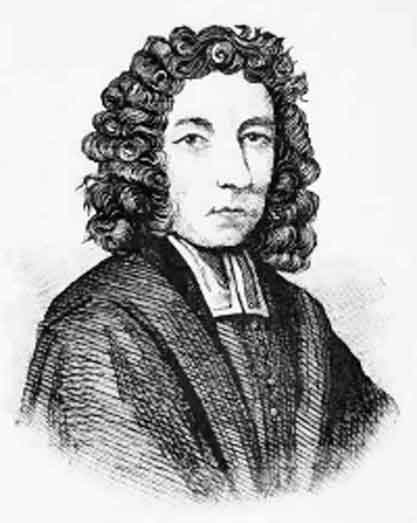
Early Baptist preacher Benjamin Keach

- Balthasar Hubmaier (1480–1528) (Anabaptist)
- Roger Williams (1603–1684)
- John Bunyan (1628–1688)
- William Kiffin (1616–1701)
- Benjamin Keach (1640–1704) (Reformed/Particular Baptist)
- John Gill (1697–1771) (Reformed/Particular Baptist)
- Isaac Backus (1724–1806)
- John Gano (1727–1804)
- Andrew Fuller (1754–1815) (Reformed/Particular Baptist)
- John Leland (1754–1841)
- Robert Hall (1764–1831)
- William Carey (1761–1834) (Reformed/Particular Baptist)
- Christmas Evans (1755–1838)
- William Miller (1782–1849)
- Adoniram Judson (1788–1850) (Reformed/Particular Baptist)
- Nat Turner (1800-1831)
- William Garrett Lewis (1834–1885)
- Charles Spurgeon (1834–1892) Metropolitan Tabernacle (Reformed/Particular Baptist)
- John Alexis Edgren (1839–1908)
- Alexander Maclaren (1826–1910)
- Frances E. Townsley (1850–1909)
- Oswald Chambers (1874–1917)
- George W. Truett (1867–1944)
- Harry A. Ironside (1876–1951)
- J. Frank Norris (1877–1952)
- Mordecai Ham (1877–1961)
- Martin Luther King Jr. (1929–1968) (Non-Trinitarian, non confessional)
- Harry Emerson Fosdick (1878–1969)
- George Beauchamp Vick (1901–1975)
- John R. Rice (1895–1980)
- Lester Roloff (1914–1982)
- Joseph Harrison Jackson (1900–1990)
- Curtis Hutson (1934–1995)
- Jack Hyles (1926–2001)
- W.A. Criswell (1909–2002) Southern Baptist Convention
- Stephen F. Olford (1918–2004)
- Adrian Rogers (1931–2005)
- Jerry Falwell (1933–2007)
- Lee Roberson (1909–2007)
- Neiliezhü Üsou (1941–2009)
- Peter Ruckman (1921–2016)
- Billy Graham (1918–2018) (non confessional)
- Charles Stanley (1932–2023)
- Albert N. Martin (1934–present)
- Tony Campolo (1935–2024)
- Kent Hovind (1953–present)
- Paul Washer (1961-present)
- Voddie Baucham (1969-2025)

== Methodist ==
- George Whitefield (1714–1770)
- Daniel Rowland (1713–1790)
- John Wesley (1703–1791)
- Francis Asbury (1747–1816)
- Peter Cartwright (1785–1873)
- William Booth (1829–1912) The Salvation Army
- Bob Jones, Sr. (1883–1968) Bob Jones University
- Leslie Weatherhead (1893–1976)
- William Willimon (1946–present)

== Independent ==
- Nicolaus Zinzendorf (1700–1760), Moravian Church
- Dwight L. Moody (1837–1899) Moody Bible Institute
- R. A. Torrey (1856–1928) Church of the Open Door
- Billy Sunday (1862–1935) Evangelist
- A.W. Tozer (1897–1963) Christian and Missionary Alliance
- J. Vernon McGee (1904–1988) Church of the Open Door
- Walter Martin (1928–1989) Christian Research Institute
- Paris Reidhead (1919–1992) Christian and Missionary Alliance
- Leonard Ravenhill (1907–1994) Evangelist
- David Wilkerson (1931–2011) Times Square Church
- Chuck Smith (1927–2013) Calvary Chapel
- John MacArthur (1939–2025) Grace Community Church
- Ravi Zacharias (1946–2020) Christian apologist
- John Piper (1946–present)

== Seventh-day Adventist ==
- Joseph Bates (1792–1872) Great Disappointment
- James White (1821–1881) Adventist Review
- John Nevins Andrews (1829–1883) Andrews University
- Ellen G. White (1827–1915) Conflict of the Ages (book series)
- James Edson White (1849–1928) Review and Herald Publishing Association
- H.M.S. Richards, Sr. (1894–1985) Voice of Prophecy
- George Vandeman (1916–2000) It Is Written
- Mark Finley (1945–present) It Is Written

== Church of Christ ==
- Walter Scott (1796–1861)
- Batsell Baxter (1886–1956)
- Marshall Keeble (1878–1968)
- Batsell Barrett Baxter (1916–1982)
- Ira North (1892–1984)
- Kenneth W. Wright (1945–present)

== Pentecostal ==
- Smith Wigglesworth (1859–1947) Pentecostalism
- William J. Seymour (1870–1922) Azusa Street Revival
- Charles Parham (1873–1929) Speaking in tongues
- F. F. Bosworth (1877–1958)
- Aimee Semple McPherson (1890–1944) Foursquare Church
- William Branham (1909–1965) Faith Healer, prophet
- A. A. Allen (1911–1970)
- James Gordon Lindsay (1906–1973) Faith Healer
- Kathryn Kuhlman (1907–1976) Faith Healer
- Derek Prince (1915–2003) Faith, spiritual warfare, demonology
- Kenneth E. Hagin (1917–2003) Word of Faith
- Jack Coe (1918–1956)
- Oral Roberts (1918–2009) Oral Roberts University
- Yiye Ávila (1925–2013)
- Marcus Lamb (1957–2021) Pentecostalism, televangelist
- Morris Cerullo (1931–2020) Pentecostalism, evangelist
- Jimmy Swaggart (1935–2025) Assemblies of God
- David Yonggi Cho (1936–present) Yoido Full Gospel Church, Assemblies of God Discipleship, church Growth
- Jim Bakker (1940–present) Tammy Bakker (1942–2007) Assemblies of God televangelists
- Reinhard Bonnke (1940–2019) evangelist
- William Kumuyi (1941–present)
- Ezekiel H. Guti (1923–2023) Forward in Faith Ministries International
- Steven Furtick (1980–present)
- Daniel Olukoya (1989 - present) Mountain of Fire and Miracles Ministries Worldwide

== Charismatic ==
- Paul Cain (1929–2019) Kansas City Prophets
- John Wimber (1934–1997) Vineyard Movement
- Kenneth Copeland (1936–present) Eagle Mountain International Church
- Benson Idahosa (1938–1998) Word of Faith
- Enoch Adeboye (1942–present) Redeemed Christian Church of God, Servant of Yahweh
- Joyce Meyer (1943–present)
- Benny Hinn (1952–present) Prosperity theology
- David Oyedepo (1954–present) Living Faith Church Worldwide
- T.D. Jakes (1957–present) Prosperity theology
- Nicholas Duncan-Williams (1957–present) Faith, Spiritual Warfare, Prayer
- Mensa Otabil (1959–present) Prosperity theology
- Dag Heward-Mills (1963–present) Evangelist & Crusades, Church Growth, Church Planting, Loyalty & Disloyalty
- Joseph Prince (1963–present) Prosperity theology
- Joel Osteen (1963–present) Prosperity theology
- Chris Oyakhilome (1963–present) Christ Embassy
- General Butt Naked (1971–present) the End Time Train Evangelistic Ministries Inc.

== Preachers with secular professions ==
- Thomas Hopkins Gallaudet (1787–1851)
- Ralph Waldo Emerson (1803–1882)
- William Gannaway Brownlow (1805–1877)
- James Garfield (1831–1881)
- William Lee Taylor (1854–1915)
- William A. Creditt (1864–1921)
- Eric Liddell (1902–1945)
- Hugh Beaumont (1903–1984)
- Carl Stuart Hamblen (1908–1989)
- Jerry Clower (1926–1998)
- Fred Rogers (1928–2003)
- Bill Moyers (1934–2025)
- Joe Simon (1936–2021)
- John Danforth (1936–present)
- Eugene Record (1940–2005)
- Grady Nutt (1937–1982)
- Solomon Burke (1940–2010)
- Ted DiBiase (1954–present)
- Ted DiBiase Jr. (1982–present)
- Clifton Davis (1945–present)
- Denzel Washington (1954–present)
- Al Green (1946–present)
- Eddie Holman (1946–present)
- Jesse Jackson (1941–2026)
- Bernice King (1963–present)
- George Foreman (1949–2025)
- Mike Huckabee (1955–present)
- Al Sharpton (1954–present)
- Ernie Fletcher (1952–present)
- Reggie White (1961–2004)
- John Battle (1962–present)
- Richard Rossi (1963–present)
- Pebbles (1964–present)
- John Blue (1966–present)
- Raphael Warnock (1969–present)
- Kirk Cameron (1970–present)
- Montell Jordan (1968–present)
- Napoleon Kaufman (1973–present)
- Stacy Lattisaw (1966–present)
- Candace Cameron Bure (1976–present)
- Kel Mitchell (1978–present)
- Freddie Stone (1947–present)
- Darryl Strawberry (1962–present)
- Derwin Gray (1971–present)
- Vanity (1959–2016)
- Kurtis Blow (1959–present)
- Joseph Simmons (1964–present)
- Jay Underwood (1968–present)
- Warryn Campbell (1975–present) *
- Demond Wilson (1946–2026) *
- Rosey Grier (1932–present) *

== Gallery ==
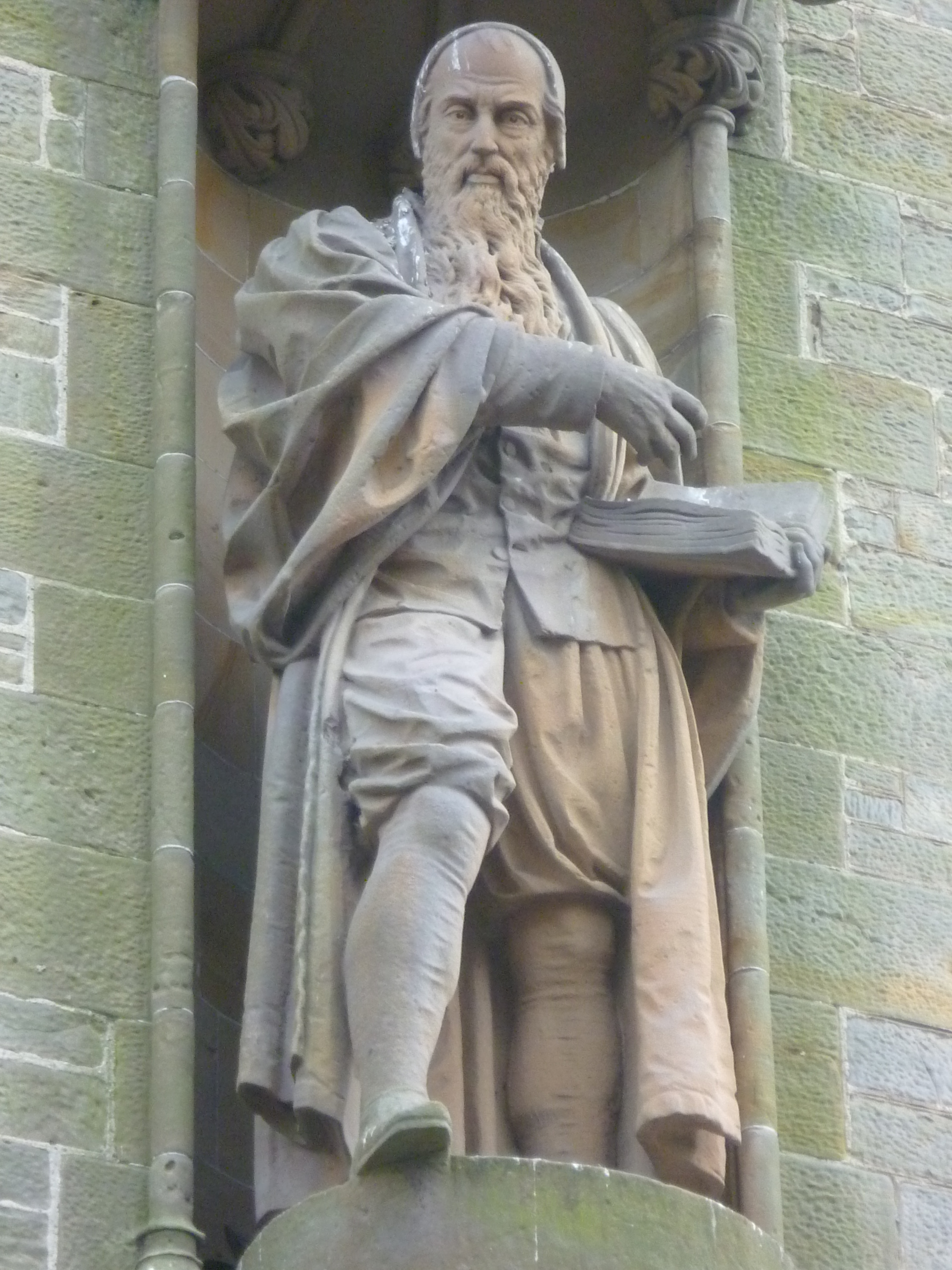
John Knox

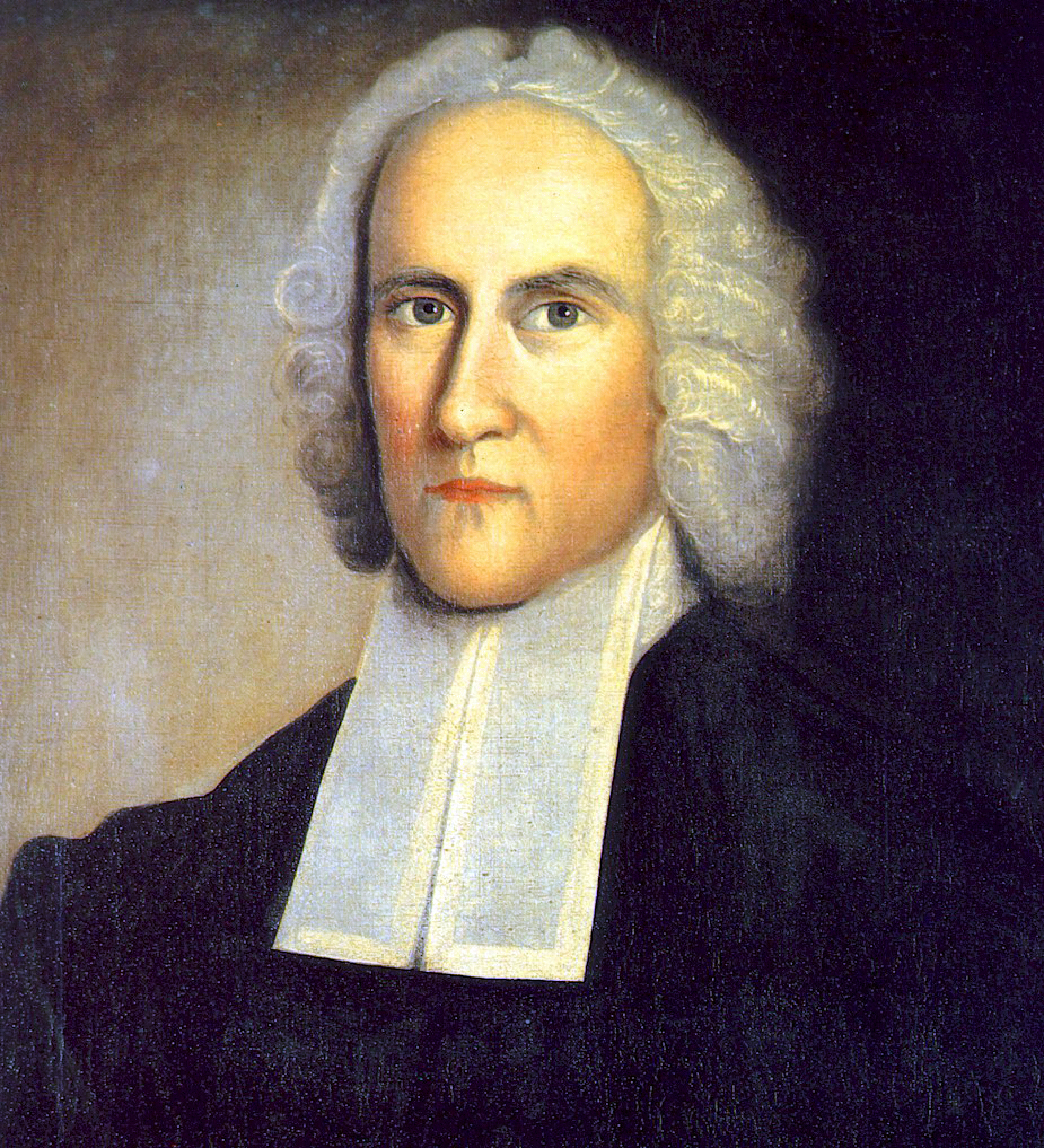
Jonathan Edwards

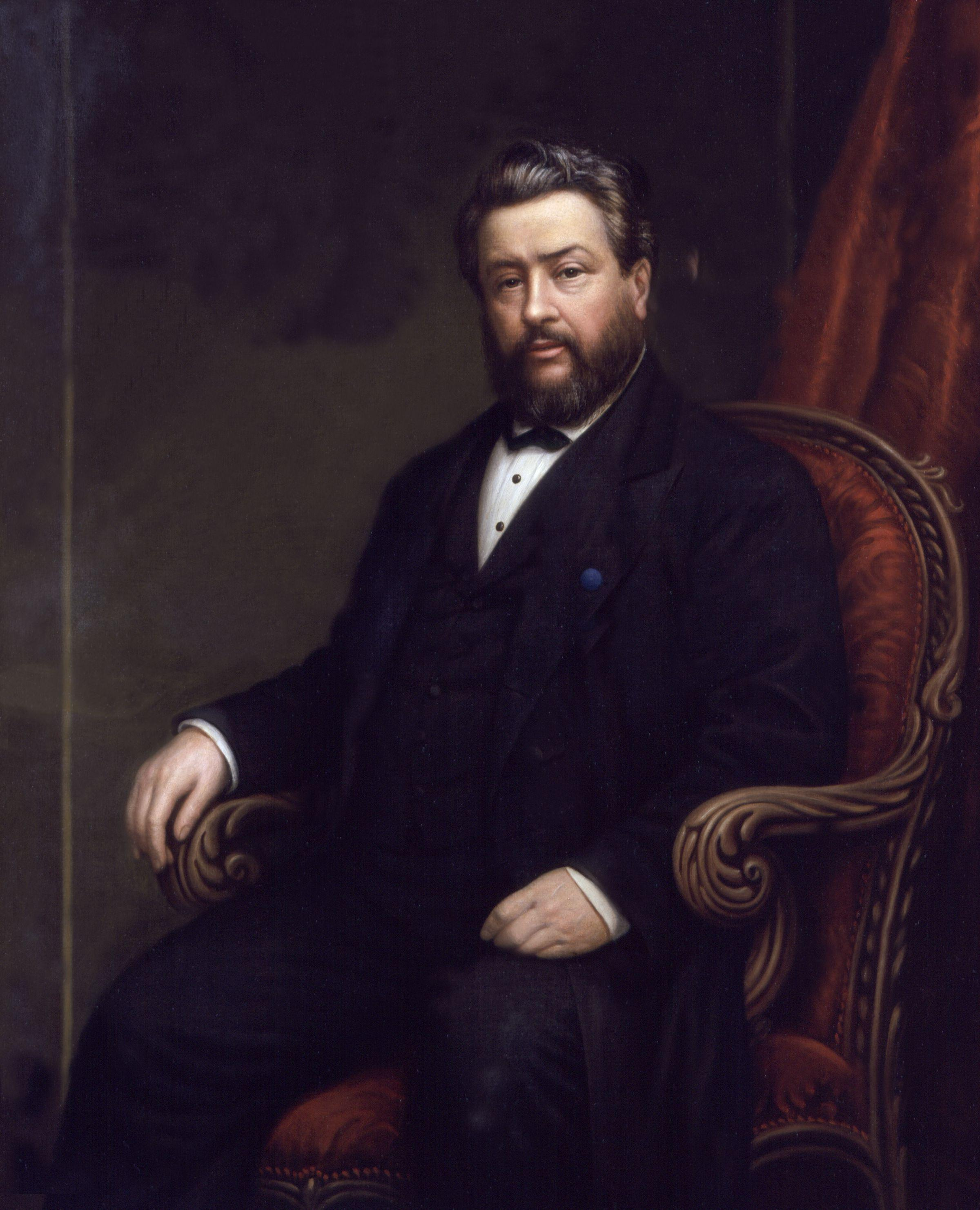
Charles Spurgeon

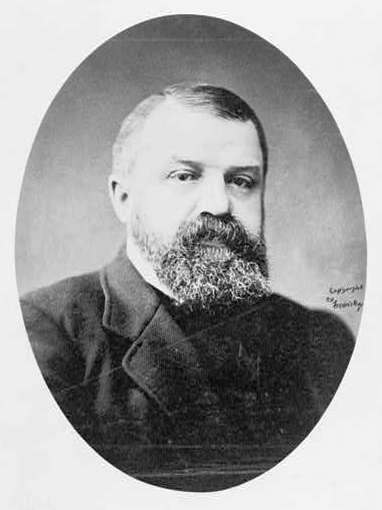
D.L. Moody

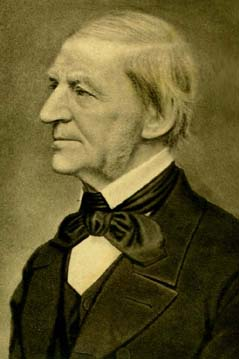
Ralph Waldo Emerson
