= List of deists =

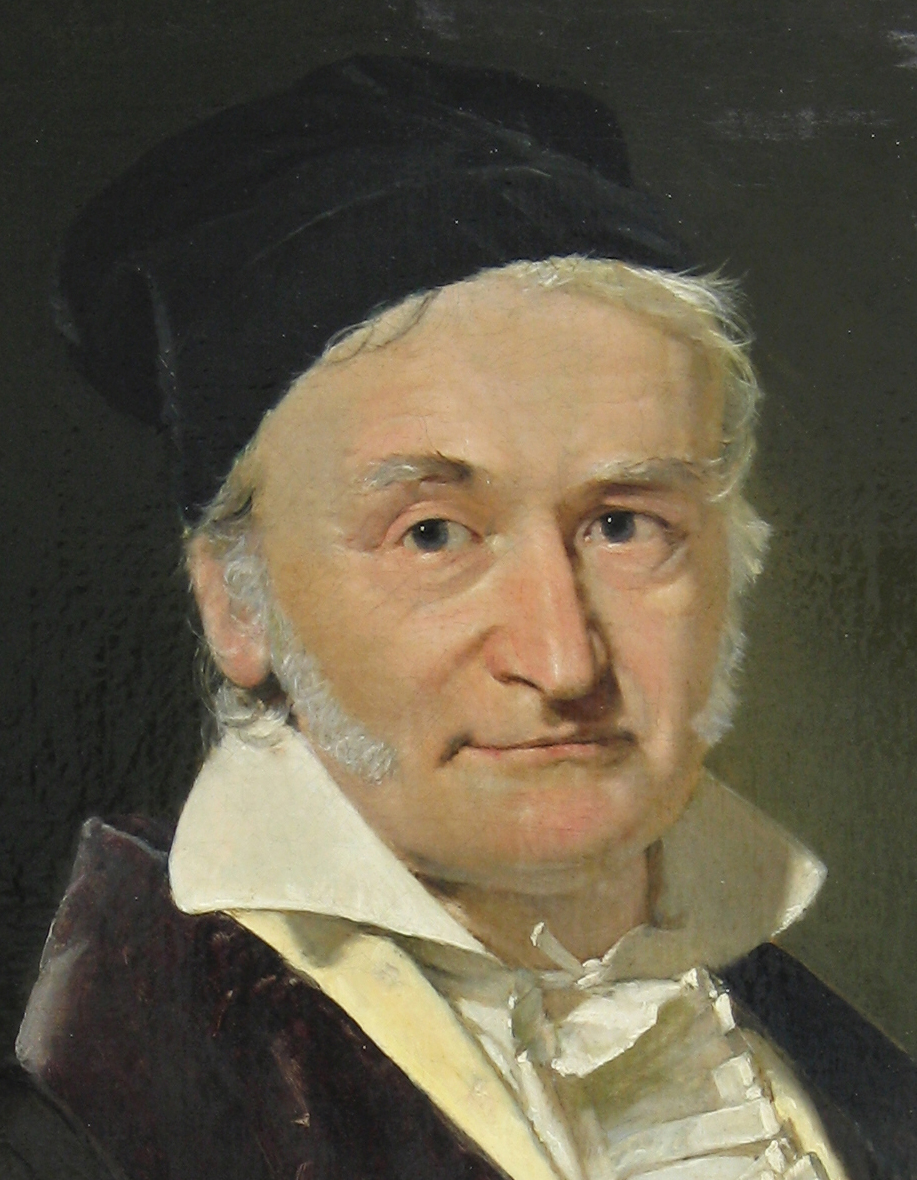
Carl Friedrich Gauss

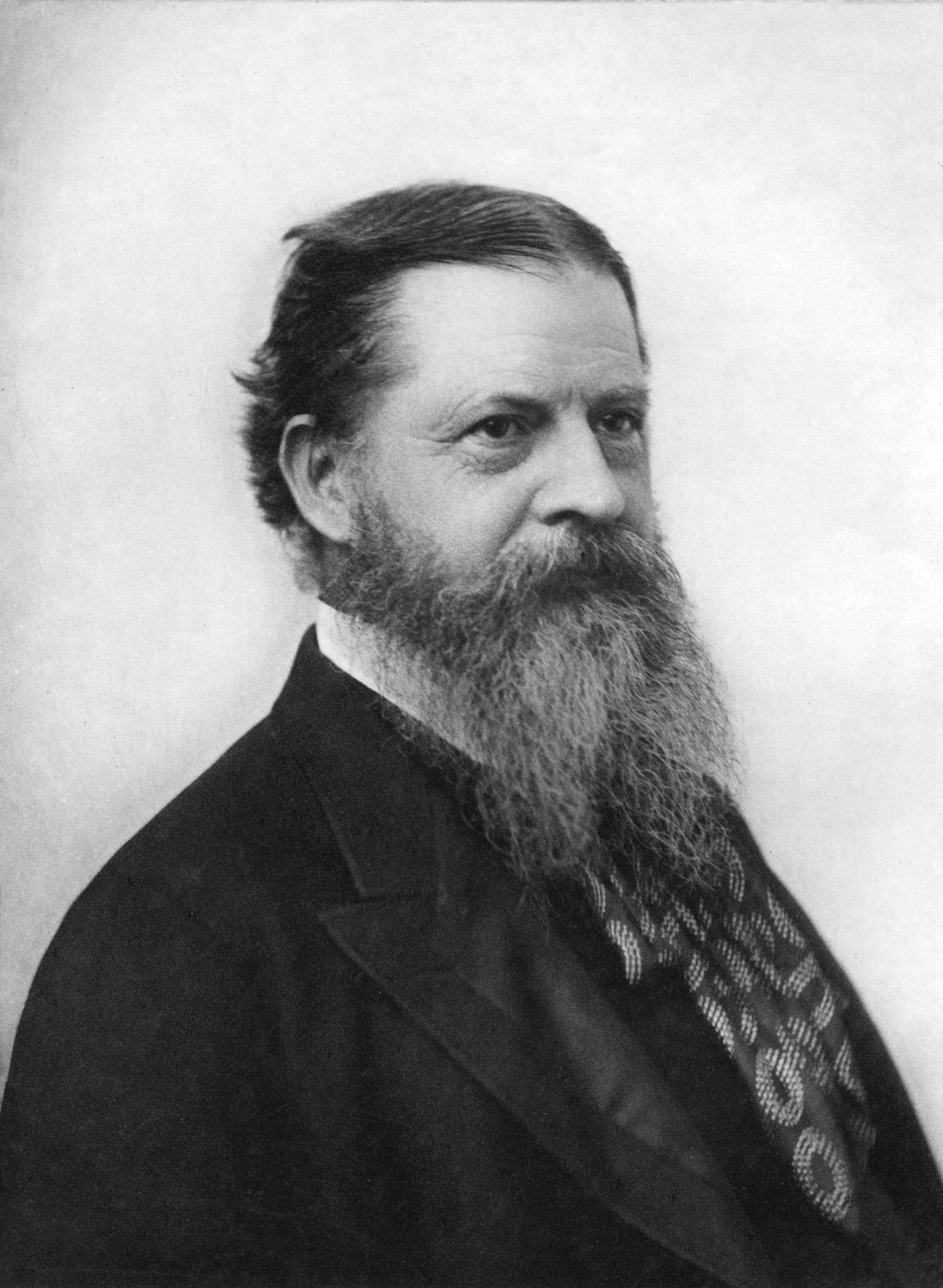
Charles Sanders Peirce

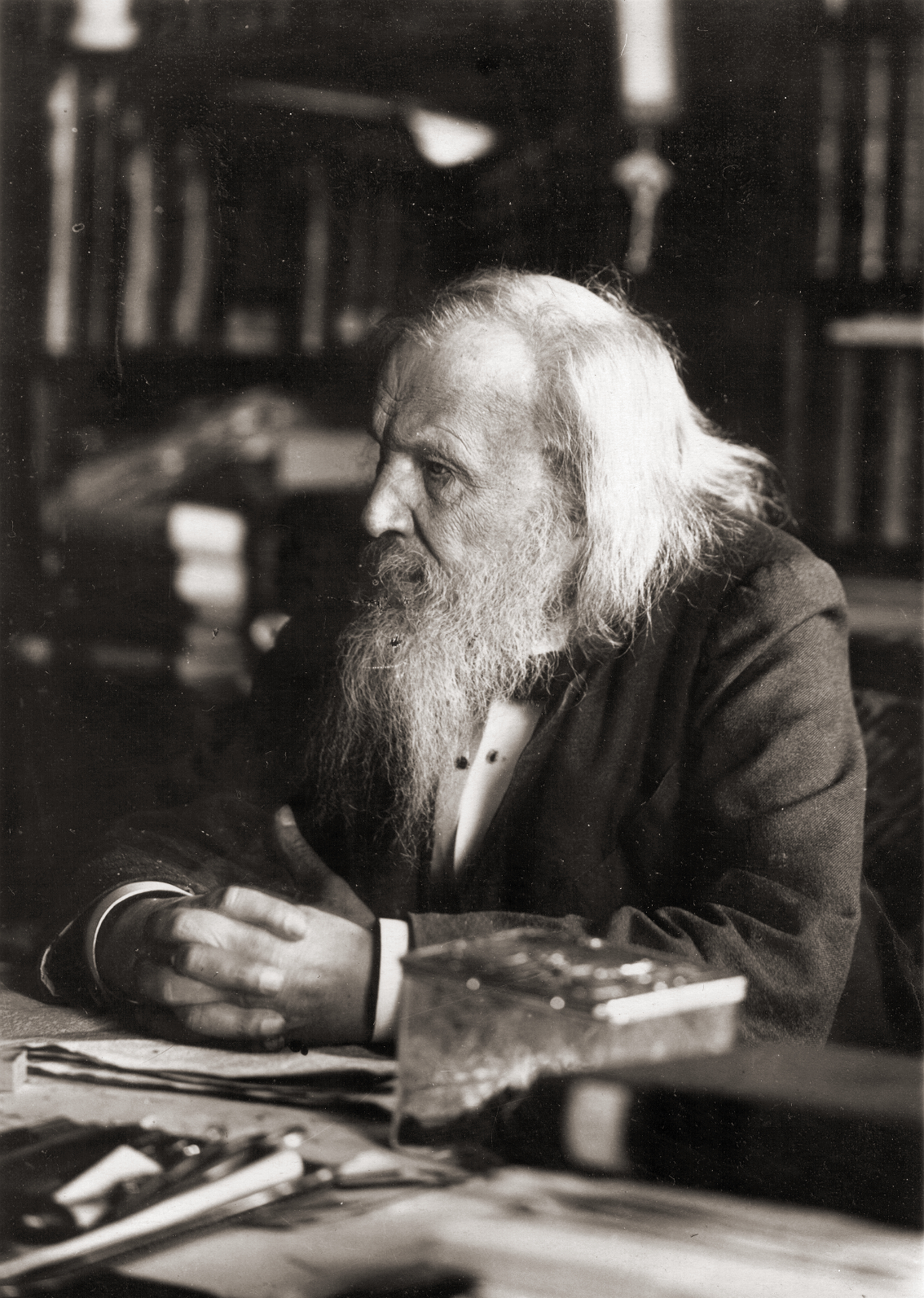
Dmitri Mendeleev

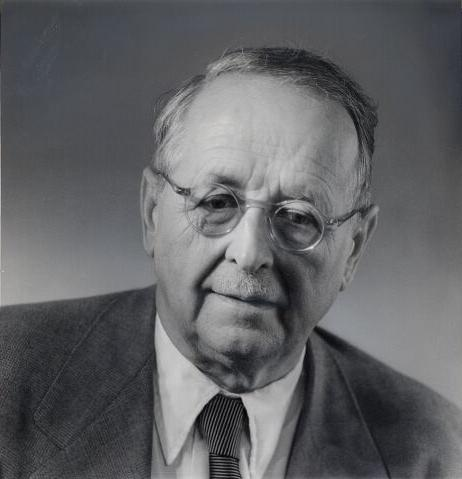
Hermann Weyl

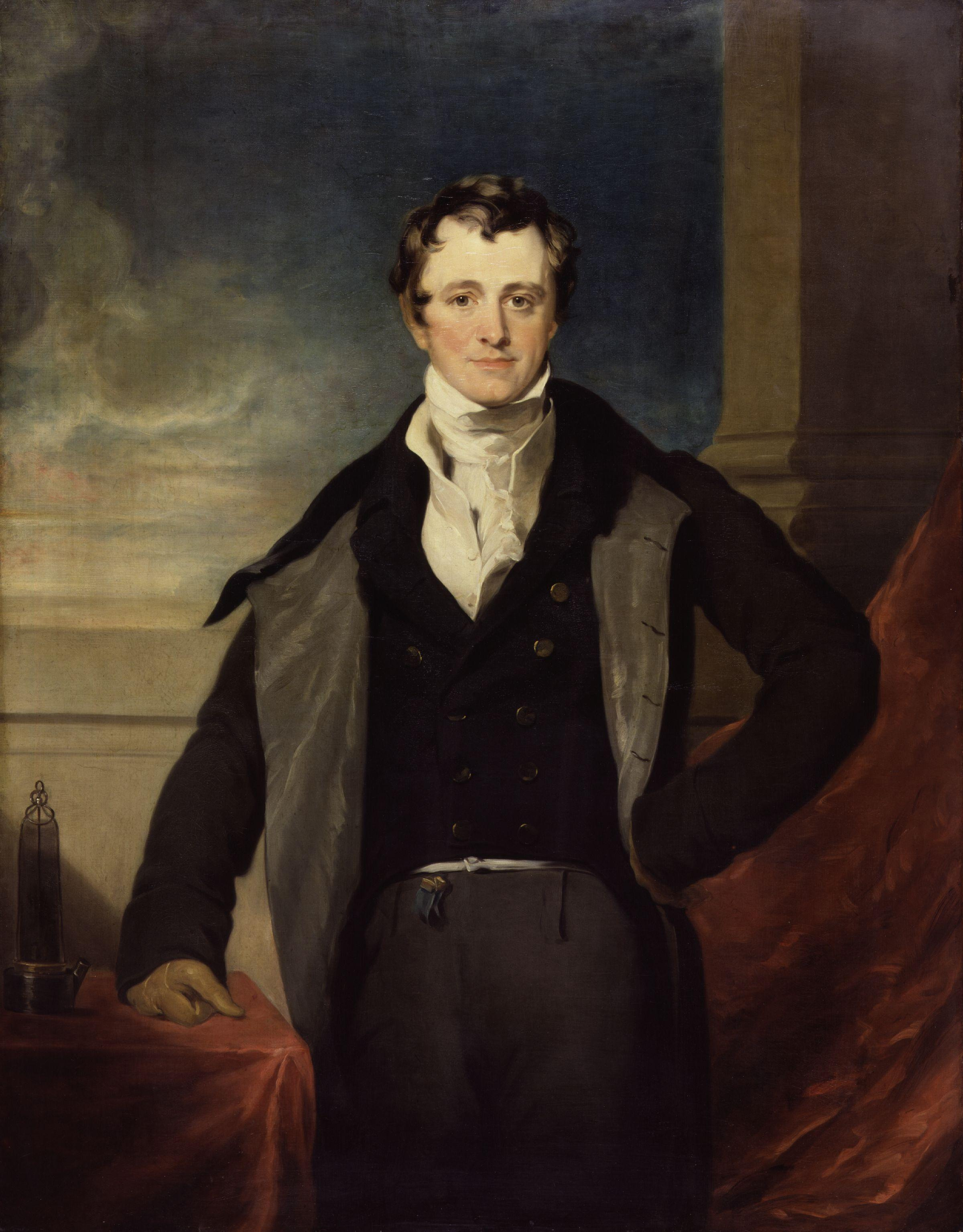
Humphry Davy

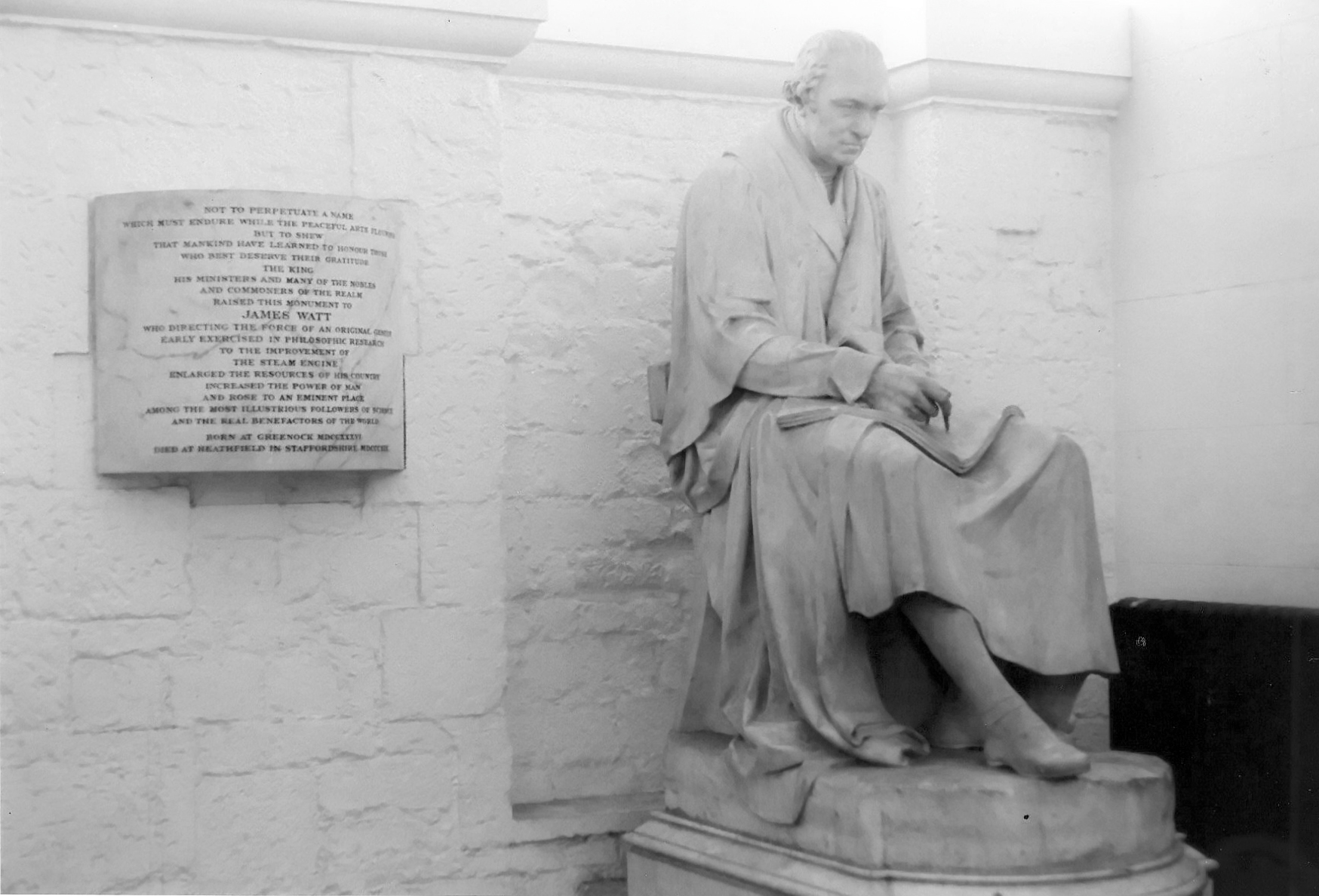
James Watt

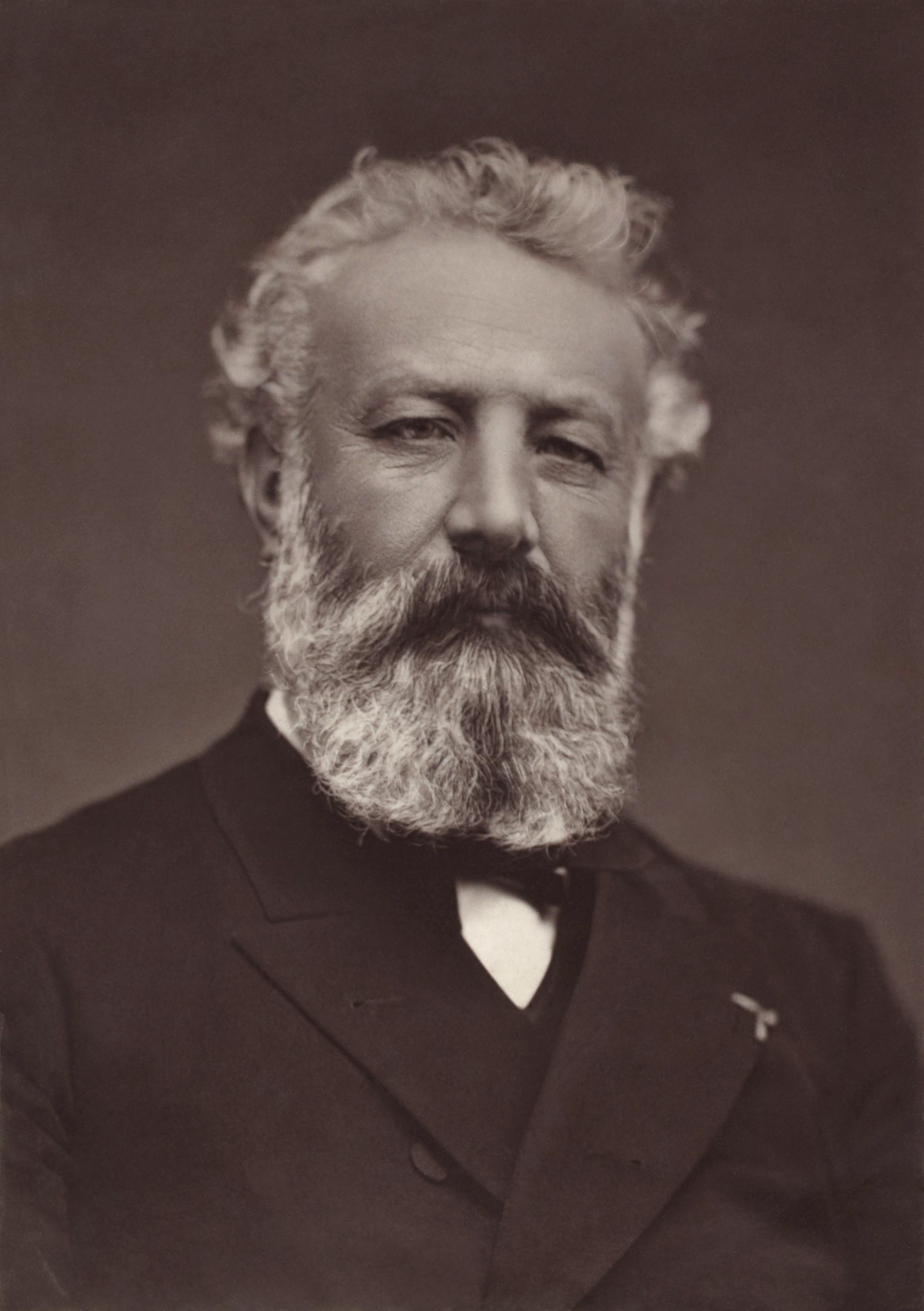
Jules Verne

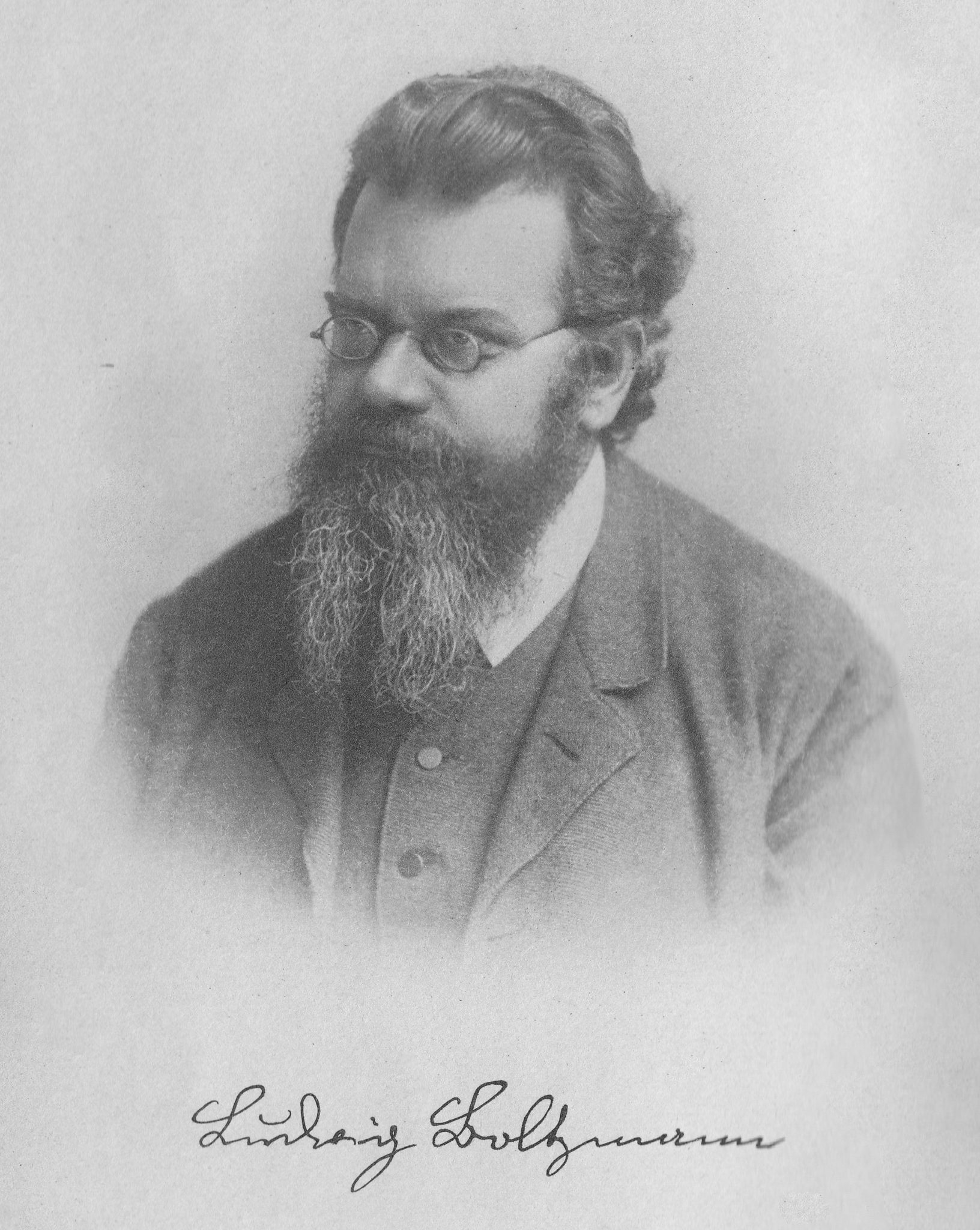
Ludwig Boltzmann

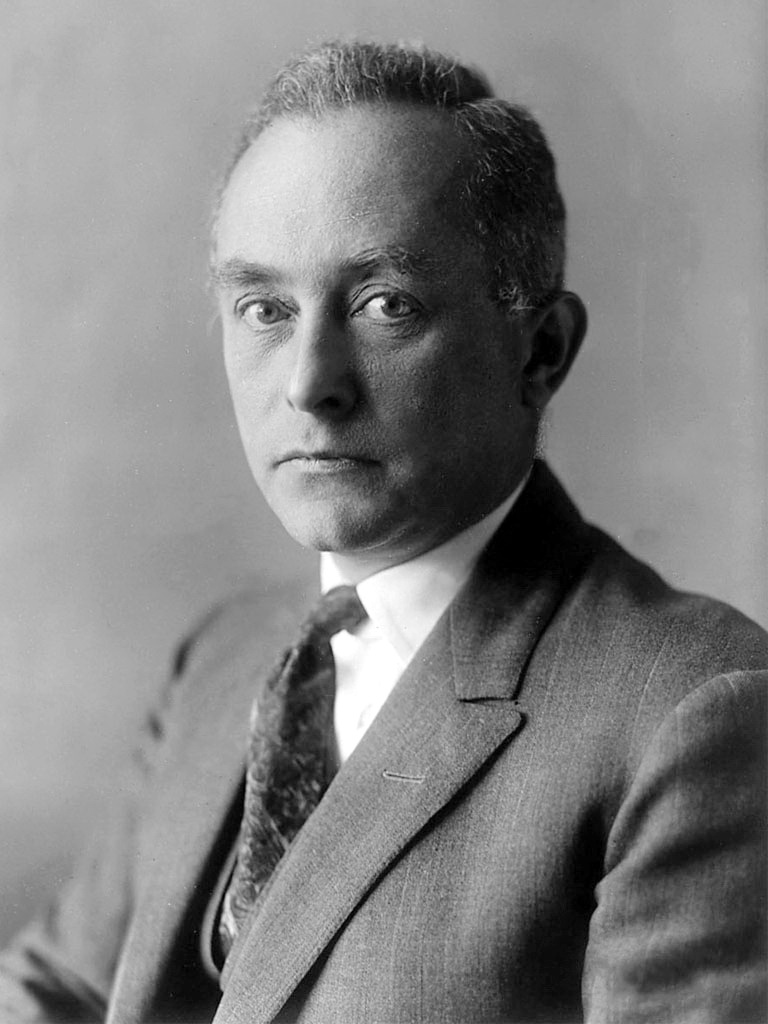
Max Born

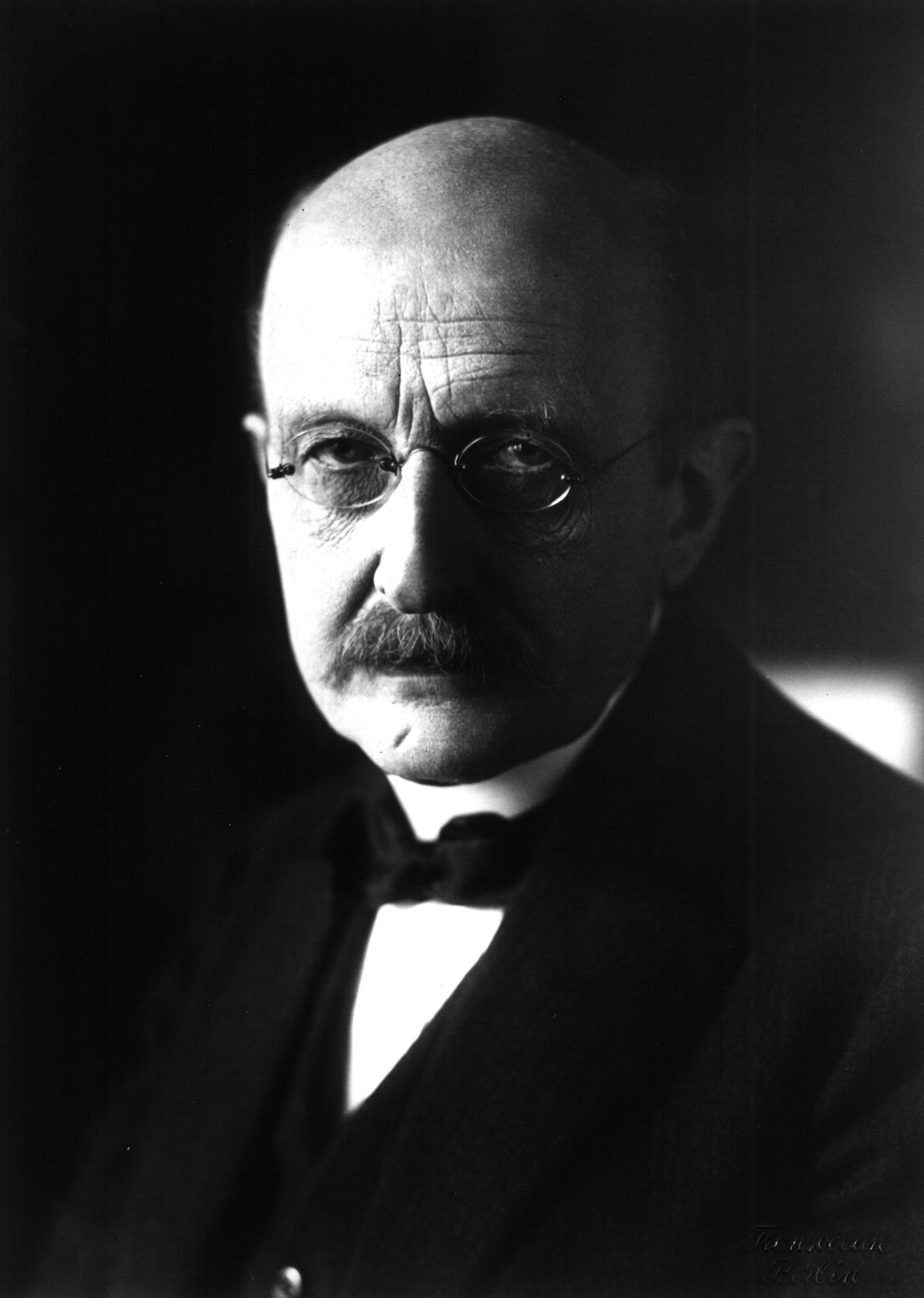
Max Planck

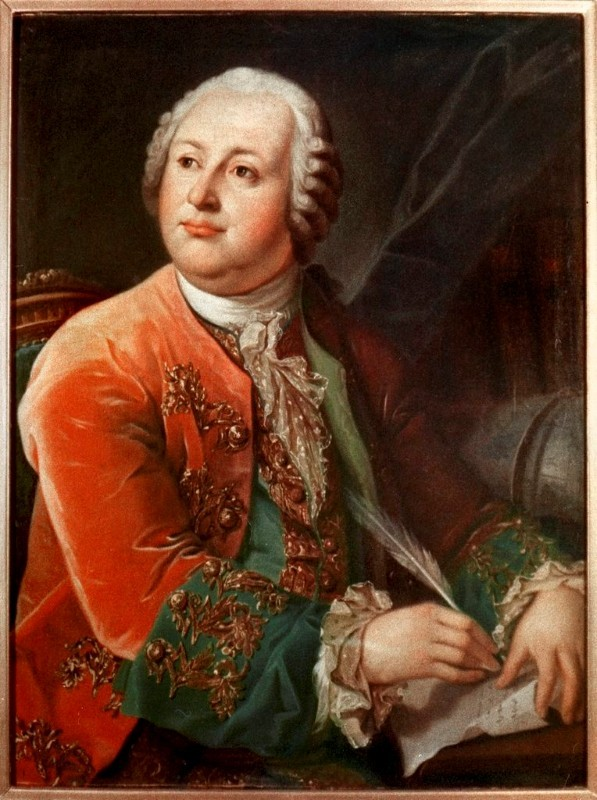
Mikhail Lomonosov

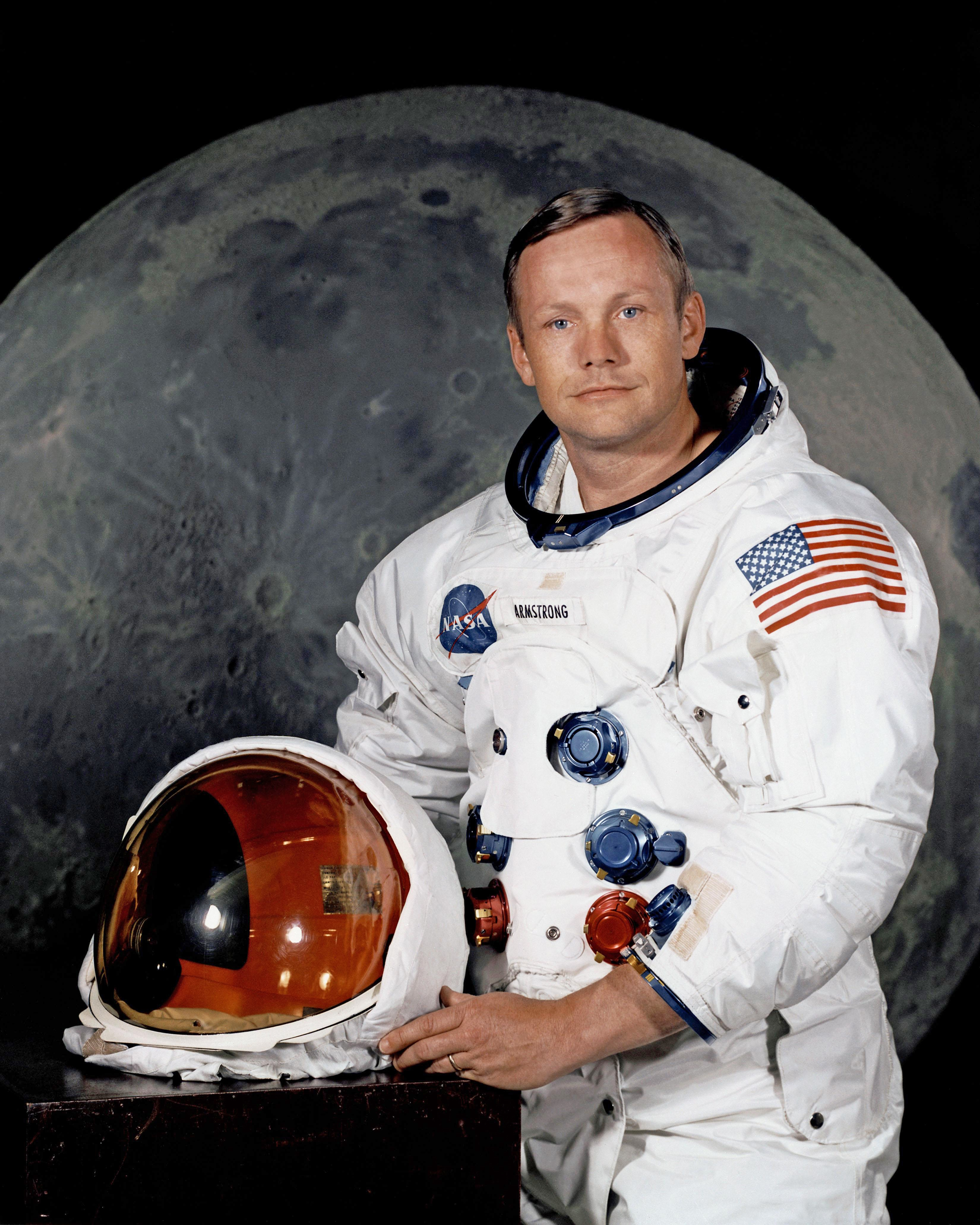
Neil Armstrong

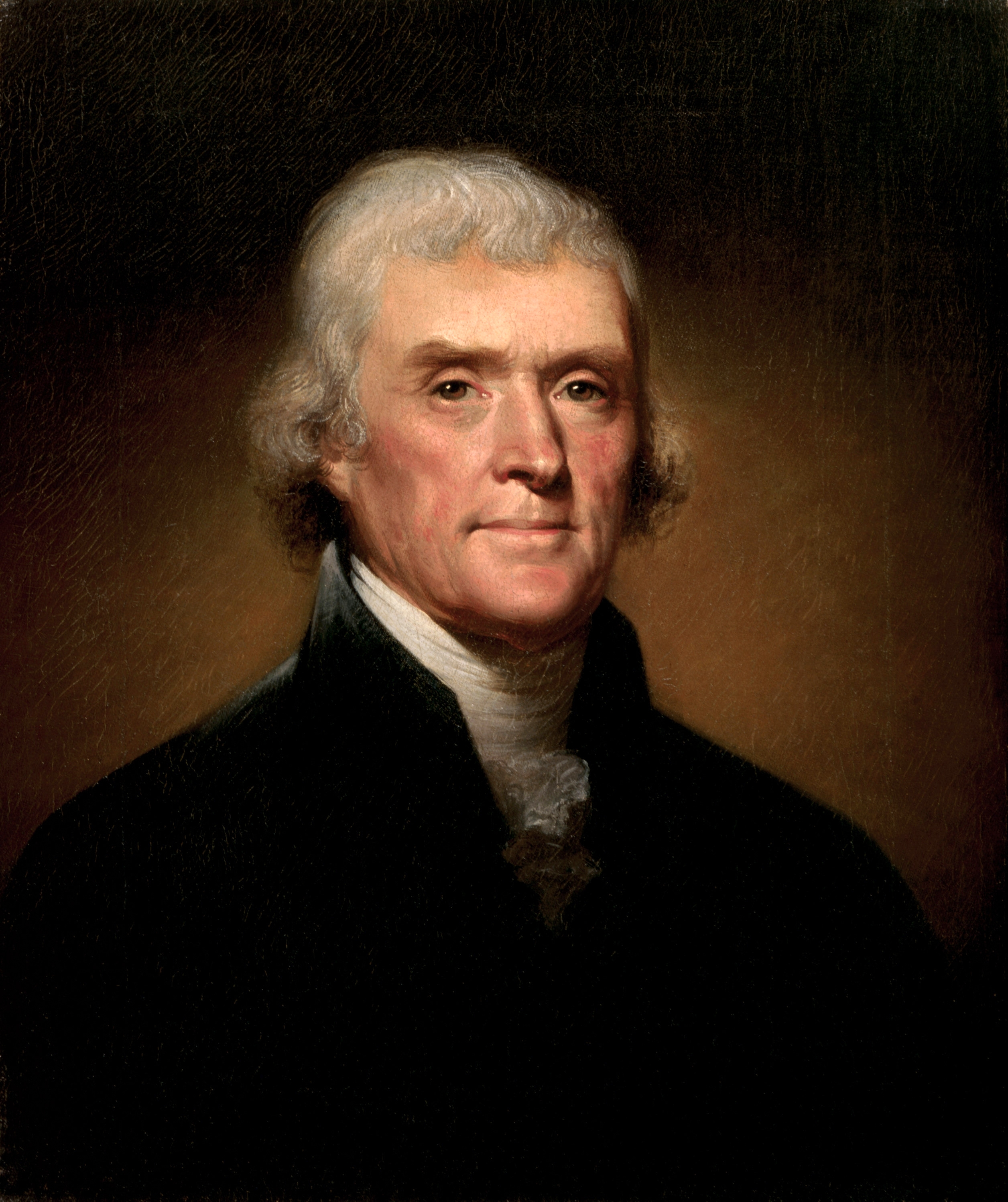
Thomas Jefferson

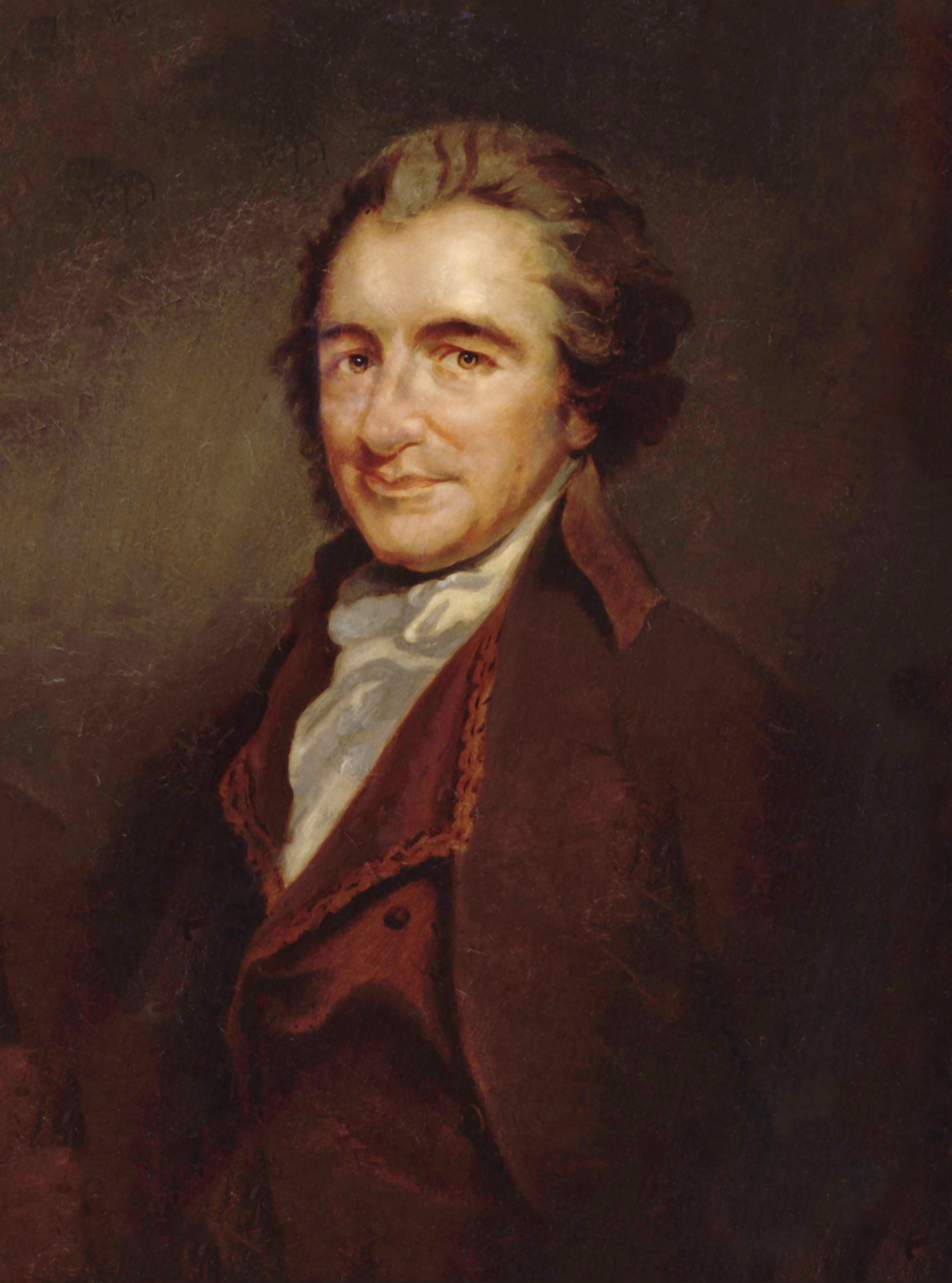
Thomas Paine

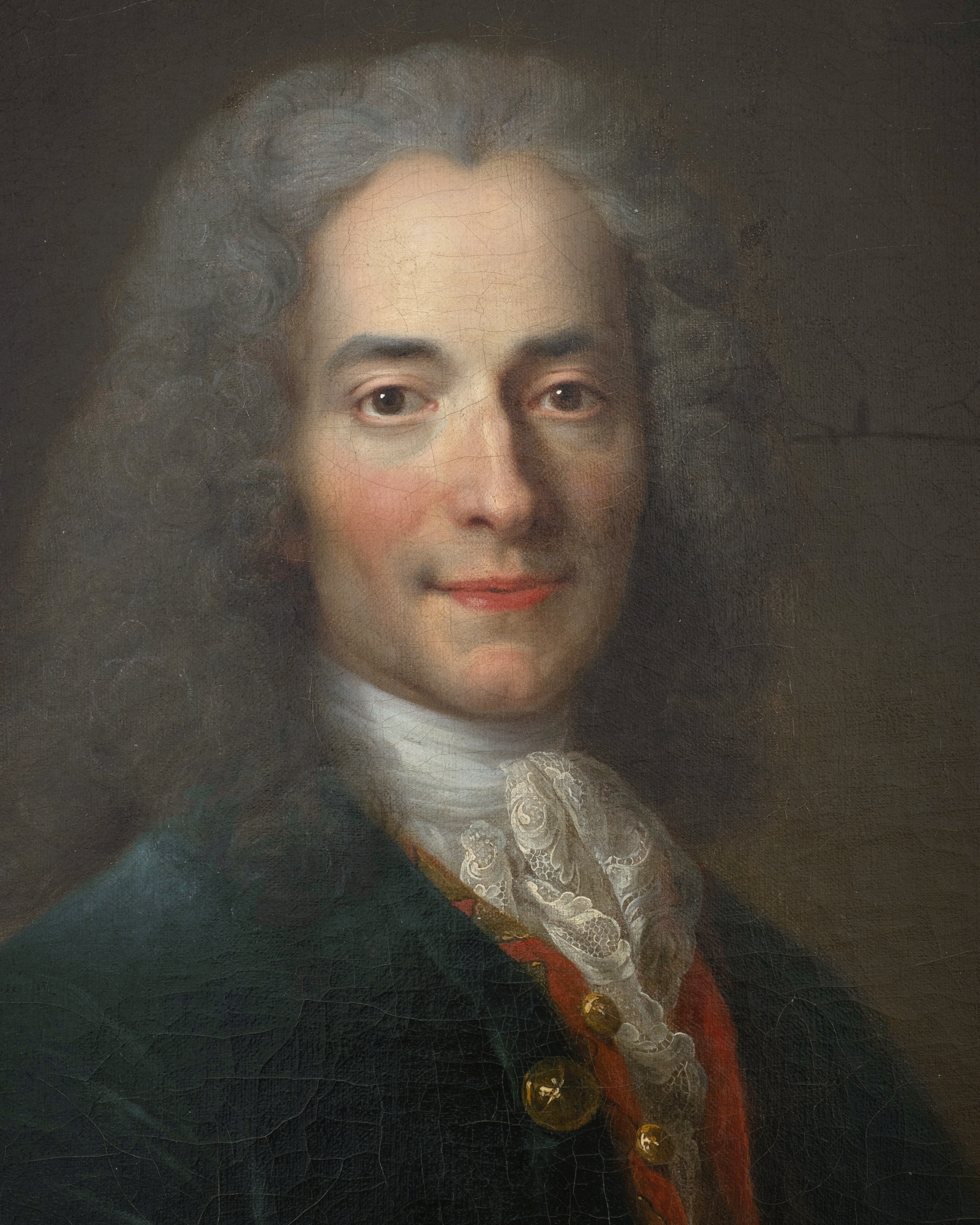
Voltaire

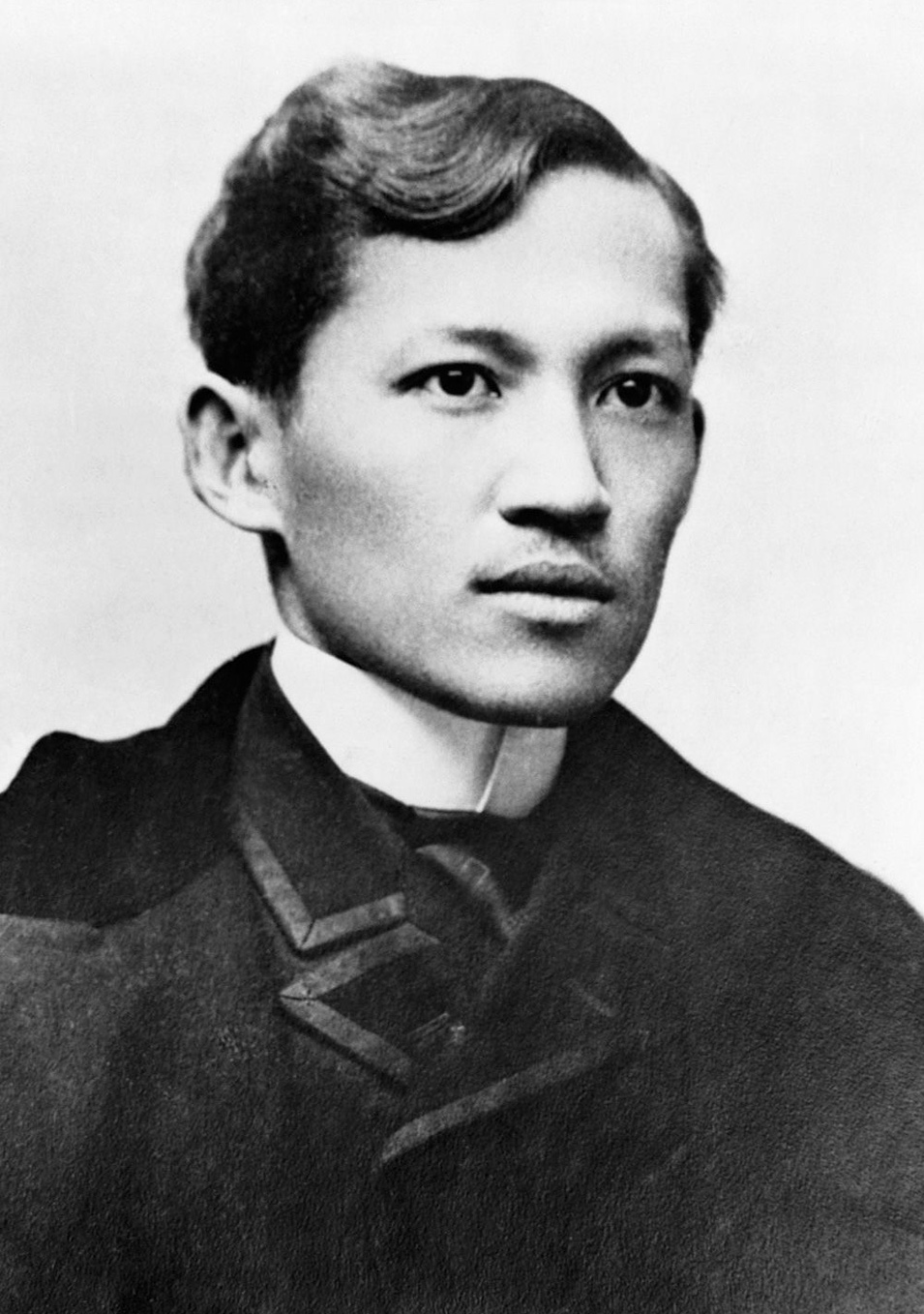
José Rizal

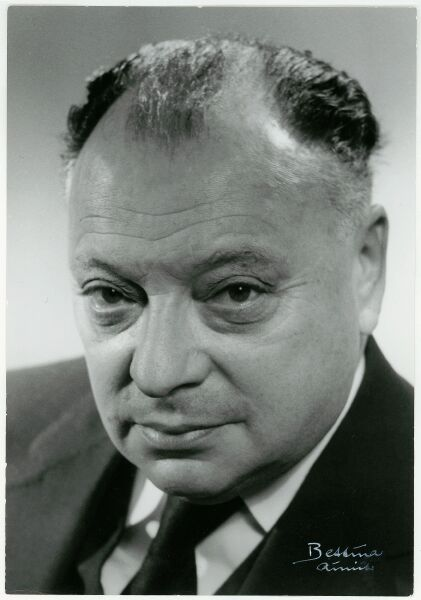
Wolfgang Pauli

This is a partial list of people who have been categorized as Deists, the belief in a deity based on natural religion only, or belief in religious truths discovered by people through a process of reasoning, independent of any revelation through scriptures or prophets. They have been selected for their influence on Deism or for their notability in other areas.

== Born before 1700 ==
- Al-Maʿarri (973–1058), was a blind Arab philosopher, poet and writer, and a controversial rationalist.
- Leonardo da Vinci (1452–1519), Italian Renaissance polymath: painter, sculptor, architect, musician, scientist, mathematician, engineer, inventor, anatomist, geologist, cartographer, botanist, and writer. Described as a deist by some sources, most historians have deemed him a Roman Catholic.
- Edward Herbert, 1st Baron Herbert of Cherbury (1583–1648), British soldier, diplomat, historian, poet and religious philosopher
- Gottfried Leibniz (1646–1716), German mathematician and philosopher. He is best known for developing infinitesimal calculus independently of Isaac Newton, and his mathematical notation has been widely used ever since it was published. He has also been labeled a Christian as well.
- Matthew Tindal (1657–1733), controversial English author whose works were influential on Enlightenment thinking
- Voltaire (1694–1778), French Enlightenment writer and philosopher
- William Hogarth (1697–1764), English painter, visual artist and pioneering cartoonist
- Colin Maclaurin (1698–1746), Scottish mathematician who made important contributions to geometry and algebra. The Maclaurin series, a special case of the Taylor series, are named after him.

== Born 1700–1800 ==
- Benjamin Franklin (1706–1790), American polymath; one of the Founding Fathers of the United States
- Émilie du Châtelet (1706–1749), French mathematician, physicist, and author during the Age of Enlightenment. Her crowning achievement is considered to be her translation and commentary on Isaac Newton's work Principia Mathematica.
- Mikhail Lomonosov (1711–1765), Russian polymath, scientist and writer, who made important contributions to literature, education, and science. Among his discoveries was the atmosphere of Venus. His spheres of science were natural science, chemistry, physics, mineralogy, history, art, philology, optical devices and others. Lomonosov was also a poet and influenced the formation of the modern Russian literary language.
- Jean le Rond d'Alembert (1717–1783), French mathematician, mechanician, physicist, philosopher, and music theorist. He was also co-editor with Denis Diderot of the Encyclopédie.
- Adam Smith (1723–1790), Scottish philosopher and economist; considered the father of modern economics
- James Hutton (1726–1797), Scottish physician, geologist, naturalist, chemical manufacturer and experimental agriculturalist. His work helped to establish the basis of modern geology. His theories of geology and geologic time, also called deep time, came to be included in theories which were called plutonism and uniformitarianism.
- Gotthold Ephraim Lessing (1729–1781), German writer, philosopher, dramatist, publicist, and art critic
- Moses Mendelssohn (1729–1796), German philosopher influential in the Jewish Haskalah
- James Watt (1736–1819), Scottish inventor and mechanical engineer whose improvements to the Newcomen steam engine were fundamental to the changes brought by the Industrial Revolution in both his native Great Britain and the rest of the world.
- Thomas Paine (1737–1809), English pamphleteer, revolutionary, radical, inventor, and intellectual, and one of the Founding Fathers of the United States
- Ethan Allen (1738–89), early American revolutionary and guerrilla leader
- Thomas Jefferson (1743–1826), author of the Jefferson Bible, an American Founding Father, the principal author of the U.S. Declaration of Independence, and the third President of the United States.
- Jean-Baptiste Lamarck (1744–1829), French naturalist. He was a soldier, biologist, academic, and an early proponent of the idea that evolution occurred and proceeded in accordance with natural laws.
- Johann Adam Weishaupt (1748–1830), Bavarian philosopher, canon law professor and founder of the Illuminati
- James Madison (1751–1836), "Father of the United States Constitution", one of the Founding Fathers of the United States, and the 4th President of the United States
- James Monroe (1758–1831), Founding Father of the United States and fifth president of the United States; held various other roles in the government of the United States. Monroe almost never discussed religion but used Deist language in speeches and was a Freemason, who were largely Deists at the time.
- Friedrich Schiller (1759–1805), German poet, philosopher, historian, and playwright.
- Maximilien Robespierre (1758–1794), French revolutionary and lawyer
- Elihu Palmer (1764–1806), American author and advocate of deism
- Carl Friedrich Gauss (1777–1855), German mathematician and physical scientist who contributed significantly to many fields, including number theory, statistics, analysis, differential geometry, geodesy, geophysics, electrostatics, astronomy and optics.
- Humphry Davy (1778–1829), British chemist and inventor.
- Charles Lyell (1797–1875), British lawyer and the foremost geologist of his day. He is best known as the author of Principles of Geology, which popularised James Hutton's concepts of uniformitarianism.

== Born 1800–1900 ==
- Victor Hugo (1802–1885), French writer, artist, activist and statesman
- William Lloyd Garrison (1805–1879), American abolitionist, journalist, and social reformer. He is best known as the editor of the abolitionist newspaper The Liberator, and was one of the founders of the American Anti-Slavery Society, he promoted "immediate emancipation" of slaves in the United States.
- Lysander Spooner (1808–1887), American anarchist, philosopher and abolitionist
- Henrik Wergeland (1808–1845), Norwegian poet and theologist (by self-definition).
- Abraham Lincoln (1809–1865), sixteenth president of the United States. He never joined any church and has been described as a "Christian deist". As a young man, he was religiously skeptical and sometimes ridiculed revivalists. During his early years, Lincoln enjoyed reading the works of deists such as Thomas Paine and Voltaire. He drafted a pamphlet incorporating such ideas but did not publish it. After charges of hostility to Christianity almost cost him a congressional bid, he kept his unorthodox beliefs private. James Adams labelled Lincoln as a deist. In 1834, Lincoln reportedly wrote a manuscript essay challenging Christianity modelled on Paine's book The Age of Reason, which a friend supposedly burned to protect him from ridicule. He seemed to believe in an all-powerful God, who shaped events and, by 1865, was expressing those beliefs in major speeches.
- Jules Verne (1828–1905), French author who pioneered the science fiction genre in Europe. He is best known for his novels Twenty Thousand Leagues Under the Seas, Journey to the Center of the Earth, and Around the World in Eighty Days.
- Dmitri Mendeleev (1834–1907), Russian chemist and inventor. He is credited as being the creator of the first version of the periodic table of elements.
- Simon Newcomb (1835–1909), Canadian-American astronomer and mathematician.
- Mark Twain (1835–1910), American author and humorist
- Alfred M. Mayer (1836–1897), American physicist.
- Charles Sanders Peirce (1839–1914), American philosopher, logician, mathematician, and scientist, sometimes known as "the father of pragmatism". He was educated as a chemist and employed as a scientist for 30 years. Today he is appreciated largely for his contributions to logic, mathematics, philosophy, scientific methodology, and semiotics, and for his founding of pragmatism.
- Ludwig Boltzmann (1844–1906), Austrian physicist famous for his founding contributions in the fields of statistical mechanics and statistical thermodynamics.
- Thomas Alva Edison (1847–1931), American inventor and businessman.
- Max Planck (1858–1947), German physicist, regarded as the founder of quantum theory.
- José Rizal (1861–1896), a Filipino patriot, philosopher, medical doctor, poet, journalist, novelist, political scientist, painter and polyglot. Considered to be one of the Philippines' most important heroes and martyrs whose writings and execution contributed to the igniting of the Philippine Revolution. He is also considered as Asia's first modern non-violent proponent of freedom.
- Ernest Rutherford (1871–1937), New Zealand chemist and "father" of nuclear physics, who was awarded the Nobel Prize in Chemistry in 1908 "for his investigations into the disintegration of the elements, and the chemistry of radioactive substances".
- Max Born (1882–1970), German-British physicist and mathematician who was instrumental in the development of quantum mechanics. He also made contributions to solid-state physics and optics and supervised the work of a number of notable physicists in the 1920s and 30s. Born won the 1954 Nobel Prize in Physics (shared with Walther Bothe).
- Hermann Weyl (1885–1955), German mathematician and theoretical physicist.

== Born after 1900 ==
- Wolfgang Pauli (1900–1958), Austrian theoretical physicist. In 1945, he received the Nobel Prize in Physics. He is best known for his work on Pauli principle and spin theory.
- Luis Walter Alvarez (1911–1988), American experimental physicist and inventor, who spent nearly all of his long professional career on the faculty of the University of California, Berkeley. He was awarded the Nobel Prize in Physics in 1968, and took out over 40 patents, some of which led to commercial products.
- Martin Gardner (1914–2010), American popular mathematics and science writer specializing in recreational mathematics, but with interests encompassing micromagic, stage magic, literature (especially the writings of Lewis Carroll and G. K. Chesterton), philosophy, scientific skepticism, and religion.
- Antony Flew (1923–2010), British analytic philosopher and prominent former atheist; during his last years he openly made an allegiance to Deism and stated to have acknowledged the existence of an Intelligent Creator of the universe, the Aristotelian God.
- Walter Kohn (1923–2016), Austrian-born American theoretical physicist. He was awarded, along with John Pople, the Nobel Prize in Chemistry in 1998.
- Harish-Chandra (1923–1983), Indian mathematician, who did fundamental work in representation theory, especially Harmonic analysis on semisimple Lie groups.
- Neil Armstrong (1930–2012), American NASA astronaut, test pilot, aerospace engineer, university professor, United States Naval Aviator, and the first person to set foot upon the Moon.
- James Heckman (born 1944), American economist who shared the Nobel Memorial Prize in Economic Sciences in 2000 for his pioneering work in econometrics and microeconomics.
- Paul Davies (born 1946), British physicist, science writer and broadcaster
- Nick Cave (born 1957), Australian musician, songwriter, poet, author and actor.
- Brett Gurewitz (born 1962), guitarist and songwriter for the American punk rock band Bad Religion
- Tammy Duckworth (born 1968), United States Senator for Illinois, member of United States House of Representatives, Army National Guard lieutenant colonel
- Harmony Korine (born 1973), American film director, producer, screenwriter, and author.
- Rosalia (Born 1992) Spanish singer.

== See also ==
- List of people by belief
