= Mark Finley =

American Seventh-day Adventist evangelist (born 1945)

Personal details
- Born: July 23, 1945 (age 81) Norwich, Connecticut, U.S.
- Spouse: Ernestine Finley
- Children: 3
- Occupation: Pastor; Evangelist; Author

Mark A. Finley (born July 23, 1945) is an American former host and director of It Is Written (from 1991–2004), for which he traveled around the world as a televangelist. He was the first Seventh-day Adventist pastor to do a satellite evangelistic series. Mark Finley currently serves as Assistant to the President of the General Conference, appointed at the 2010 General Conference Session in Atlanta. As assistant to the president he to work with evangelism and television as his primary portfolio. Prior to this he became and served as one vice-president out of nine for the Seventh-day Adventist Church. He served nearly two years as general field secretary at the world headquarters, directing the Center for Global Evangelism.

== Life and career ==
Finley's mother was Catholic, and his father was Protestant, with Finley being raised Catholic. Finley was baptized in March 1963. He studied theology at Atlantic Union College (AUC) in South Lancaster, Massachusetts.

Pastor Finley and his wife "started and nurtured" the Living Hope Seventh-day Adventist Community Church, located in Haymarket, Virginia.

== Books ==
- 2000 and Beyond
- End Time Living
- The Next Superpower
- Satisfied
- Solid Ground
- Studying Together
- Thirteen Life-Changing Secrets
- Revelation's Predictions for a New Millennium

Books co-authored with Steven R. Mosley:

- A Religion that Works
- Confidence Amid Chaos
- Faith Against the Odds
- Jerusalem Showdown
- Hope for a New Century
- Looking for God in all the Wrong Places
- Questioning the Supernatural
- Revelation's Three Most Wanted
- Unshakable Faith
- When Faith Crumbles
- Why So Many Denominations?

Books co-authored with George Vandeman, the founder of It Is Written:

- The Overcomers

== See also ==
- Seventh-day Adventist Church
- General Conference of Seventh-day Adventists
- It Is Written
