= It Is Written =

Seventh-day Adventist Christian television program

- Genre: Religious broadcasting
- Created by: George Vandeman
- Presented by: George Vandeman (1956–1991); Mark Finley (1991–2004); Shawn Boonstra (2004–2011); John Bradshaw (2011–present)
- Country of origin: United States

Production
- Production locations: Thousand Oaks, California (1956–1995); Simi Valley, California (1995–2014); Chattanooga, Tennessee (2014–present)
- Running time: 30 minutes

Original release
- Release: March 1956 – present

It Is Written is an internationally broadcast Seventh-day Adventist Christian television program founded in 1956 by George Vandeman. Its title comes from the Gospel of Matthew: "It is written, 'Man shall not live by bread alone, but by every word that proceeds out of the mouth of God.'" The programs are produced by the Adventist Media Center in California.

== History ==
The program aired in March 1956 with founder Pastor George Vandeman as speaker. Over the next half-century, It Is Written grew exponentially. Vandeman's live "Revelation Seminars" attracted tens of thousands of eager visitors, and the telecast entered millions of homes in numerous countries.

In 1991, Vandeman retired, and Pastor Mark Finley accepted the position as the ministry's new speaker/director; in 1995 he added a satellite evangelistic series called NET '95.

NET '96 followed one year later, and whereas NET '95 had targeted North America, NET '96 reached the world with messages in 13 languages. It is estimated that 2,200 churches from 45 countries participated in at least one of the NETs, and more than 30,000 people were baptized at the conclusion of the meetings.

The next major It Is Written satellite effort took place from 1999 through 2001 with ACTS 2000, when the ministry covered the entire globe with multiple satellite meetings. Pastor Finley conducted a total of 10 series to a combined audience of 3 million people.

By this time, It Is Written maintained its rank as one of the top 10 religious programs in North America and received more than 30 awards for excellence in programming.

Pastor Shawn Boonstra became the third speaker/director January 2005. Finley passed the mantle to Boonstra with his blessing.

Pastor Boonstra came to the It Is Written headquarters from It Is Written Canada, where he had served as speaker/director for four years. Boonstra joined the Adventist Church after attending an It Is Written evangelistic series.

Pastor Boonstra's Revelation Speaks Peace evangelistic series in cities like Phoenix, Portland, Los Angeles, India, and Rome energized attendees and church members alike with the hope in Christ that is revealed through the final book of the Bible.

In January 2011, Pastor John Bradshaw was named new speaker/director for It Is Written.

In May 2011, Bradshaw conducted a short series live from Las Vegas called Babylon Rising. This effort was broadcast worldwide via satellite and the Internet. Following the success of the Babylon Rising series, Bradshaw presented a month-long series called Revelation Today live from the Cashman Center in Las Vegas in January 2012. He followed this series with meetings in Paris, Dayton, Southern Mexico, Costa Rica, Prague, New York, Charlotte and more.

== Ministry facts ==
It Is Written can be viewed each week in approximately 7,000 cities in the United States and 700 cities in Canada. The telecast's reach extends to at least 140 countries. An average of 1.5 million people view the North American telecast each week and the program consistently ranks as one of the top 10 religious programs in the United States according to the Nielsen ratings.

In addition to broadcasting on regular network and cable stations, the telecast regularly airs on six satellite networks: Trinity Broadcasting Network, the Hope Channel, and 3ABN.

It Is Written has an inventory of over 1,100 recorded programs, with at least 36 new broadcasts produced each year. Over the last 50 years, the ministry has received 30 Angel Awards, 10 Telly Awards, and three Aurora Awards.

== Outreach ==
In 2004, It Is Written—in conjunction with the Joni and Friends ministry—shipped wheelchairs to Rwanda in an effort to assist with a shortage in local hospitals.

The ministry partnered with the Pilgrim Relief Society in 2006 to deliver 1,500 "Godpods" to the San people of the Kalahari Desert. Since the San people have no written language, these solar-powered devices—which are the size of a garage door opener—contain the entire Bible in the clicking San language. In addition to this Bible project, It Is Written is also building solar-powered water wells to help the San people combat the problem of dehydration.

In 2007, It Is Written traveled to the Arctic to deliver hundreds of Bibles in Inuktitut to Inuit who live in remote areas.

== It Is Written on the internet ==
It Is Written became one of the first Christian television programs to broadcast free video podcasts via iTunes in 2006.

On Sept. 3, 2007, the ministry launched a daily (Monday – Friday) internet-based devotional program called A Better Way to Live. The tagline for the online program is "A daily spiritual boost for busy people" and in each program, Boonstra takes one Bible verse and applies it to daily life.

This was followed by Bradshaw's launch of a daily one-minute "Every Word" devotional in 2011.

It Is Written TV network is available on Internet, Apple TV (current and future models), Roku, Amazon Fire TV and other means.

== It Is Written on mobile ==
It Is Written offers email sign-ups, gifting opportunities, access to weekly programs and more, via its mobile presence. In 2011, the mobile site won both a Silver W3 Award and a Silver Davey Award in the category of Best Mobile Website. The mobile site was designed and developed by Trinet Internet Solutions.

== See also ==
- Media ministries of the Seventh-day Adventist Church
- Seventh-day Adventist Church
- List of longest-running United States television series
