= George Vandeman =

Seventh-day Adventist evangelist

- Born: George Edward Vandeman; October 21, 1916; Pueblo, Colorado, United States
- Died: November 3, 2000 (aged 84); Newbury Park, California, United States
- Education: University of Michigan

George Edward Vandeman (October 21, 1916 – November 3, 2000) was a Seventh-day Adventist evangelist who founded the It Is Written television ministry.

== Biography ==
Vandeman was born on October 21, 1916. At the age of 21, he attended Emmanuel Missionary College in Berrien Springs, Michigan. He found a job working at a weekly 15-minute radio broadcast in Elkhart, Indiana. While there, he met Nellie Johnson and they were married the following year on October 2, 1938, in South Bend, Indiana. After completing his second year of college, Vandeman began working as a full-time evangelist. During a series of meetings in Muncie, Indiana, Nellie gave birth to their first child, George Jr. The birth of their sons Richard and Robert soon followed. The Vandeman's fourth child, Connie, was born in 1956.

Vandeman received his Master of Arts degree in speech and communication from the University of Michigan. His 1946 thesis was entitled, "Spurgeon's theory of preaching". He was then ordained as a minister, and worked as a field instructor in evangelism at Emmanuel Missionary College for four years. He then joined the Ministerial Association at the General Conference (world headquarters of the church) in 1947, taking the position of associate secretary, and at age 33 becoming one of the youngest to work in Adventist church leadership.

In the years following World War II, Vandeman and other charismatic Adventist speakers like Fordyce Detamore spearheaded a drive for the public evangelism of major cities. He conducted campaigns in Pittsburgh in 1948, Washington, D.C., in 1951 and London in 1952, amongst other places.

=== It Is Written ===
After returning from a mission project in England, he was asked by the new General Conference President Reuben Richard Figuhr to continue with the Christian television program. Six years earlier then-president James Lamar McElhany had convinced Vandeman to try television as a means of reaching others with the Gospel. As such, he created a six-month experimental evangelistic effort for television. At the time, he wasn't able to get the financial support he needed, and temporarily put the effort on hold.

In the mid-1950s Vandeman started work on a series of television programs called "It Is Written", which he planned to air for several weeks in an area as a warmup to an evangelistic program. In spring 1956, It Is Written launched its first telecast in black and white—a full-message, Bible study telecast in Washington, D.C. The program later became one of the first religious television programs to air in color. The program's title was based on the Bible verse Matthew 4:4, "It is written, man shall not live by bread alone, but by every word that proceeds out of the mouth of God."

Vandeman ran the first It Is Written campaign in Fresno, California, in 1958, and later in Washington, D.C., Detroit, Philadelphia and other cities. The telecast was launched to all of California in 1962, and this effort was followed by a month-long series at the Los Angeles Memorial Sports Arena. By the mid-1960s it was being broadcast internationally on a weekly basis.

In 1971, the It Is Written production studios moved to the Adventist Media Center in Thousand Oaks, California. In 1975, Vandeman began conducting Revelation Seminars. The seminars consisted of a one-day, eight-hour Bible study followed by a luncheon. Over a course of 10 years, tens of thousands of It Is Written viewers traveled hundreds of miles to attend one of 300 seminars.

In 1979, the ministry's success was noted by Excellence In Media, a non-profit organization dedicated to promoting excellent family-oriented programs by honoring media with Angel Awards. Vandeman and the It Is Written team were given their first Angel award. They would ultimately receive a total of 10 Angel Awards from Religion in Media. Vandeman was later presented with an International Distinguished Achievement Gold Angel award — Excellence in Media's highest honor. In 1980 he received the Religious Heritage of America Faith and Freedom Award for Television Religious Personality of the Year. He was a member of Religious Heritage of America, the Strategy for the Elevation of People Foundation, and the Year of the Bible Committee. Vandeman was invited to presidential briefings during both the Reagan and Bush administrations.

By the 1980s, It Is Written had more than 600,000 regular viewers. That number surpassed 1.5 million in the 90s. In 1990, the It Is Written production team and Vandeman traveled to the Soviet Union to tape "Empires in Collision," an eight-part series. It Is Written was one of the first religious telecasts to be aired on Soviet television. In 2000 it was broadcast in 8 languages to over 150 countries. It was a "pioneering force" in Adventist evangelism.

One of his most popular series was "What I like about...", which investigated shared beliefs between Adventists and Baptists, Methodists, Catholics, charismatics and others. See: Seventh-day Adventist interfaith relations.

Vandeman founded the New Gallery Centre in London.

He served as the primary speaker of It Is Written until his retirement in 1991, when Mark Finley succeeded him. He died on November 3, 2000, at age 84, at his home in Newbury Park, California of heart failure while asleep. He was survived by his wife, Nellie of Camarillo, California, and by children George Jr., Bob, Ron, and Connie Vandeman Jeffery.

According to Paul Harvey,

"George Vandeman has completed his earthly ministry in his 84th year. When the roll is called up yonder, and you and I hear that gently persuasive voice again...we'll know we made it to the right place."

=== Style ===
According to one report,

"Vandeman's warm voice defined a new approach for religious television. Instead of preaching, he quietly shared insights from God's Word to meet people's needs."

According to Paul Harvey,

"[Planet in Rebellion] impacted my life so constructively."

According to Mark Finley,

"George Vandeman was a visionary who often was far ahead of his time". "He had the unique ability to see possibilities where others saw only problems. George had the ability to communicate to people at all levels, but he especially ministered to people who are highly educated, affluent, and in upper echelons of society. He seemed to understand their heartaches, their longings, and their basic human needs."

== Publications ==
- Touch and Live (1958)
- Planet in Rebellion (1960, revised edition 1965)
- A Day to Remember (1965)
- Destination Life (1966)
- Look! No Doomsday! (1970)
- Papa, are you going to die? from stress? from smoking? or in your favorite chair? (1970)
- Hammers in the Fire, and What Wore the Hammers Out (1971)
- I Met a Miracle (1965, revised edition 1971)
- Psychic Roulette (c. 1973)
- Is Anybody Driving? (1975)
- Sail Your Own Seas (1975)
- The Day the Cat Jumped (1978)
- How to Burn Your Candle (1978)
- How to Live With a Tiger (1978)
- The Impersonation Game (1978)
- Tying Down the Sun (1978)
- Showdown in the Middle East (1980)
- The Book That Would Not Go Away (1983)
- The Cry of a Lonely Planet (1983)
- Amazing Prophecies (1986)
- Life After Death (1986)
- The Rise and Fall of Antichrist in the Prophecies of Revelation (1986)
- Truth or Propaganda (1986)
- What I Like About-- (1986)
- Your Family and Your Health (1986)
- Showdown at Armageddon (1987)
- When God Made Rest (1987)
- Empires in Collision (1988)
- Decade of Destiny (1989)
- Lost at birth: Saved by miracle (1990)
- Comrades in Christ (1991)
- The Overcomers (1992)
- My Dream: Memoirs of a One-of-a-kind Disciple (1995)
- Happiness Wall to Wall: Your Right to Enjoy (web page)
- Faith Lift (web page)

== See also ==
- Seventh-day Adventist Church
- Ellen G. White
- Adventism
- Adventist Health Studies
- Seventh-day Adventist Church Pioneers
- Seventh-day Adventist eschatology
- Seventh-day Adventist theology
- Seventh-day Adventist worship
- It Is Written
