= Samuel Clapham =

English clergyman, justice of the peace, and writer (1755–1830)

- Born: 1755; Leeds
- Died: 1 June 1830 (aged 74–75); Sidmouth
- Occupation: clergyman
- Children: James Murray Clapham (died 1809)
- Writing career
- Pen name: Theophilus St. John
- Period: Georgian
- Genre: sermon
- Notable work: Practical Sermons on Several Important Subjects

Samuel Clapham (1755–1830) was a clergyman of the Church of England, a justice of the peace, and a writer. His best known work, the collection Practical Sermons on Several Important Subjects, published under the pseudonym Theophilus St. John, went through four editions (1803, 1804, 1808, 1812).

== Life ==
Samuel Clapham was born in Leeds on 27 February 1755 to John and Elizabeth Clapham (née Rook). He was the 3rd of 4 children (John, Betty, Samuel and William). He graduated B.A. from Clare Hall, Cambridge in 1778, taking the M.A. in 1784. During the course of his studies he was ordained deacon at London on 21 September 1777, and ordained priest at York on 6 October 1782.

He became curate of Yarm, Yorkshire, in 1790, vicar of Great Ouseburn, Yorkshire, in 1797, and of Christchurch, then in Hampshire, in 1802, and rector of Gussage St Michael, Dorsetshire, in 1806. In the course of his clerical career, Clapham published several sermons. One of these, How far Methodism conduces to the interests of Christianity, and the welfare of society: impartially considered (1794), elicited the response Methodism vindicated from the charge of ignorance and enthusiasm, a reply to a sermon preached by S. Clapham, published at Margate in 1795.

Clapham also served as a county magistrate in Hampshire for twenty-five years. One of his works, Collection of the Several Points of Sessions' Law (1818), was a digest of material relating to the powers and responsibilities of a justice of quarter sessions. The work drew particularly critical notice as an amateur compendium which, among other mistakes, stated that no case could be brought for verbal slander against a woman.

In later life, Clapham retired to Sidmouth for his health, and he died there on 1 June 1830. He was survived by his three daughters. His only son, James Murray Clapham, had died on HMS Pandora on 28 April 1809, aged 18.

== Works ==
=== Sermons ===
==== Individual sermons ====
- A sermon, preached in the parish church of Sunderland, for the benefit of the charity school, December 16, 1792. Leeds, n.d.
- A sermon, preached at Knaresborough, for the benefit of the Sunday schools. Leeds, n.d.
- A sermon, preached at the visitation, holden at Skipton, May 12, 1794. [Leeds, 1794].
- A sermon, preached at Knaresborough, before the Royal Knaresborough Volunteer Company: on Sunday, October 12, 1794. Leeds, n.d.
- How far Methodism conduces to the interests of Christianity, and the welfare of society: impartially considered, in a sermon, preached at the visitation, of the Right Reverend . . . William, Lord Bishop of Chester; holden at Boroughbridge, in Yorkshire, September 2, 1794. Leeds, n.d.
- A sermon, preached at Stockton-upon-Tees, on Wednesday, February 25, 1795, being the day appointed for a general fast. Binns, Leeds, 1795.
- A sermon, preached at Knaresborough, October 23d, 1796: on occasion of a form of thanksgiving being read for the late abundant harvest. Leeds, n.d.
- A sermon, preached at Great Ouseborne, on Tuesday, the 19th of December, 1797: being the day appointed by His Majesty for a general thanksgiving, to almighty God, for our naval victories. Leeds, n.d.
- A sermon preached at the visitation, holden at Boroughbridge, in Yorkshire, on Tuesday, June 26, 1798. Leeds, n.d.
- A sermon, preached at St. John's, Wakefield, for the benefit of the choir of the said church, December 16, 1798. Published at the request of the congregation. Leeds, n.d.
- The Sinfulness of Withholding Corn: A sermon preached at Great Ouseborne, on Sunday, March 16, 1800. [London, 1800].
- A sermon preached at Knaresborough, August 16, 1801, for the benefit of the Sunday Schools. London, 1801.
- An Earnest Exhortation to attend Public Worship ... addressed by a Minister to his Parishoners. London, 1804. Reprinted Baltimore, 1811.
- Friendly societies substitutes for parochial assessments: a sermon preached at Christ-Church, Hants, on whit-monday, June 11, 1810. London, 1810.
- A Sermon, preached at Christ Church, March 20, 1811, being a day appointed for a public fast, when a collection was made for the British prisoners in France. London, 1811.

==== Collected sermons ====
- Practical Sermons on Several Important Subjects. London, 1803. 2nd ed. (revised and corrected) 1804, 3rd ed. 1808, 4th ed. 1812. Second edition available on google books.

=== Compilations ===
- An Abridgement of the Lord Bishop of Lincoln's Elements of Christian Theology, for the Use of Families. Cambridge, 1802.
- Sermons, Selected and Abridged, Chiefly from Minor Authors, adapted to the Saints' Days, Festivals, Fasts, &c. and to General Occasions, &c. &c. For the Use of Families. London, 1803. 2nd ed., 1815, available on Google books.
- Forty Sermons, on Doctrinal and Practical Subjects: selected from the works of the Rev. Dr. S. Clarke. London, 1806.
- Prayers Collected from the Several Writings of Jeremy Tayor. London, 1810. Available on google books.
- The Pentateuch, or the Five Books of Moses Illustrated: being an explication of the phraseology incorporated with the text. London, 1818.
- A Collection of the Several Points of Sessions' Law. London, 1818.

== Sources ==
- Cooper, Thompson (1893). "Clapham, Samuel" . In Lee, Sidney (ed.). Dictionary of National Biography. Vol. 35. London: Smith, Elder & Co.
- Samuel Austin Allibone, A Critical Dictionary of English Literature, vol. 1 (1854), p. 384.
- Obituary in The Gentleman's Magazine 100 (1830), pp. 646–647.

Reprinted in Richard Vickerman Taylor, Biographia Leodiensis; or, Biographical Sketches of the Worthies of Leeds and Neighbourhood, London and Leeds, 1865, pp. 324-327. (available on google books)
