= List of converts to Judaism =

This article lists nations, groups, or tribes, as well as notable individuals, who have converted to Judaism. This article does not distinguish between Jewish religious movements, which hold different views on the legitimacy of one another's conversion methods. Converts are called gerei tzedek (Hebrew: גֵּרֵי צֶדֶק, romanized: gērê ṣedeq, lit. 'righteous foreigners'; sing. גֵּר צֶדֶק, gēr ṣedeq).

A number of prominent celebrities, such as Madonna, Demi Moore, and Ariana Grande, have become followers of a "New Age" version of Kabbalah (via, e.g., the Kabbalah Centre), derived from the body of Jewish mystical teachings known as Kabbalah, but do not consider themselves—and are not considered—Jewish by the normative Jewish community.

== Converted nations, groups or tribes ==
=== Converted nations, groups or tribes from non-Abrahamic religions ===
- Conversions throughout the Babylonian, Persian, Hellenistic, and Roman Empire periods (actual numbers and extent of proselytization disputed). Proselyte was initially used in reference to Hellenistic converts to Judaism.
- Idumeans (disputed), Edom, 2nd century BCE: conquered and converted by John Hyrcanus.
- Ituraeans (disputed), Lebanon and Syria, 2nd century BCE: according to Josephus, they were conquered and converted by Aristobulus I.
- Adiabene, northern Iraq, 1st century CE:
  - Helena of Adiabene, queen of Adiabene, from traditional Greek religion.
  - Izates bar Monobaz, king of Adiabene, from a Persian or Middle Eastern religion.
  - Symacho, wife of Izates bar Monobaz, from a Persian or Mideastern religion
  - Monobaz II, king of Adiabene, from a Persian or Middle Eastern religion.
- Khazars (disputed),), a semi-nomadic Turkic people from Central Asia (historical Khazaria), many of whom converted to Judaism en masse in the 8th and 9th centuries CE from a Khazar religion
  - Bulan, king of the Khazars, from a traditional Khazar religion
- Samaw'al ibn 'Adiya and his clan
- Himyarite Kingdom, Yemen, 6th century
  - Tub'a Abu Kariba As'ad, from Arabian religion, Himyarite king of Yemen; ruled Yemen 390–420 CE
  - Dhu Nuwas, king of Yemen, from a Mideastern religion
- Kingdom of Semien, Ethiopia, 4th century
- Multiple Berber tribes noted by Ibn Khaldun, including the Jarawa, and possibly the warrior queen Kahina and her tribe. Northwest Africa, 7th century, disputed
- Banu Qurayza and Banu Nadir: Arab tribes who converted to Judaism when Jews arrived in Hejaz following the Diaspora Revolt. Later, they claimed to be Israelites. They were of Arabian origins and believed in the concept of "sons of God" from pre-Islamic Arabia and indigenous polytheistic beliefs.

=== Converted nations, groups or tribes from Christianity ===
- Abayudaya
- Bnei Menashe
- Bene Ephraim, claim to be Jews who converted to Christianity, then converted back to Judaism
- B'nai Moshe (Inca Jews)
- Falash Mura
- Jews of San Nicandro
- Subbotniks

== Converted individuals ==
=== From Christianity ===
==== Former Christian clergy or theologians ====
- Robert de Reddinge (converted c. 1275)
- Abba Sabra, fifteenth-century Ethiopian Orthodox monk who joined the Beta Israel (Ethiopian Jewish) community. He converted his pupil, prince Abba Saga, to Judaism and introduced monasticism to Ethiopian Jewry.
- Nicolas Antoine, former Protestant theologian
- William G. Dever, a biblical archaeologist and former evangelical minister who became a Hebrew Bible scholar and converted to Reform Judaism, though he now identifies with secular humanism and irreligious nontheism.
- Géza Vermes, world-renowned historical Jesus research scholar, Hebraist and historian of religion, best known for being an eminent translator of the Dead Sea Scrolls; a former Roman Catholic priest of Jewish descent, he rediscovered his Jewish roots, abandoned Christianity and converted to Liberal Judaism.
- Ahuva Gray, former Protestant minister
- Asher Wade, former Methodist minister
- Ole Brunell, former Lutheran minister who converted with his family to Orthodox Judaism, moved to Israel and changed his name to Shlomo Brunell.

==== Other Christians who converted to Judaism ====
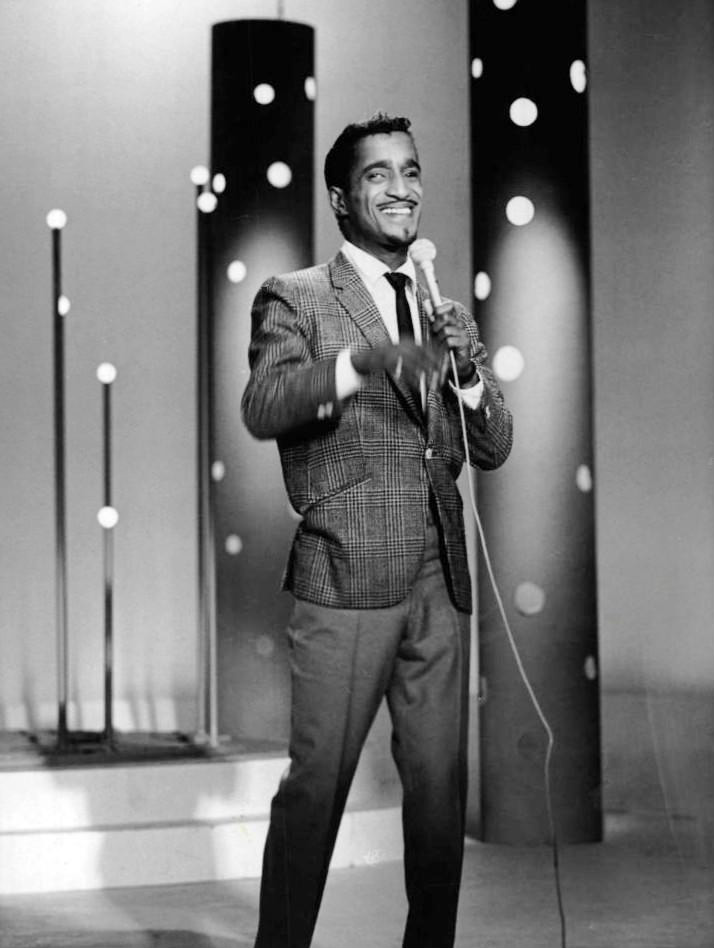
Sammy Davis Jr.

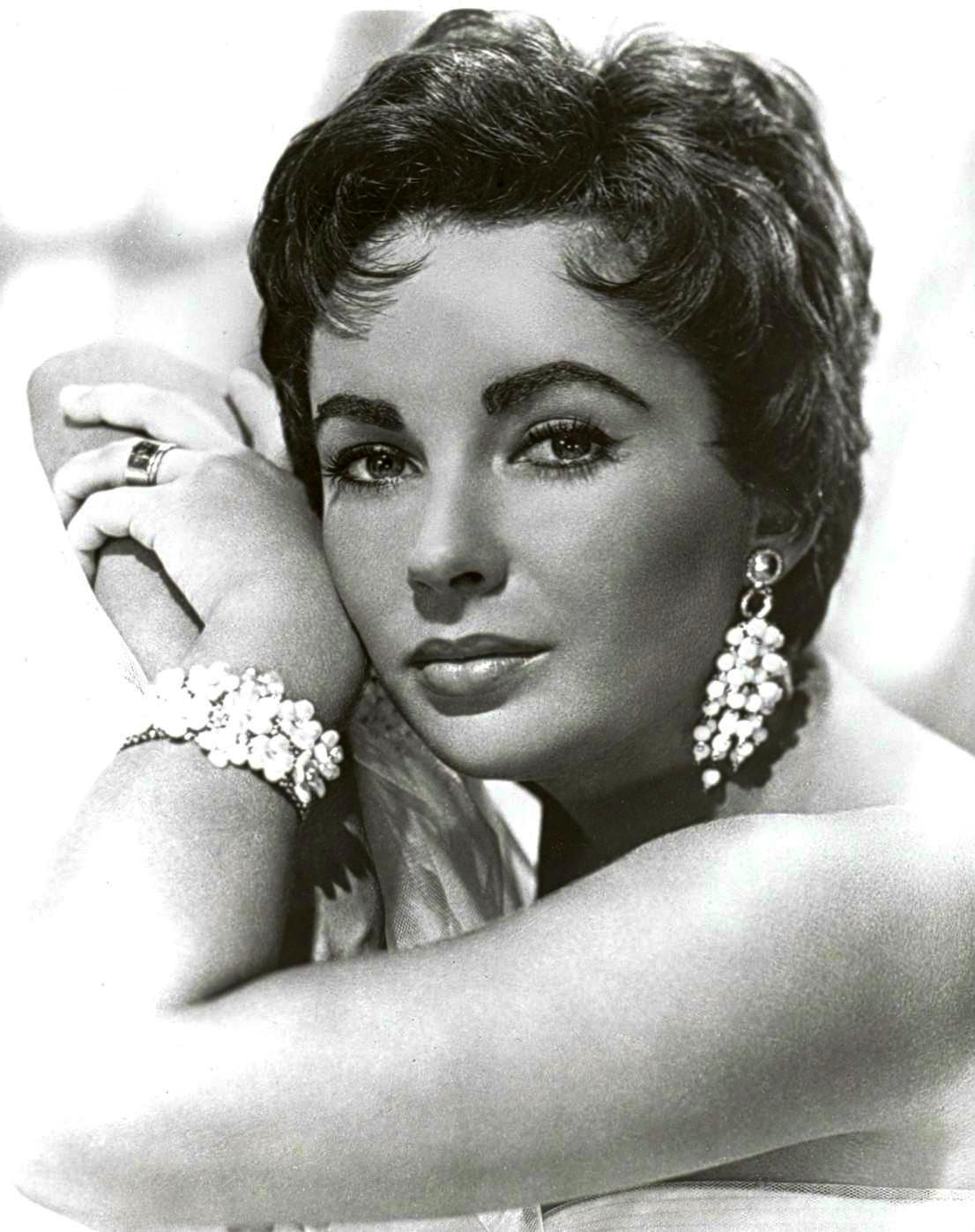
Elizabeth Taylor

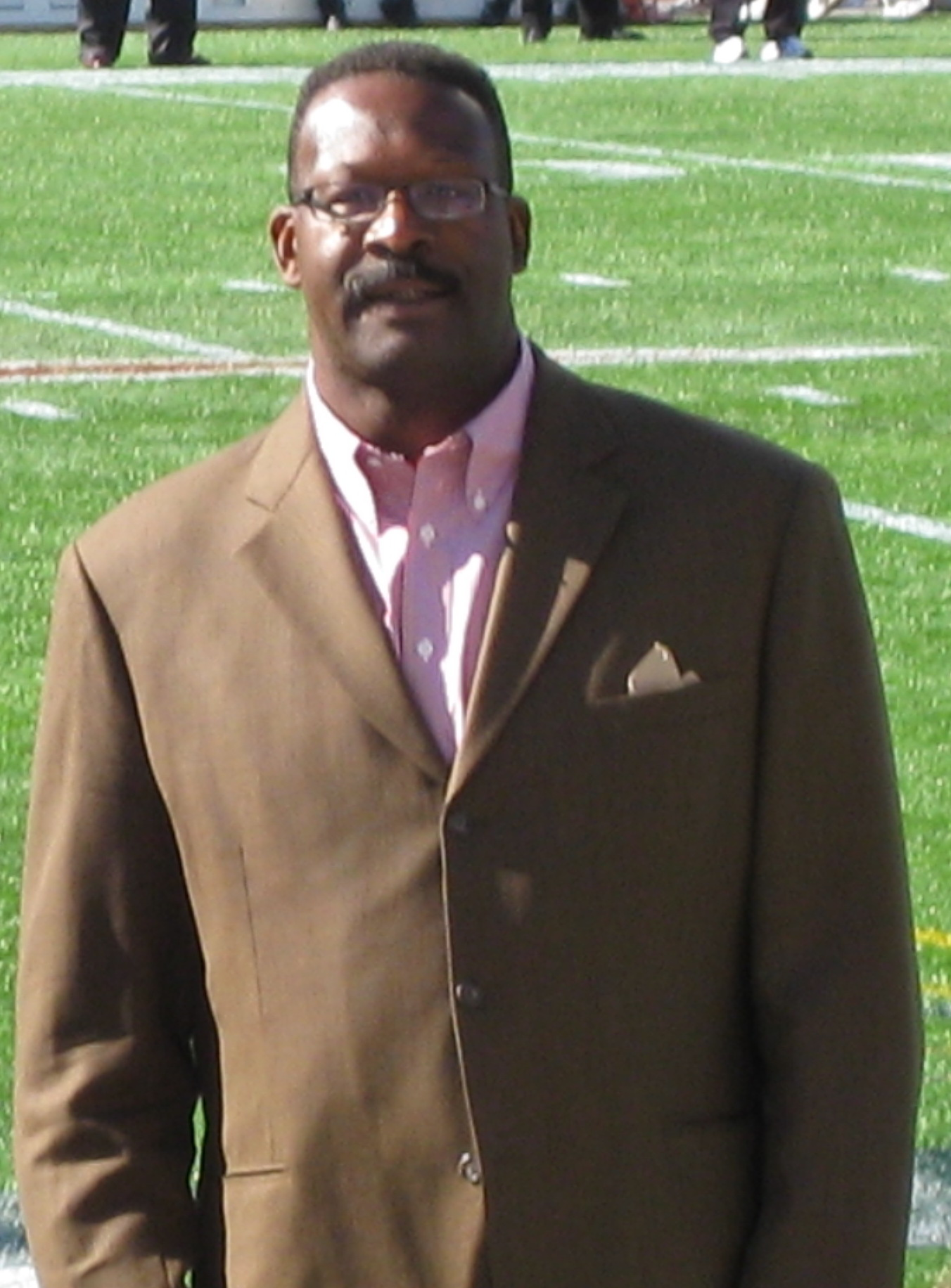
Andre Tippett

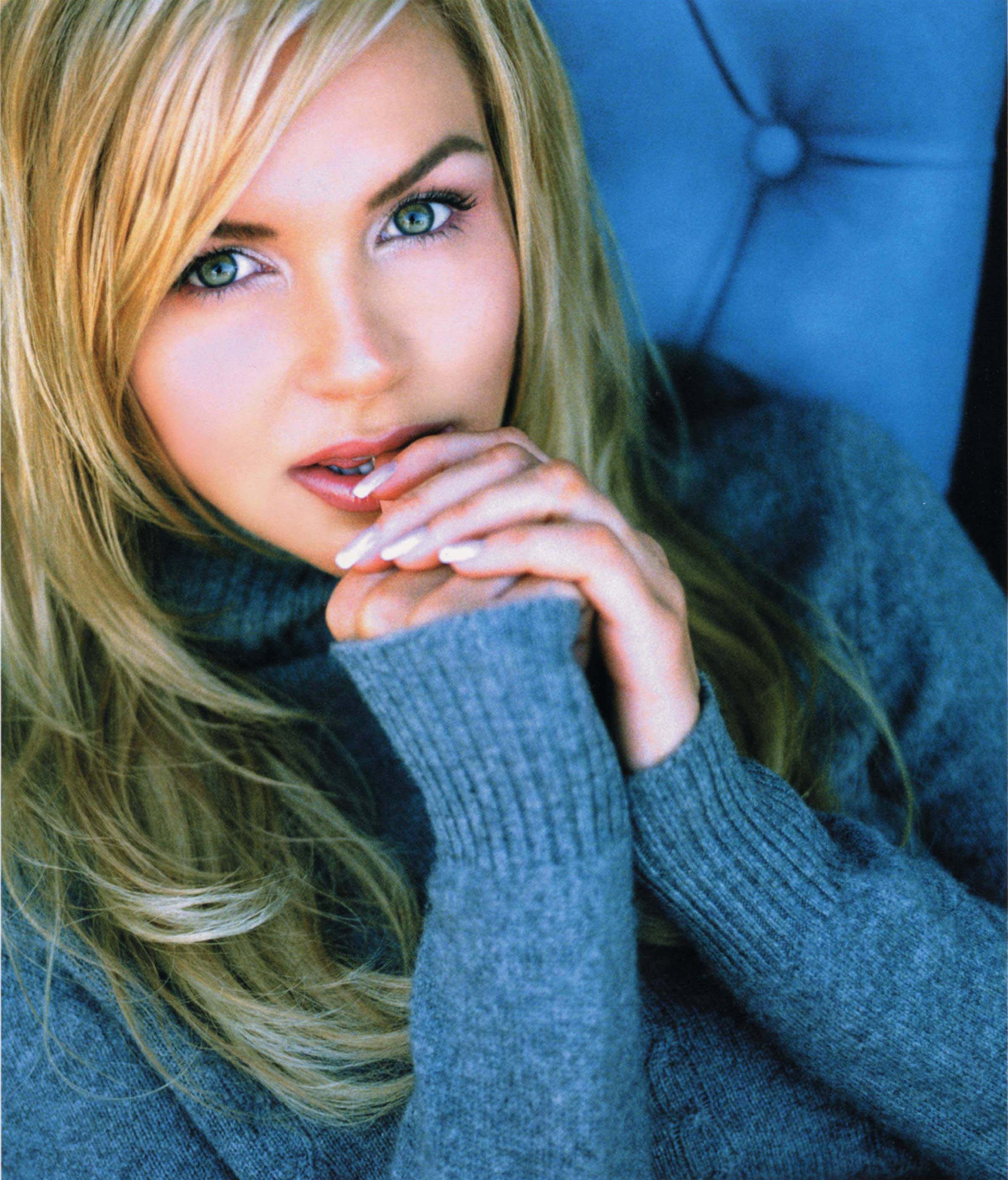
Nikki Ziering

- Abba Saga, Ethiopian prince and son of emperor Zara Yaqob, who persecuted Jews; converted with his teacher Abba Sabra, a former Ethiopian Orthodox monk
- Abraham ben Abraham, convert from the Potocki family, known as Ger Tzedek
- Abraham of Augsburg
- John Adler, American politician
- Aluizio Abranches, Brazilian filmmaker
- Anouk Aimée, French actress
- Amar'e Stoudemire, American and Israeli basketball player
- Aquila of Sinope, Bible translator
- Art Aragon, Mexican-American boxer
- Curtis Armstrong, American actor
- Tom Arnold, American actor
- Rafael Cansinos Assens, Spanish poet, essayist, literary critic and translator
- Moses ben Avraham Avinu
- Carroll Baker, American actress
- Anne Beatts, American comedy writer
- Antonia Bennett, American singer
- Polly Bergen, American actress and singer
- Nissim Black, rapper
- Darrell Blocker, "The Spy Whisperer," CIA agent, converted to conservative Judaism in 2017.
- Dany Boon, French comedian
- Elizabeth Brewster, Canadian poet
- May Britt, actress
- Geraldine Brooks, Pulitzer Prize-winning Australian-American journalist and author
- Campbell Brown, American television news reporter (Baptist Roman Catholic)
- Ken Burgess, British musician
- Anne Buydens, German-American producer, wife of Kirk Douglas
- Yisrael Campbell, comedian (lapsed Roman Catholic)
- Kate Capshaw, actress (ex-Methodist)
- Nell Carter, singer and actress
- Marvin Casey, Israeli-American hip hop dancer, choreographer, dance instructor and actor
- Mr. Catra, Brazilian funk singer and actor
- Elizabeth Jane Caulfield, linguist and musician
- Lauren Cohan, American actress
- Catherine Coulson, actress
- Warder Cresson, politician
- Jim Croce, singer-songwriter
- William Holmes Crosby Jr., physician, considered one of the founders of modern hematology
- Sammy Davis Jr., entertainer
- Bob Denard, a French 20th century mercenary
- Zooey Deschanel, actress, singer, entrepreneur
- Natalie Dessay, French soprano
- Jacqueline du Pré, cellist
- Stephen J. Dubner, American journalist, author, and podcast host
- Dubrovin Stanislav
- Patricia Duff, political activist and United States Democratic Party fundraiser
- Miss Elizabeth, also known as Elizabeth Ann Hulette, U.S. professional wrestling manager
- Hank Eng, Chinese-American politician
- Carlos Escudé, Argentine political scientist and author
- Rachel Factor, American Orthodox Jewish singer, actress, and dancer
- Nachman Fahrner, contemporary Jewish singer
- Louis Ferrante, American mobster
- Kate Fischer, Australian-American former model and actress
- Ada Fisher, American physician and political candidate
- Isla Fisher, model and actress (ex-Methodist)
- Mike Flanagan, Irish-Israeli soldier
- Luke Ford, journalist
- Maureen Forrester, Canadian opera singer
- Erin Foster, American writer, performer and entrepreneur
- Paula Fredriksen, former Catholic, historian of religion
- Aaron Freeman, journalist and comedian (lapsed Roman Catholic)
- Maja Ruth Frenkel, Croatian entrepreneur
- Capers Funnye (ex-Methodist), rabbi
- Steve Furness, American football player
- Natan Gamedze, former Protestant, linguist and a Swazi royal, now a black Haredi rabbi
- Scott Glenn, American actor
- Albert Goldsmid, British officer, founder of the Jewish Lads' Brigade and the Maccabaeans
- Lord George Gordon, nobleman and politician
- Reuben Greenberg, police chief of Charleston, South Carolina
- Lars Gustafsson, Swedish professor of philosophy at the University of Texas
- Daryl Hall, American musician
- Mary Hart (born 1950), American television personality, long-time host of the entertainment program Entertainment Tonight
- Morris Hatalsky, American professional golfer
- Anthony Heald, American actor
- Alma Hernandez, Democratic Member of the Arizona House of Representatives
- Henry Hill, American mobster
- Carolivia Herron, writer of children's and adult literature
- Monica Horan, actress
- Joel Horlen, American baseball player
- James Newton Howard, composer, conductor, and record producer
- Martha Hyer, actress
- Jenna Jameson, adult entertainer and entrepreneur
- Carolyn Jones, actress
- Thomas Jones (lapsed Roman Catholic)
- Y-Love a/k/a Yitz Jordan, musician
- Jon Juaristi, Spanish writer
- Skip Jutze, American major league baseball player
- Semei Kakungulu
- Walter Kaufmann, German-American philosopher, translator and poet
- Carol Kaye, American musician
- Felicity Kendal, British actress
- Cameron Kerry, politician, brother of John Kerry (lapsed Roman Catholic)
- Jamaica Kincaid, author
- John King, American television journalist (lapsed Roman Catholic)
- Karlie Kloss, model
- Fumiko Kometani, Japanese author and painter
- Mathilde Krim, Ph.D., founding Chairman of amfAR, association for AIDS research
- Anthony Lake, American diplomat, political figure, and academic
- Frida Laski, British suffragist, birth control advocate, and eugenicist
- Nahida Lazarus, German author, essayist, scholar, and literary critic
- Natasha Leggero, American actress and comedian
- John Lehr, American film and television actor and comedian
- Julius Lester, son of a Methodist minister and a children's author (ex-Methodist)
- Joan Lunden, American journalist, author and television host
- Ernst von Manstein, army officer and teacher
- Elliott Maddox, American former Major League Baseball player
- Richard Marceau, Canadian politician
- Sam McCullum (born 1952), NFL football wide receiver
- Charles McDew (1938–2018), African-American activist of the Civil Rights Movement.
- Anne Meara (1929–2015), American comedian and actress, partner and wife of Jerry Stiller (lapsed Roman Catholic)
- Adah Isaacs Menken, stage actress
- LaVon Mercer (born 1959), American-Israeli basketball player
- Anastassia Michaeli, Russian-born former member of the Israeli Knesset
- Benjamin Millepied, French dancer and choreographer
- Santa Montefiore, novelist
- Sara Jane Moore, American woman who attempted to assassinate U.S. president Gerald Ford in 1975
- Tommy Mottola, American record producer
- Françoise Mouly, French artist, designer, and art editor of The New Yorker
- Jeff Newman, American Major League Baseball catcher
- Bob Nystrom, Canadian former NHL player
- Arieh O'Sullivan, American-born Israeli journalist
- Morgan Ortagus, American television commentator, financial analyst, and political advisor
- Eleanor Parker, American actress
- Lorna Patterson, American film, stage and television actress
- Andrew Percy, British politician
- Alison Pick, Canadian novelist and poet
- Rebecca Pidgeon, Scottish-American actress, singer-songwriter
- Bob Plager, Canadian retired professional NHL ice hockey defenceman
- Moses Prado, professor of the classic languages at the University of Marburg
- Marge Redmond, actress
- Roger Rees, actor
- Reuel Abraham, German pilot in Hitler's army, then became a Jew and citizen of Israel
- Mandy Rice-Davies, British model and showgirl
- Sofia Richie. American model and media personality
- Mary Doria Russell, American author (lapsed Roman Catholic)
- Jackie Sandler, American actress
- Bärbel Schäfer, German television presenter and talk show host
- Mary Schaps, Israeli-American mathematical scholar
- Laura Schlessinger, American radio personality
- Norma Shearer, American actress
- Joseph J. Sherman, businessman
- Cate Shortland, Australian director
- Shyne, Belizean–American rapper
- Karol Sidon, Czech Orthodox rabbi, writer and playwright
- Daniel Silva, American author of thriller and espionage novels
- Chris Smith, American-Israeli basketball player
- Willie "the Lion" Smith, American pianist and composer
- Robin Spark, Scottish artist.
- June Squibb, American actress
- Kim Stanley, American actress
- Venetia Stanley, socialite
- Joseph Abraham Steblicki (lapsed Roman Catholic)
- Margo Stilley, American film actress
- Annette Taddeo, businesswoman and politician
- Elizabeth Taylor, actress (ex-Christian Scientist)
- Karen Tintori, American author of fiction and nonfiction (lapsed Roman Catholic)
- Andre Tippett, American Hall of Fame former football linebacker for the New England Patriots (ex-Baptist)
- Jacob Tirado (c. 1540–1620), co-founder of the Sephardic community of Amsterdam
- Ivanka Trump, businesswoman, raised Presbyterian
- Bob Tufts (1955–2019), American former Major League Baseball pitcher
- Ike Turner, American musician, bandleader, talent scout, and record producer; son of a Baptist minister
- Jeff Tweedy, American musician
- Michael W. Twitty, American writer, culinary historian and educator
- Alex Tyus, American-Israeli professional basketball player
- Chris Van Allsburg, children's writer
- Conrad Veidt, German actor
- Jackie Wilson, American soul singer
- Mare Winningham, actress, singer (lapsed Roman Catholic)
- Katarzyna Weiglowa, Polish martyr
- Steve Yeager, American baseball player
- Nikki Ziering, model

=== From atheism and/or agnosticism ===
- Christian B. Anfinsen – Nobel prize-winning chemist (Orthodox Judaism)
- David P. Goldman, "Spengler" – columnist and former member of the LaRouche movement who embraced Judaism in the 1990s
- Will Herberg – social philosopher and sociologist of religion; Jewish theologian; former atheist and Marxist of Jewish ancestry who was raised atheist
- Benny Lévy – philosopher; last personal secretary of Jean-Paul Sartre
- Suzy Menkes – fashion journalist
- Hilary Putnam – philosopher raised in a Jewish-atheist home
- Mary Doria Russell
- Anna Silk – Canadian actress
- David Wolpe – a leading rabbi in Conservative Judaism; former atheist

=== From other Abrahamic religions ===
==== From Islam ====
- Avraham Sinai – Lebanese member of Hezbollah who had an Orthodox conversion and lives as a Haredi Jew in Tsfat.
- Baruch Mizrahi – Palestinian Arab and member of the Irgun.
- Dario Hunter – American lawyer, rabbi and politician.
- Ibrahim Shaheen and Inshirah Moussa – Palestinian man and his Egyptian wife.
- Nasreen Qadri – Arab Israeli singer.
- Nissim Baruch Black (born Damian Jamohl Black) – American rapper and music producer, raised Muslim but converted to Christianity before converting to Judaism.
- Khadija Patman – British pornographic actress of South Asian origin. She converted to Judaism while dating her Jewish boyfriend.

==== From Samaritanism ====
- Sofi Tsedaka, Israeli actress, singer, television presenter and politician

=== From other non-Abrahamic religions ===
==== From Shinto ====
- Setsuzo Kotsuji, son of a Shinto priest, and a professor in Japan (converted from Shinto to Christianity and then from Christianity to Judaism)

==== From Buddhism ====
- Angela Warnick Buchdahl, American Reform Jewish Rabbi, converted to Reform Judaism at age 21. She was not raised within the Buddhist faith; however, her mother is Buddhist so by Orthodox Jewish law she was not considered Jewish, but she was raised Jewish and so by Reform Jewish law she has always been Jewish.

==== From Black Hebrew Israelitism ====
- Eddie Butler – Israeli singer, converted to Orthodox Judaism
- Capers Funnye

==== From Greco-Roman religion ====
- Aquila of Sinope (Acylas), from traditional Greek religion
- Paulina Beturia, from traditional Roman religion
- Flavia Domitilla, from traditional ancient Roman religion (possibly to Jewish Christianity, as she is also a Christian saint)
- Titus Flavius Clemens, consul, great-nephew of the Roman Emperor Vespasian, from traditional Roman religion (possibly to Jewish Christianity, as he is also a Christian saint)
- Fulvia, wife of Emperor Tiberius' close friend, Saturninus, from traditional Roman religion
- Helena, queen of Adiabene, from traditional Greek religion.
- Onkelos, Hebrew scholar and translator, from ancient Roman religion

==== From other traditional Pagan religions and faiths ====
- Bithiah, from traditional Egyptian religion.
- Bulan, king of the Khazars, from traditional Khazar religion
- Dhu Nuwas, king of Yemen, from a Mideastern religion
- Obadiah the prophet, from a Mideastern religion
- Sh'maya, Sage and President of the Sanhedrin, apparently from a Mideastern religion
- Avtalyon, Sage and Vice-President of the Sanhedrin, apparently from a Mideastern religion
- Izates bar Monobaz, king of Adiabene, from a Persian or Mideastern religion.
- Symacho, wife of Izates bar Monobaz, from a Persian or Mideastern religion.
- Monobaz II, king of Adiabene, from a Persian or Mideastern religion.
- Tub'a Abu Kariba As'ad, from Arabian religion, was the Himyarite king of Yemen. He ruled Yemen from 390 to 420 CE.

==== List of conversions named in the Old Testament ====
- Bithiah, from traditional Egyptian religion
- Darius the Mede, from a mideastern religion who admitted that "God of Israel is eternal Forever"
- Jethro, priest of Midian and father-in-law of Moses, from a Mideastern religion
- Makeda, queen of Sheba, from a Mideastern or Ethiopian religion
- Osenath, from the ancient Egyptian religion (her name relates to Anat)
- Ruth, great-grandmother of King David, from a Near Eastern religion
- Yael, from Canaanite or another Near Eastern religion
- Zipporah, from a Mideastern or northern African religion

=== Undetermined former religion ===
- According to rabbinic tradition, Obadiah the prophet, from a Mideastern religion
- Drew Bundini Brown, assistant trainer of former heavyweight boxing champion Muhammad Ali
- Sarah Brown, actress
- Salem Shaloam David
- József Eisenhoffer
- Nachman Fahrner
- Lenny Kuhr, Dutch singer-songwriter
- Martha Nussbaum, American philosopher and academic
- Annamie Paul, Canadian activist, lawyer, and former leader of the Green Party of Canada.
- Helen Reddy, Australian American singer and actress
- Dara Torres
- Schlomo Hofmeister
- Desmond Wilcox
- Andre Williams

=== Converts who later left the faith ===
- Cristian Castro, Grammy Award-nominated Mexican pop singer (reverted to Roman Catholicism after divorcing his Jewish wife)
- Bob Denard, French soldier and mercenary. Converted from Catholicism to Judaism, then from Judaism to Islam, then from Islam to Catholicism
- Polemon II, king of Cilicia, converted to marry the Jewish princess Berenice; later relapsed

== See also ==
- List of people by belief
- List of Jews
- List of converts to Buddhism
- List of converts to Christianity
- List of people who converted to Catholicism
- List of converts to Hinduism
- List of converts to Islam
- List of converts to Sikhism

== Bibliography ==
- Hill, Andrew E. (2009). "Daniel-Malachi". In Longman, Tremper; Garland, David E. (eds.). The Expositor's Bible Commentary. Vol. 8. Zondervan. ISBN 9780310590545.
- Seow, C.L. (2003). Daniel. Westminster John Knox Press. ISBN 9780664256753.
