= Matthew Kalman =

Matthew Kalman is the co-author, with Matt Rees, of The Murder of Yasser Arafat, published in January 2013.

Kalman has been a foreign correspondent based in Jerusalem since 1998 reporting for Times of Israel and Haaretz. He has also reported for American publications including the Chronicle of Higher Education, MIT Technology Review, the Boston Globe, Time, Newsweek, San Francisco Chronicle, New York Daily News and USA Today. In addition, he has reported for the British Daily Mail, London Sunday Times, and the Canadian The Globe and Mail.

He is currently working with the London-based The Independent.

Kalman was appointed editor in chief of The Jerusalem Report in January 2012. and held the position until August 2012, resigning when asked to "implement a 10 per cent budget cut demanded by the management." Kalman said "I would rather resign than try to produce the magazine on even more of a shoestring than we currently have."

Kalman has also reported for and is a television contributor for PBS in the United States, and Channel 4 News, UK, and CTV in Canada.

He is a commentator for BBC Radio in Britain, and other radio programs in Canada as well.

Kalman was the only reporter present throughout the 7-year James Ossuary trial in Jerusalem of Oded Golan, accused of faking the ossuary, or burial box, of James, the brother of Jesus. He thoroughly chronicled the events online.

In 1999, then-Hamas leader Sheikh Ahmed Yassin made a peace offer to the incoming Israeli government of Ehud Barak during an interview with Kalman.

In 2008, he co-directed and co-produced, with David Blumenfeld, the documentary Circumcise Me: The Comedy of Yisrael Campbell, which has been screened at more than 50 film festivals in the US, UK, Canada, Australia and on TV in the US and Israel.

He graduated Cambridge University with an MA in History. In 1983/84, he had been chairman of the Union of Jewish Students.
