= Reval Governorate =

1719–1783 unit of Russia

Reval Governorate Ревельская губерния
- Governorate of the Russian Empire
- 1719–1783
- Capital: Reval
- Population
- 135,000
- History
  - Established: 29 May 1719
  - Disestablished: 3 July 1783
Preceded by	Succeeded by
Duchy of Estonia (1561–1721)	Reval Viceroyalty

Reval Governorate (Russian: Ревельская губерния, romanized: Revel'skaya guberniya) was an administrative-territorial unit (guberniya) and one of the Baltic governorates of the Russian Empire, which existed from 1719 to 1783. Its capital was in Reval (Tallinn).

== History ==
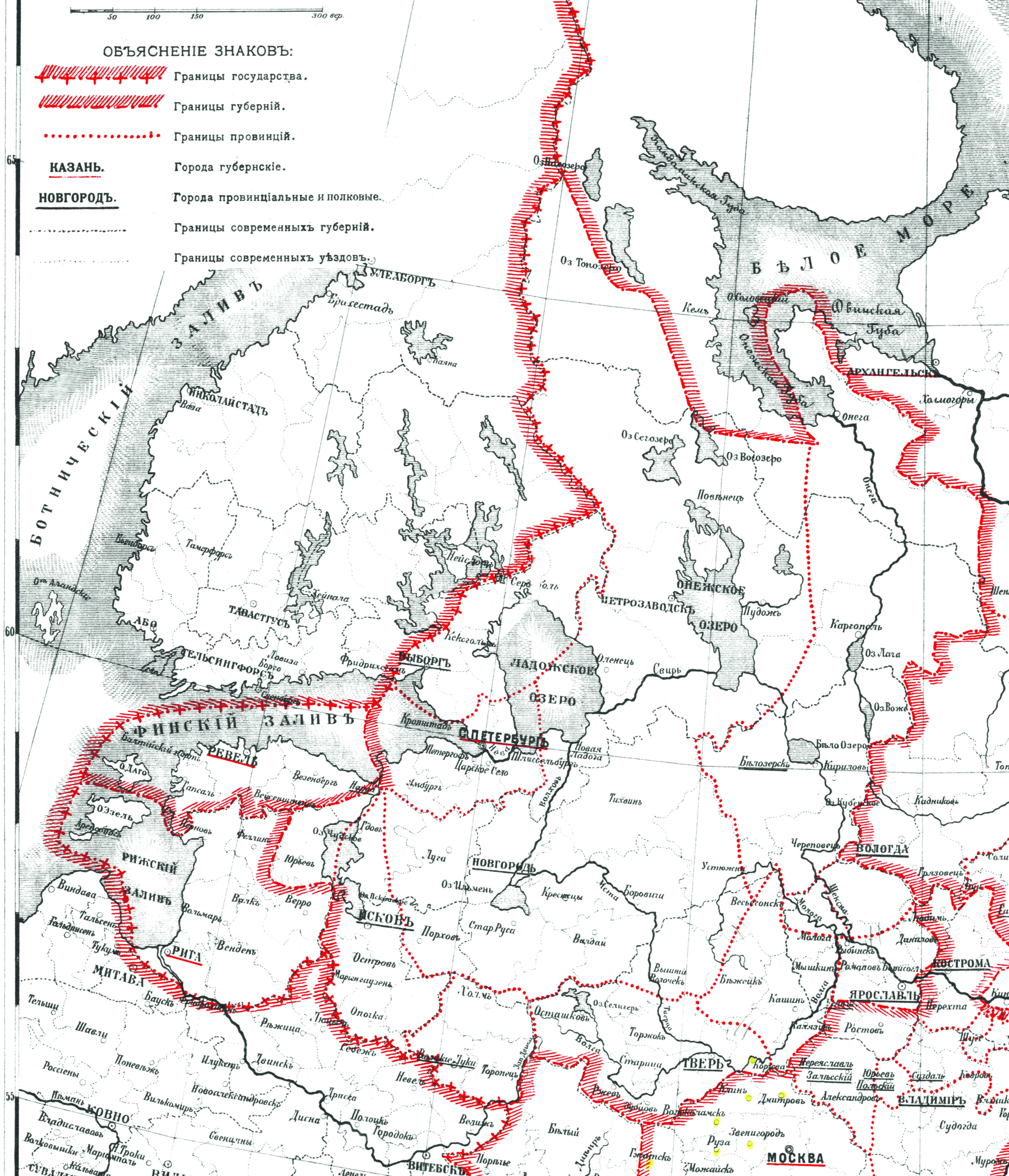
Map showing the Reval Governate, Riga Governate and Province of St Petersburg in 1720-1727

Reval Governorate was originally formed in 1719 by Tsar Peter the Great of Russia, under a decree issued on 29 May 1719. It encompassed four North-Estonian counties: Läänemaa, Harjumaa, Järvamaa, and Virumaa. At that time, the Narva region was merged with Saint Petersburg Governorate.

These territories were conquered from Sweden during the Great Northern War by Russian troops, with Vyborg falling on 24 June 1710, Riga on 15 July, Pärnu on 23 August, followed by Paide, Haapsalu, Kuressaare on 26 September, and Tallinn on 10 October.

Earlier in the Great Northern War, in 1708, the Russian troops had already taken control of Virumaa (then known as Narva Uyezd) and Tartumaa (then known as Tartu Uyezd), which were incorporated into Saint Petersburg Governorate.

Sweden formally ceded the Estonian territories captured during the 1710 war in the Treaty of Nystad in 1721. Despite the change in sovereignty, the Swedish system of administration and government persisted in Estonia. This continuity was guaranteed by the acts of capitulation signed by the Estonian towns and knighthood when they surrendered to the Russian troops during the Great Northern War.

From 1713 to 1722, Tartu Uyezd was part of Reval Governorate, but it was reincorporated into Riga Governorate in 1722.

In 1727, Narva Uyezd was detached from Saint Petersburg Governorate. However, the towns of Narva and Ivangorod remained within the Saint Petersburg Governorate, serving as the capital of Jamburg County from 1775 to 1802. The eastern border of Reval Governorate (Narva Uyezd) began at Joala Manor and extended to the mouth of the Narva River, but further border demarcation efforts ceased in 1784.

In 1783, the Reval Viceroyalty was established from Reval Governorate. Subsequently, in 1796, in conjunction with Narva Uyezd, which had been separated from Saint Petersburg Governorate, Estonia Governorate was formed.

== Administrative divisions ==
In 1719, the Russian Empire implemented an administrative reform, reorganizing its territories into governorates, provinces, and districts. Due to its relatively small size, Reval Governorate was not subdivided into provinces; instead, it was divided directly into districts. The administrative division in 1719 was as follows:

Harju district (Гарриенский уезд), which included the parishes of Kuusalu, Jõelähtme, Harju-Jaani, Jüri, Juuru, Kose, Rapla, Hageri, Nissi, Keila, Madise and Risti. Virumaa distrikt (Вирляндский уезд) comprising the parishes of Jõhvi, Vaivara, Lüganuse, Viru-Nigula, Rakvere, Haljala, Kadrina, Jaagupi, Väike-Maarja and Simuna Järva distrikt (Эрвенский дистрикт) comprising the parishes of Ambla, Jaani, Madise, Koeru, Peetri, Anna and Türi Haapsalu district (Викский уезд), comprising Märjamaa, Vigala, Kullamaa, Martna, Kirbla, Lääne-Nigula, Ridala, Lihula, Karuse, Hanila, Mihkli, Haapsalu parishes and islands.

== Governors ==
- 1710–1711 Rudolph Felix Bauer – General-Governor
- 1711–1719 Prince Aleksandr Danilovich Menshikov – General-Governor
- 1719–1728 Count Fyodor Matveyevich Apraksin – General-Governor
- 1728–1736 Friedrich Baron von Löwen
- 1736–1738 Sebastian Ernst von Manstein
- 1738–1740 Gustaf Otto Douglas
- 1740–1743 Woldemar von Löwendahl
- 1743–1753 Peter August Friedrich von Holstein-Beck (1696–1775)
- 1753–1758 Prince Vladimir Petrovich Dolgorukiy
- 1758–1775 Peter August Friedrich von Holstein-Beck – General-Governor
- 1775–1792 Count George Browne – General-Governor
- 1783–1786 Georg Friedrich von Grotenhielm
- 1786–1797 Heinrich Johann Baron von Wrangell

== See also ==
- Baltic governorates
