= Israeli–Palestinian Comedy Tour =

Israeli–Palestinian Comedy Tour was founded in November 2006 by Palestinian comedian and columnist Ray Hanania and Israeli comedian and online Podcaster Charley Warady. Arab-American Palestinian comedian and award-winning journalist Ray Hanania and his companions from the Israeli–Palestinian Comedy Tour operate under the slogan: "If we can laugh together, we can live together".

Warady and Hanania grew up in the same Chicago neighborhood, Pill Hill/South Shore Valley in the 1960s. Warady discovered Hanania while exploring the internet for references to Pill Hill and found Hanania's online book "Midnight Flight: The Story of White Flight in Chicagoland" (2000, Online, www.hanania.com). When Warady contacted Hanania and identified himself as an Israeli comedian, Hanania challenged Warady to appear on the same comedy stage with a Palestinian comedian to challenge the animosity enveloping both their peoples. Warady and Hanania arranged the first-ever Palestinian-Israeli comedy tour in the world, with four shows in Israel and one show in East Jerusalem in January 2007. The shows were internationally acclaimed and the duo organized a second tour of Israel and the Palestinian territories in June 2007. The comedians are joined by Aaron Freeman, a veteran of Second City in Chicago and an African American convert to Judaism, and by Yisrael Campbell, a Hasidic Jewish convert from Catholicism.

== The tour ==
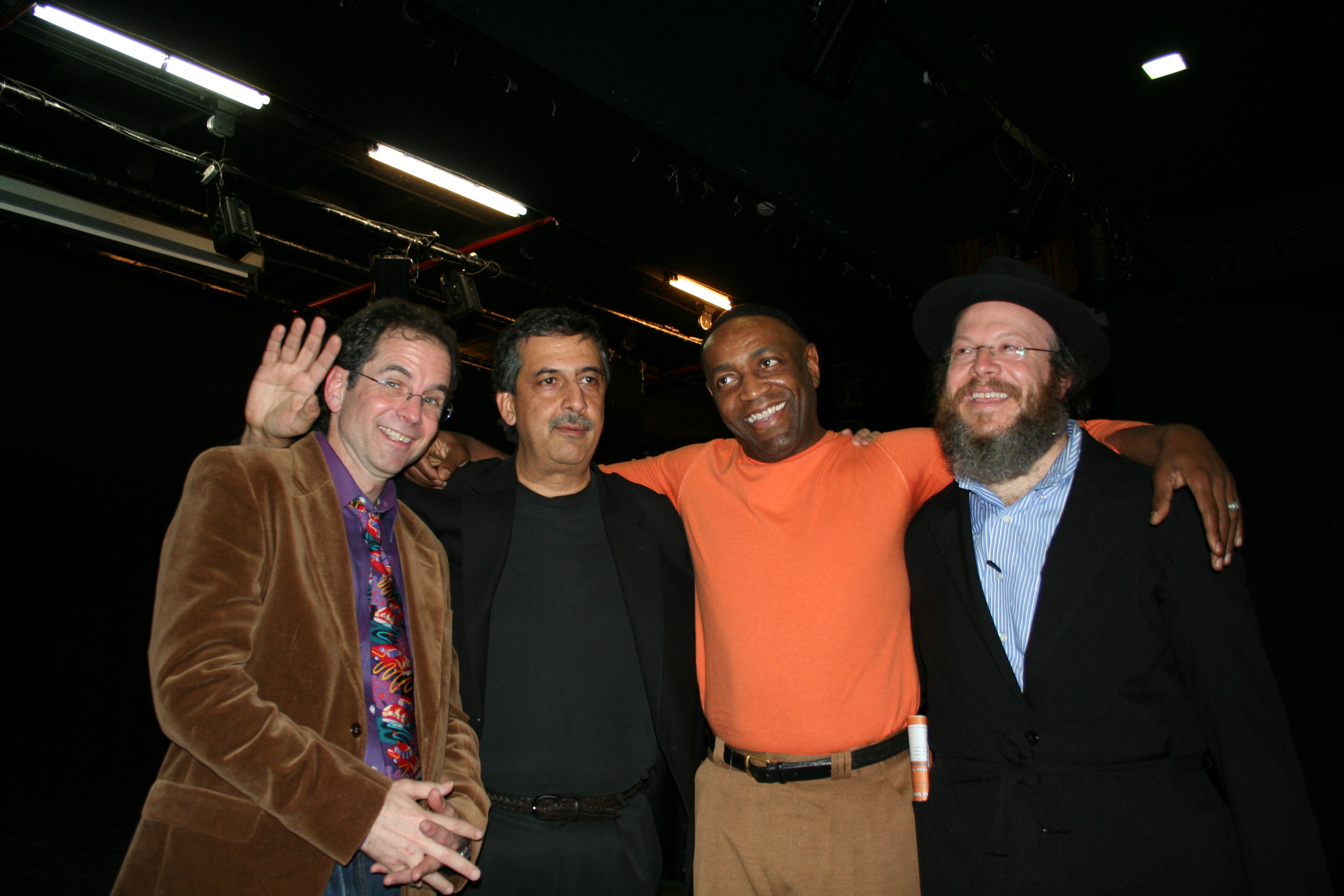
The members of Israeli–Palestinian Comedy Tour Charley Warady (American born Jew, migrated to Israel), Ray Hanania (American born Palestinian), Aaron Freeman (African-American born Catholic, converted to Judaism), Yisrael Campbell (American born Catholic, converted to Judaism and migrated to Israel).

Israeli–Palestinian Comedy Tour is the show of an American-Palestinian Ray Hanania and three Jewish comedians Charley Warady, Aaron Freeman and Yisrael Campbell, two of whom live in Israel.

The MidEastWeb Directory of Middle East Israel-Palestine Information Resources provides links to such shows. It says about "Israeli–Palestinian Comedy Tour": [it is] "To make you laugh. To make you think. To help end conflict in the middle east." It further describes "Stand Up For Peace" as "Scott Blakeman and Dean Obeidallah founded and produce Stand up For Peace, which presents Jewish and Arab-American comedians standing together for a non-violent, political solution to the Middle East crisis." "The American Muslim" journal ("TAM") mentions both shows as "general good news" "for Muslims in 2007"

The comedians perform around the world. The stage name of the group (officially Israeli–Palestinian Comedy Tour) changes depending on the place the show is given. While in West Bank they are known as "Ray Hanania And Three Hostages", in Gaza they made it simpler - "The Four Hostages". When they give shows in United States of America, they are "Three Jews And An Arab", and in Israel they are back to their official name. All of them support the Two-state solution, but their opinions on the controversial issues about the status of East Jerusalem and other issues alike are not clearly expressed.

All their performances are filled with sparkling jokes, satire and humor about Middle East conflict that many believe is not a laughing matter. Comedians disagree. They believe that the laughter could lead to a better understanding between the opposite sides of the conflict.

Some of their jokes are prepared before the show while others are just improvisations as the show progresses. Once at the beginning of the show given in one of the Chicago synagogues with mostly Jewish audience Hanania asked innocently: "How many Arabs are here tonight?" He held a pause during which the silent spectators looked puzzled ... and then exclaimed: "Great security!" And the laughing erupted.

No joke is off-limits no matter how politically incorrect it might be. Waraday starts on 72 virgins in connection to suicide bombings. He asks what 57-year-old menopausal grandmother who blew herself up not so long ago hoped to get in the Arab paradise:

What would they possibly have told this woman — that she'll have 72 kids who'll call every day and visit once in a while? I know my Mom would blow herself up for that.

Hanania together with his companion reasons:

I'm an Arab, so we read from right to left. There's only one virgin, she's 72 years old, and they promise her to everybody. That ain't paradise."

While performing in Syndrome Theater in Jerusalem Hanania shared the story about his wedding ceremony with his Jewish bride:

We had 900 people, we only sent out 24 invitations ... We had all the Arabs on one side, all the Jews on the other side. We didn't have a bridal party. We had a U.N. Peacekeeping Force right down the middle, on the Arab side of course".

When asked how he became involved with three Jewish comedians and Jewish humor Hanania jokingly responded: "These guys stole our land, our homes, so I read a couple of books on Jewish humor, and I stole their jokes."

Comparing Israeli check points to toll plazas Charley Warady describes his experience with those:

The first time I drove through a checkpoint I just threw some change at them out the window and drove through... . until they shot at me. I didn't know they'd shoot at me for not giving exact change.

Explaining how voters in Gaza ended up electing Hamas he says:

Arabic is very hard to read ... instead of Hamas and Fatah, Palestinian's thought they were voting for Hummus or Pita. And hey, anyone can make a good Pita, but a good Hummus is hard to make.

Aaron Freeman jokes that "in the Comedy Tour all the Jews get along with "Ray", but they all fight with each other."

=== Israeli Palestinian Comedians re-launch ===
Ray Hanania, Aaron Freeman Yisrael Campbell and Charley Warady revived the early comedy effort to bring everyone together with a new coalition of Palestinians and Muslims who are willing to work not just with Jews, but also Israelis, and Israelis who are willing to work not just with Muslims and Arabs but with Palestinians, the most difficult hurdle to overcome. The new coalition includes many more comedians including Ray's Jewish son, Aaron Hanania, and Palestinian Muslim Mona Aburmishan, Muslim Pakistani Arif Choudhury, Israeli Benji Lovett, and Jewish comic Larry Bloom.

The Israeli Palestinian Comedy troupe is the most mixed Arab-Jewish, Palestinian-Israeli, Muslim, Christian and Jewish group performing. Their motto remains "If we can laugh together, we can live together."

The new website is http://www.IsraeliPalestinianComedy.com

== Other Arab-Israeli comedy performances ==
=== Stand Up For Peace ===
Stand Up For Peace is the name of the show performed by two men: a Jew Scott Blakeman and an Arab Dean Obeidallah. The men perform separately talking about everything from Patriot act to terrorism and September 11 attacks. They like performing in front of students. After performance they take questions together.

=== Nabil and Hisham ===
During the 1990s, following the conclusion of the Oslo agreement and the Israeli-Jordanian Peace Treaty, two Jordanian artists - Nabil Sawalha and Hisham Yanes - established the duo Nabil and Hisham, which performed in Israel, the Palestinian Authority and Jordan.
