= Manstein =

Manstein is a German surname. Notable people with this surname include:

- Albrecht Gustav von Manstein (1805–1877), Prussian general
- Erich von Manstein (1887–1973), German commander of the Wehrmacht, grandson of Albrecht, and field marshal from 1942
- Ernst Sebastian von Manstein (1678–1747), Baltic German soldier and statesman
- Ernst von Manstein (1869–1944), Prussian army officer and prominent convert to Judaism
- Tim Manstein (born 1989), German footballer
