= Circumcise Me =

- Directed by: David Blumenfeld and Matthew Kalman
- Produced by: David Blumenfeld and Matthew Kalman
- Starring: Yisrael Campbell
- Music by: Hadag Nachash
- Distributed by: Alden Films
- Release date: 2008
- Running time: 43 min
- Language: English

Circumcise Me is a 2008 biographical film about the American-born Israeli comedian Yisrael Campbell. It was produced by Matthew Kalman, foreign news correspondent in Jerusalem for USA Today, Canada's Globe & Mail and other newspapers, and David Blumenfeld, an Israel-based photographer who has photographed for Time, Newsweek and other publications.

The film, originally screened under the title It's Not in Heaven: The Comedy of Yisrael Campbell, is about a Catholic convert to Judaism who has become a stand-up comedy star in Israel. Campbell's routine riffs on the fact that he converted to Judaism three times, once Reform, once Conservative and once Orthodox. The film has been screened in Toronto and Jerusalem, and was released in the United States by Alden Films in 2008.

== Reception ==
The Economist called the film "hilarious and moving". Academic Maureen Puffer-Rothenberg recommended it for Jewish studies programs, observing that it demonstrated the coexistence of religious traditions and modern sensibilities.
