= Abraham of Augsburg =

German proselyte to Judaism

Abraham of Augsburg (died 21 November 1265) was a German proselyte to Judaism. He died a martyr's death.

== Life ==
Abraham was born at Augsburg, and he later converted into Judaism at a foreign region.

He adopted his new faith with such enthusiasm that, returning to Augsburg, he publicly assailed Christianity and attacked images of the saints, namely severing the heads of some crucifix figurines, and also smashing a religious portrait which had been engraved on stone. For all this he was sentenced to torture and death by burning.

Reportedly, Abraham's rage ensued in a bitter confrontation between the Jews and Catholics of Sinzig, ensuing in a regional pogrom in which 61 other Jews were slain, together with Abraham. The incident attracted considerable attention, and it forms the subject of elegies by Mordecai ben Hillel (who himself suffered martyrdom in 1298) and by the liturgical poet Moses ben Jacob. The rites of Selichot tell about Abraham.

== Bibliography of Jewish Encyclopedia ==
- Leopold Zunz, S.P. pp. 350, 364;
- S. Kohn, Mordecai ben Hillel, pp. 46–49 and appendix I;
- Perles, in Monatsschrift, 1873, pp. 513, 514;
- Salfeld, Martyrologium des Nürnberger Memorbuches, pp. 22, 149, 150;
