= Nicolas Antoine =

Nicolas Antoine (c.1602 – April 20, 1632) was a French Protestant theologian and pastor who attempted to convert to Judaism, although he was never officially admitted to Judaism, due to fears by the Jewish community that persecutions would happen if it became known that he was an apostate of Christianity. He was advised instead to live the life of a crypto-Jew. He suffered martyrdom by being burned at the stake in Geneva on April 20, 1632.

== Early life ==
Nicolas Antoine was born of Catholic parents in 1602 or 1603 at Briey, a small town of Lorraine. Among his ancestors were a Jewish family who had converted to Christianity. For five years he attended the college at Luxemburg, and was then sent to Pont-à-Mousson, Treves, and Cologne for higher instruction under the Jesuits. They seemed to have little influence over him, as by the time he returned to Briey, at the age of twenty, he was no longer an ardent Catholic.

The doctrines of Protestantism attracted him, and he allowed himself to be converted by the fervent eloquence of Paul Ferry, a preacher of reputation, and pastor of the Reformed Church in Metz. The young convert then attended the academies of Sedan and Geneva in order to study the Reformed faith, but the deeper he delved into the study of Protestantism the less fervent became his enthusiasm; and he very soon arrived at the most unexpected conclusion; namely, that the Old Testament alone contained the truth.

== Crypto-Judaism ==
The rabbinate of Metz refused to receive the young man into Judaism, offering as an excuse the fear of reprisals on the part of the authorities, and Antoine was advised to go to the Netherlands or to Italy, where Jews enjoyed more liberty. Accompanied by a Christian clergyman whom he had known in Sedan, and whom he attempted to convert to Judaism on the way, he traveled to Venice. There he found that the prevailing conditions had been too favorably depicted. The Jews were tolerated by the Venetian Republic merely for commercial reasons; they lived in the Venetian Ghetto and were obliged to wear a yellow disk. The Venetian Jews could offer Antoine no more encouragement than their brethren of Metz. At Padua he met with a similar check. According to the documents produced at his trial, the Italian Jews gave him the "diabolical advice" to pursue the life of a pious Jew under the cloak of the Church. Antoine proceeded to Geneva, where he accepted a position as tutor in the family of the pastor and professor Diodati. For some time he also taught the upper class of the college, but, being an apostate from Catholicism, he was not considered sufficiently orthodox to be entrusted with the chair of philosophy at the Academy of Geneva.

== Protestant pastor ==
Antoine, desiring to marry, sought another appointment. A new Protestant parish had just been formed at Divonne, a little village of the district of Gex, which had belonged to France since 1602, but was now under the religious jurisdiction of Geneva; and there Antoine obtained the position of pastor.

Once installed, he sought to pacify his conscience. Revealing his inmost convictions to no one, he secretly observed a thoroughly Jewish mode of life, saying his prayers in Hebrew and observing all the Mosaic rites. In his public services he pronounced the name of Jesus as seldom as possible. He was never known to read the apostolic confession audibly. In the communion service, instead of the words "This is my body, this is my blood" he was once heard to say "Your Savior remembers you". His sermons, the texts for which were taken exclusively from Isaiah and the other prophets, became celebrated far and wide; yet they lacked any peculiarly Christian characteristics.

Most of the parishoners of Divonne were perfectly satisfied with their pastor, who was eloquent and kind toward them; they were not shocked by the vague form of his sermons, but the lord of the adjoining manor was outraged. One Sunday, Antoine preached on the second Psalm, which, according to orthodox Christian theology, announces the coming of the son of God. Antoine instead declared that God had no son and that there was but the one God. This was too much for the lord, who remonstrated loudly with the pastor and threatened to denounce him to the synod.

Antoine fell into gloomy despair; a nervous attack deprived him of his reason. To several colleagues from Geneva who had come to see him he began to chant the seventy-fourth Psalm, then he suddenly stopped, and, exclaiming that he was a Jew, blasphemed Christianity. He was put to bed but he escaped his watchers, passed the night wandering through the country, and was found the next morning in Geneva in a most pitiable condition, kneeling in the streets and calling loudly upon the God of Israel. He was placed in an asylum for the insane on Feb. 11, 1632. Medical treatment accomplished but little for him. His clerical colleagues did all they could to induce him to change his religion but he never ceased to proclaim that he was a Jew and desired to remain a Jew.

== Imprisonment and execution ==
A charge of heresy could no longer be avoided; the chief of the Geneva police arrested Antoine, and instituted proceedings. While he was in prison the clergy were tireless in seeking his reconversion, trying in vain to make him sign a declaration of orthodox faith. Bidden to formulate his religious belief, he drew up twelve articles, which were submitted to an ecclesiastical court. In them he gave the tenets of Judaism in the style of Maimonides' Thirteen Principles of Faith, and added "eleven philosophical objections against the dogma of the Trinity." At the same time he addressed to the judges three memorials, two of which have been preserved. In spite of the exertions of Metrezat, a pastor of Paris, and others, the judges were immovable.

The trial commenced April 11; Antoine's dignified attitude aroused much sympathy. The threats of the judges were of no more avail than the persuasions of his colleagues. He repeated constantly: "I am a Jew; and all I ask of God's grace is to die for Judaism." The court sought to show that he had promulgated his heretical doctrines at Geneva: this he contradicted most forcibly. All the efforts of the judges were met with the unchanging reply, "With the help of God I am determined to die in my present belief." Fifteen clergymen or professors of theology were summoned as witnesses. Several of them begged for a light sentence, since, in their opinion, Antoine had committed no sin by becoming a Jew, although for his hypocrisy he deserved unfrocking or banishment, or, at worst, excommunication. Furthermore, they said that the matter ought not to be hastened, and that the advice of the various churches and academies should be sought. A majority, however, insisted that the judges should seize the opportunity to demonstrate their faith, since it was most dangerous to absolve one who had professed Judaism while wearing the garb of a Christian priest. For some days longer the judges waited for Antoine to recant. As his recantation was not forthcoming, they pronounced sentence April 20, 1632; condemning him to be loaded with chains, placed upon a pyre, to be there strangled, and then burned. In vain the clergy petitioned for a respite; Antoine was executed the same day.

His execution divided the citizens of Geneva and was the last public burning of heretics in the city.
