= Günter Ruch =

German writer and politician (1956–2010)

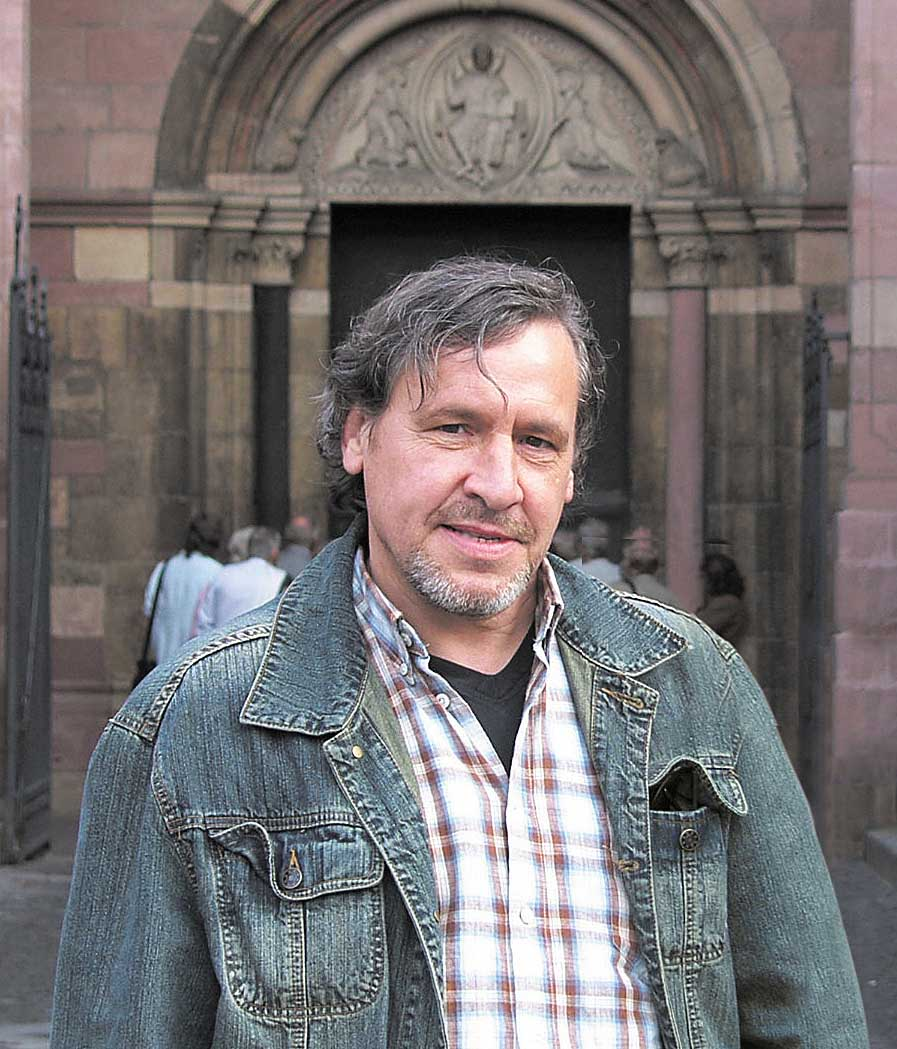
Günter Ruch in 2007.

Günter Ruch (born 19 August 1956 in Sinzig, Rhineland-Palatinate, died 18 December 2010 in Bad Neuenahr-Ahrweiler) was a German writer, journalist, politician of the FDP and author of contemporary, fantasy and historical novels. He lived in Bad Neuenahr-Ahrweiler, where, on 18 December 2010, he died of cancer.

== Works ==
- 1996: Die Farbe der Nacht. Nitzsche (Fantasy)
- 2002: Genovefa. Rhein-Mosel-Verlag (historical novel)
- 2005: Burg Hammerstein. Club Bertelsmann (historical novel)
- 2006: Die Herrin von Burg Hammerstein. Droemer Knaur (historical novel)
- 2006: Genovefa. Audiobook, Verlag TechniSat Digital
- 2007: Gottes Fälscher. Club Bertelsmann (historical novel)
- 2008: Der Krüppelmacher. Verlag Philipp von Zabern (historical novel)
- 2009: Gottes Fälscher. Droemer Knaur (historical novel)
- 2010: Die Blutkönigin. Verlag Philipp von Zabern (historical novel)
