= Joseph Perles =

Joseph Perles (1835–1894), Hungarian Jewish rabbi.

== Biography ==
Perles born in Baja Hungary on November 26, 1835. Having received his early instruction in the Talmud from his father, Baruch Asher Perles, he was educated successively at the gymnasium of his native city, was one of the first rabbis trained at the new type of rabbinical seminary at Breslau, and the university of that city (Oriental philology and philosophy; Ph.D. 1859, presenting as his dissertation Meletemata Peschitthoniana).

Perles was awarded his rabbinical diploma in 1862. He had already received a call, in the autumn of the previous year, as preacher to the community of Posen; and in that city he founded a religious school. In 1863 he married Rosalie, the eldest daughter of Simon Baruch Schefftel. In the same year he declined a call to Budapest; but in 1871 he accepted the rabbinate of Münich, being the first rabbi of modern training to fill that office. As the registration law which had restricted the expansion of the communities had not been abrogated until 1861, Perles found an undeveloped community; but under his management it soon began to flourish, and in 1887 he dedicated the new synagogue. He declined not only a call to succeed Abraham Geiger as rabbi in Berlin, but also a chair at the newly founded seminary in Budapest. He died at Munich on March 4, 1894.

== Works ==
Perles' most important essays were on folklore and custom. There is much that is striking and original in his history of marriage (Die jüdische Hochzeit in nachbiblischer Zeit. Eine archäologische Studie, 1860), and of mourning customs (Die Leichenfeierlichkeitcn ins nachbiblischen Judenthum, 1861), his contributions to the sources of the Arabian Nights (Zur rabbinischen Sprach- und Sagenkunde, 1873), and his notes on rabbinic antiquities (Beitrage zur rabbiniscizen Sprachund Altertumskunde, 1893). Perles' essays are rich in suggestiveness, and have been the starting-point of much fruitful research. He also wrote an essay on Nachmanides, and a biography and critical appreciation of Rashba (1863).
