= Abba Saga =

Son of Ethiopian emperor Zara Yaqob

Abba Saga was the son of the Ethiopian emperor Zara Yaqob, and a monk of Ethiopian Christianity. His teacher was Abba Sabra, a monk of Ethiopian Christianity. He rebelled against his father after his conversion to Judaism and took refuge in Hoharwa mountains with a Jewish monk named Abba Sabra. Later Abba Sabra and Abba Saga, established a separate kingdom in modern-day Ethiopia in which Jews were not persecuted, unlike the kingdom, of his father, who was known as "the exterminator of the Jews" in which Jews were severely persecuted. The two formed the Falasha form of monasticism on lines similar to those of the Christians.
