= Nachman Fahrner =

Israeli musical artist

Nachman Fahrner נחמן פהרנר
- Born: September 21, 1972 (age 53); Paris, France
- Genres: Roots rock, Americana, rockabilly, rock
- Occupations: Singer, songwriter, musician
- Instruments: Guitar, vocals
- Years active: 1987-present
- Website: www.fahrnermusic.com

Nachman Fahrner (Hebrew: נחמן פהרנר; born September 21, 1972) is a contemporary religious Jewish musician in Israel. He is a convert to Judaism. Fahrner's main influences are Elvis Presley, Django Reinhardt, 1940s and 1950s blues, R&B, and rockabilly. He received encouragement from Luther Allison and was a long-time friend of French jazz guitarist Patrick Saussois. Both his musical styles and songwriting distinguish him from other religious musicians who often combine traditional Jewish music with folk/rock elements and choose their lyrics from verses from the Torah.

== Career ==
Fahrner started singing and playing rhythm guitar as a child after discovering Elvis Presley through his parents' record collection. He performed at school events and parties.

At age eleven he began teaching himself lead guitar by playing along with records by Memphis Slim, Elvis Presley, and Luther Allison. An encounter with Allison left a profound impression on a young teenage Nachman. While shaking hands, Allison looked at their black and white hands and said, "Black and white. That is what rock and roll is all about." Around this time Fahrner discovered the music of gypsy jazz guitarist Django Reinhardt.

Fahrner career as lead guitarist began in 1988 when he joined the Roadrunners a rockabilly bands with a female lead singer. In 1990, he moved to Paris and was hired by the teddy boy/rockabilly band Jim and the Beams. The band toured Europe, performing primarily for biker and rocker audiences. Fahrner became part of the Parisian Gypsy jazz scene through friends Jean-Yves Dubanton and Patrick Saussois and incorporated this style into his guitar playing.

By the mid 1990s, he was in demand as guest player, playing with acts such Claudia Colonna and French rockers Hotel Du Nord. In 1999 Nachman, a descendant of Turkish Jews, declined an offer to join Patrick Saussois' band so that he could travel to Israel and convert to orthodox Judaism.

Since then, Fahrner has taught guitar and performed in Israel and Europe. He was the founder and leader of the Jerusalem Swing Jam" He started writing songs with an emphasis on spiritual themes, in particular the teachings of Rabbi Nachman of Breslov. In 2012 he released the album Azamra, a collection of original songs, as well as Early Recordings, volumes one and two.

== Discography ==
- Minor Swing (1991)
- Azamra (2012)
- Early Recordings vol.1 - Rockabilly (2012)
- Early Recordings vol.2 - Jazz (in memory of Patrick Saussois) (2012)
