= Paulina Beturia =

Roman convert to Judaism (c. 50 CE)

Veturia Paulla (also given as Beturia Paulla, Beturia Paulina, Paulina Beturia, etc.; known after her conversion as Sara) (date unknown, possibly within 200 CE - 600 CE) was a Roman convert to Judaism. According to a Latin epitaph, found on a fragment of her sarcophagus within the Jewish catacombs of Rome, she was eighty-six years and six months old at the time of her death. For the last sixteen years of her life she was a Jew, and was honoured as mother of the synagogues ("mater synagogarum") of the Campesian and Volumnian communities in Rome.
