= Moses Prado =

German convert to Judaism

- Born: Conrad Victor; Germany
- Died: Salonica, Ottoman Empire (now Greece)

Moses Prado (fl. 16th and 17th centuries) was a Christian convert to Judaism who lived Marburg, Germany, and Salonica, Greece. His Christian name at birth was Conrad Victor, and he was a professor of classical languages at the University of Marburg. After rejecting Christianity, in 1607 he went to Salonica, where he embraced Judaism, assuming the name of Moses Prado. After seven years in Salonica he began asking permission from the Duke of Hesse to return to Marburg, where he had left his wife. In a series of letters to an old friend in Marburg named Hartmann, Moses justified his conversion to Judaism. He argued that the truth of Judaism was beyond question, since both Muslims and Christians are compelled to acknowledge it. He asked the Duke of Hesse to be as tolerant as the sultan, who he said granted freedom of conscience to every man. The permission was refused, and Moses remained in Salonica until his death.
