= Ernst von Manstein =

German army officer (1869–1944)

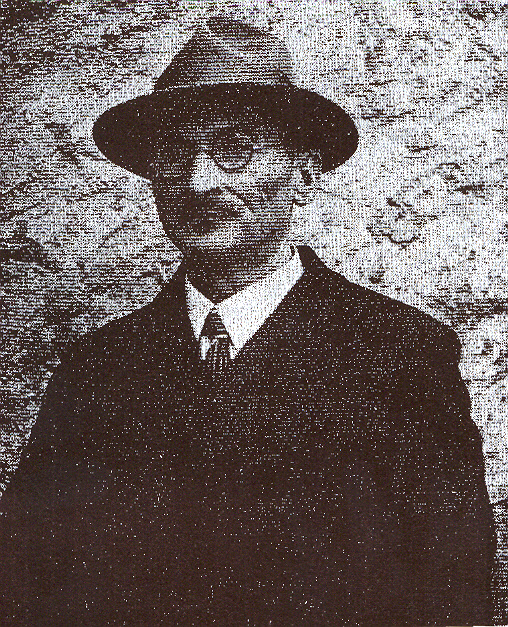
- Born: Ernst Abraham Albrecht von Manstein; 19 May 1869; Domersleben near Magdeburg, Province of Saxony, Germany
- Died: 17 January 1944 (aged 74); Würzburg, Greater German Reich
- Education: University of Strasbourg
- Occupations: Army officer; Teacher

Ernst Abraham Albrecht von Manstein (19 May 1869 – 17 January 1944) was a German army officer, teacher and notable convert to Judaism. A member of the aristocratic von Manstein family, he was related to the Second World War-era field marshal Erich von Manstein. He served briefly in the Imperial German Army, during which time he was posted to Würzburg. Whilst there he became involved in the Jewish community and met his Jewish-born wife. He converted to Judaism in 1892 and was disowned by his family.

Von Manstein subsequently became a teacher before the rise to power of the Nazi Party in 1933 forced him out of his job. He attempted to emigrate to Palestine but was unable to do so due to the Second World War. After the majority of Würzburg's Jews were deported to concentration camps in the east, von Manstein, who was exempt due to his Aryan origin, made a formal request to join them, but this was denied. He lost his valuable musical instrument collection to the Nazis and was made to live in a single building with the city's remaining Jews. He allegedly recanted his faith, under duress, in October 1942, before falling ill and dying in 1944. The Nazi Party seized his body and he was buried in a non-Jewish cemetery with full military honours, despite the objections of his friends. A post-war campaign led to him being reburied in the Jewish cemetery next to his wife in 1960.

== Early life ==
Ernst Albrecht von Manstein was born on 19 May 1869 at Domersleben, near Magdeburg in the Province of Saxony. The von Manstein family was of Freiherr (baronial) rank and had provided both Prussia and Russia with senior military officers and generals. Erich von Manstein, one of Hitler's most senior generals and later field marshal, was the adopted son of Ernst's brother.

Von Manstein grew up in a ranger's lodge and had a keen interest in nature. He was also a gifted musician and after receiving a commission in the 9th Infantry Regiment served in its band.

== Conversion to Judaism ==
Von Manstein's regiment was deployed to Würzburg, Bavaria in 1890. He became acquainted with the city's Jewish community who shared his interest in music and began to attend their religious gatherings and study Judaism. Von Manstein met novelist Franziska Bezold (known as Franny), 19 years his senior, in Würzburg and fell in love with her. She was the orphan of Jewish parents and had been raised as a Christian. The couple married in 1892 and decided to convert to Judaism together in a ceremony in Amsterdam on 13 December 1892. The place of von Manstein's circumcision has been stated as both Amsterdam and in the Jewish (Rothschild) Hospital in Frankfurt. Von Manstein adopted the name of Abraham following his conversion and took to wearing the kippah. His family were displeased with the conversion and broke off all contact with him; he also resigned his army commission.

Von Manstein studied art history at the University of Strasbourg before returning to Würzburg to teach drawing and music at the Jewish seminary and at private schools. Von Manstein owned a house with a large garden in Keesburgstrasse. He adhered to the Jewish Halakha laws including the Kil'ayim prohibiting the mixing of seeds, had daily lessons in the Talmud and attended the synagogue three times a day. Von Manstein was a member of the synagogue council and the committees of two Jewish schools. He was prominent in the music scene, being part of a musical quartet and occasionally conducting the city orchestra.

== Under Nazi rule ==
Following the rise to power of the Nazi Party in 1933, von Manstein came under pressure to renounce his faith and sever his connections to the Jewish community, which he refused to do. He had worked as an art teacher, but under the Law for the Restoration of the Professional Civil Service of 1933, he was dismissed from his position due to his religion. As increasing numbers of Jews were made homeless by the Nazis, he opened his house to refugees, among them the child Yehuda Amichai, who would later become a famous Israeli poet. Von Manstein was formally certified by the Nazis as being of pure Aryan descent, but Jewish by religion, only on 30 March 1939. Despite the discrimination he experienced, he continued to use the heil greeting until forbidden to do so (and from wearing the colours of the Nazi party) on 13 July. Shortly thereafter, von Manstein sold his house, being intent on moving to Palestine and submitted a formal request to emigrate on 24 November 1939. This permission was granted on 18 April 1940, but was contingent on him relinquishing German citizenship and transferring all his property to the German state. By this time, the Second World War had made any move impossible. Von Manstein subsequently had to move between different rented homes.

Franny died in March 1941, and von Manstein arranged for her burial in the city's Jewish cemetery with a headstone designed by him. Approximately 1,500 of Würzburg's Jews were deported to the east, many being sent to the Theresienstadt concentration camp. Von Manstein formally applied to the Nazi authorities to join them, but was refused. Instead, he was placed, along with all of the city's remaining Jews, in a single building on Domerschulstrasse that subsequently became known as the Judenhause. At around this time, von Manstein's valuable collection of musical instruments was destroyed by the Nazi authorities.

Von Manstein recanted his Jewish faith on 23 October 1942, presumably under duress. His health deteriorated and he was admitted to the hospital of the Stiftung Juliusspital Würzburg, where he died on 17 January 1944. The Nazi authorities seized his body and held a funeral at the city cemetery with full military honours, including a Nazi swastika flag on his coffin and uniformed SS pallbearers. Some of von Manstein's friends protested this, stating that he would have wanted to be buried alongside his wife in the Jewish cemetery.

In 1946, a former Würzburg rabbi, who had emigrated to the United States, began lobbying for his body to be moved to the Jewish cemetery. It took fourteen years before this could be achieved, one obstacle being that no cemetery fees had been paid since the war. Von Manstein was finally interred next to his wife on 22 May 1960.
