= Thomas Jones (English publisher) =

Publisher and bookseller in England (1791-1882)

- Born: 1791
- Died: 1882 (aged 90–91)
- Occupation: Bookseller

Thomas Jones (1791 – May 25, 1882) was a publisher and bookseller in London.

Born a Roman Catholic, he converted to Judaism. For many years he pursued the business of publisher and bookseller in Paternoster Row, London. He was well versed in Biblical literature, and was a frequent attendant at the Spanish and Portuguese synagogue, being specially scrupulous in his observance of the sacred festivals.

Later, by reason of ill health and reduced circumstances, Jones resided with his daughter, who was a Sister of Mercy at the Hospital of St. John of Jerusalem.
