= Abba Sabra =

15th-century Ethiopian monk and teacher

Abba Sabra (fl. c. 1450) was an Ethiopian Orthodox monk and the teacher of the children of Emperor Zara Yaqob of Ethiopia. Abba Sabra tried to convert the Beta Israel (Ethiopian Jews), but was instead converted by them to Haymanot (Judaism). He is best known for introducing monasticism to Beta Israel, and the tradition of Jewish monks continued down the centuries until the Great Famine of the 1890s decimated their monasteries in Lay Armachiho. He later converted the son of King Zara Yaqob, Saga Amlak, who adopted the religious name Abba Saga.

Later, Abba Sabra and Abba Saga established a separate kingdom in what is now Ethiopia in which Jews were not persecuted.
