= Salem Shaloam David =

Chinese convert to Judaism

Salem Shaloam David (1853−?) was a Chinese convert to Judaism.

== Biography ==
He was born in 1853 to Chinese parents in Hankou, China, who named him Feba. Feba remained with his parents until 1861, when his family were murdered during the Taiping Rebellion. He, along with other boys, was held captive by the rebels until they came within a short distance of Shanghai, where the rebels were routed and scattered by British soldiers under Charles George Gordon. Feba sought protection of Solomon Reuben, one of the volunteers, who presented him to David Sassoon & Co., Shanghai. Here S. H. David took him under his care; and in 1862 he sent him to Bombay, where he was admitted to the Jewish faith and named Salem Shaloam David. He was educated at the David Sassoon Benevolent Institution, and joined the firm of Elias David Sassoon & Co. in 1872; served in their Shanghai house from 1874 to 1882; and from 1882 was in their Bombay establishment. As a communal worker he was equally popular with the Jews and Bene Israel. He was honorary secretary to the Magen David Synagogue in Byculla and to the Jacob Sassoon Jewish Charity Fund, as well as to the Hebrath Kehat-Kadosh, Bombay. He was unanimously appointed by the last-named as visitor to the Jewish patients in the hospitals. He was a member of the Shanghai Society for Rescuing the Chinese Jews. He married Habiba Reuben Moses in 1883.
