= Yisrael Campbell =

Israeli comedian

- ישראל קמפבל
- Born: Christopher Campbell; Philadelphia, Pennsylvania, United States

Yisrael Campbell (Hebrew: ישראל קמפבל; born Christopher Campbell) is a Philadelphia-born Israeli comedian.

== Biography ==
Campbell, who is of Irish and Italian descent, grew up Catholic in a Philadelphia suburb. One of his aunts is a Catholic nun. A typical Campbell joke is that his aunt is a nun, "which of course makes Jesus my uncle, allowing for easier parking in Jerusalem." Campbell converted to Judaism with a Reform rabbi, and says that a "spiritual hunger" led him to have a second conversion with a Conservative rabbi. On a four-month visit to Israel in 2000 he decided to have a third conversion and live as an Orthodox Jew.

Campbell and his wife Avital, an Orthodox rabbi, have four children, including twins, and live in Jerusalem.

Campbell and his wife both attended The Pardes Institute of Jewish Studies.

The Guardian wrote that "As far as we know, Lenny Bruce never had sex with an Orthodox Jew, but if he had – he would have produced Yisrael Campbell."

In 2006, Campbell appeared with the Israeli-Palestinian Comedy Tour.

Campbell is the subject of a 2008 documentary film, Circumcise Me.
