= Ernst Sebastian von Manstein =

Ernst Sebastian von Manstein (Russian: Себастьян Эрнст фон Манштейн; 1678 – 24 June 1747) was a Baltic German in Russian Empire military service, also a statesman.

He was in Russian Empire service since 1719. From 1736–1738, he was General-Governor of Governorate of Estonia.
