= Sarah Haider =

Pakistani-American ex-Muslim activist

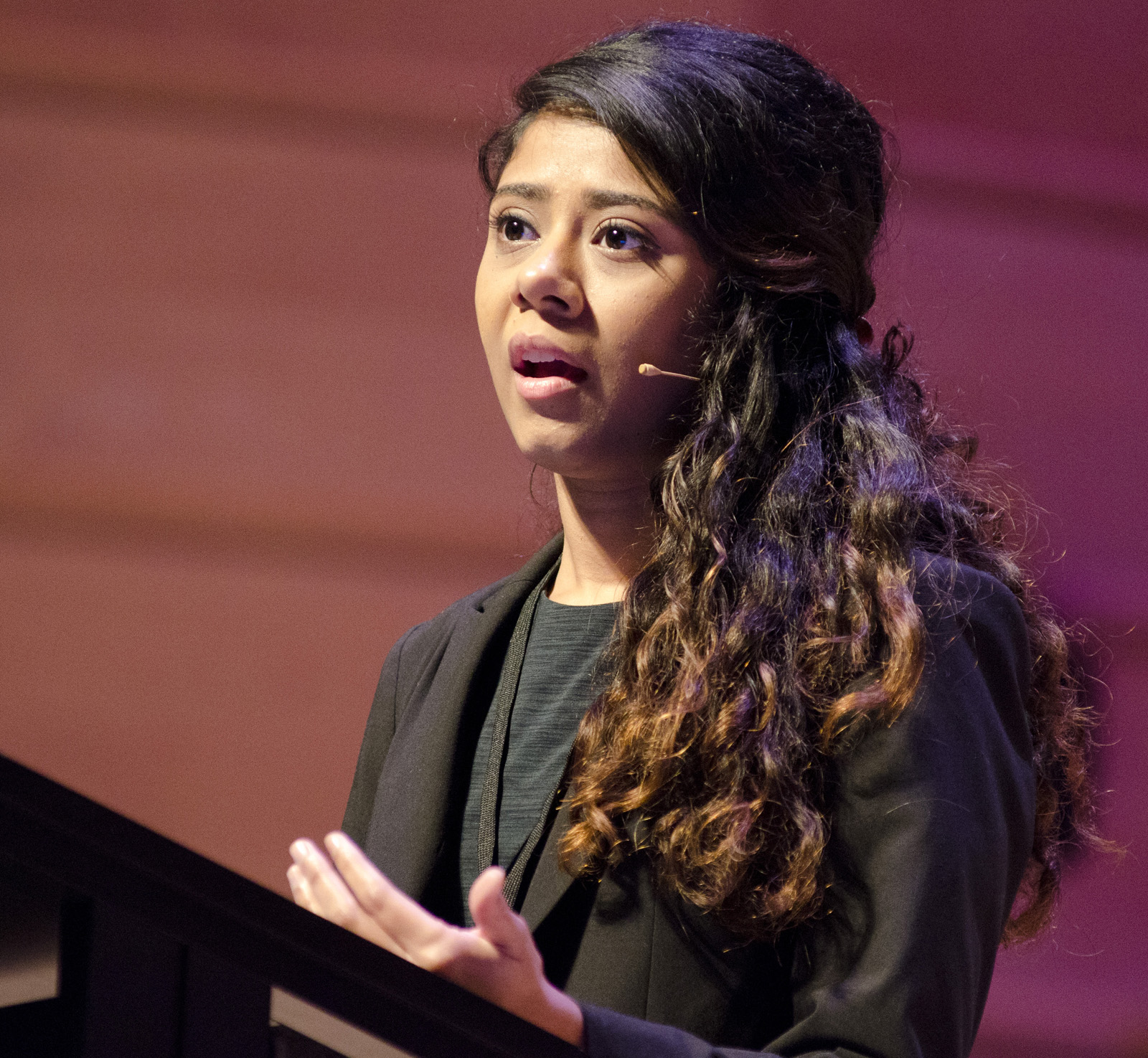
- Haider addressing the 2017 convention of the Australian Skeptics
- Born: March 27, 1991 (age 35); Karachi, Sindh, Pakistan
- Occupations: Director of Development for Ex-Muslims of North America; writer; public speaker; political activist
- Years active: 2013–present
- Known for: Co-founding Ex-Muslims of North America
- Movement: Secularism
- Children: 1

Sarah Haider is an American writer, public speaker, and political activist. She cofounded the advocacy group Ex-Muslims of North America (EXMNA), which seeks to help former Muslims. She is the former executive director for EXMNA.

== Personal life ==
Haider was born in Karachi, Pakistan in a Muhajir Twelver Shia family. Her family moved to the United States when she was seven years old and she was raised in Houston, Texas. She was a devout Muslim as a child. In a 2017 interview with the blog Gene Expression, she said of her religious participation:

I dressed modestly to deflect attention from my body, and to the bemusement of my parents, I chose to don the hijab for a short period. I stayed away from drugs or sexual encounters of any kind, complied with dietary restrictions, and prayed as regularly as I could.

She became an atheist at the age of 16. She believes that she was lucky enough to have a relatively liberal father who may not have let her wear shorts or have boyfriends but still allowed her to read any books she wanted, including those critical of Islam, and allowed her to move away from home to go to college. Her journey into questioning religion began when her atheist friends in high school started having debates with her. One of her friends would print off "horrible" verses from the Quran and would hand them to her without any further commentary. She set out to prove her atheist friends wrong and started studying the Quran to understand the context of these verses. However, she stated that sometimes the context was worse and she slowly became an atheist herself.

Her father has since become an atheist as well. Haider described the journey to atheism with her father to the Reason Rally in 2016 as a long series of debates spanning over a decade. However, it was not until her father discovered Facebook groups of other Pakistani atheists that had active members who were his age that he felt comfortable leaving Islam. She now advises ex-Muslims to find their family secular peers to make them more comfortable leaving religion.

After finishing college, she moved to Washington, DC, and became involved with non-profit and social advocacy groups. This involvement inspired her to launch her own non-profit advocacy group later on. She currently lives in Washington, DC.

== Activism ==
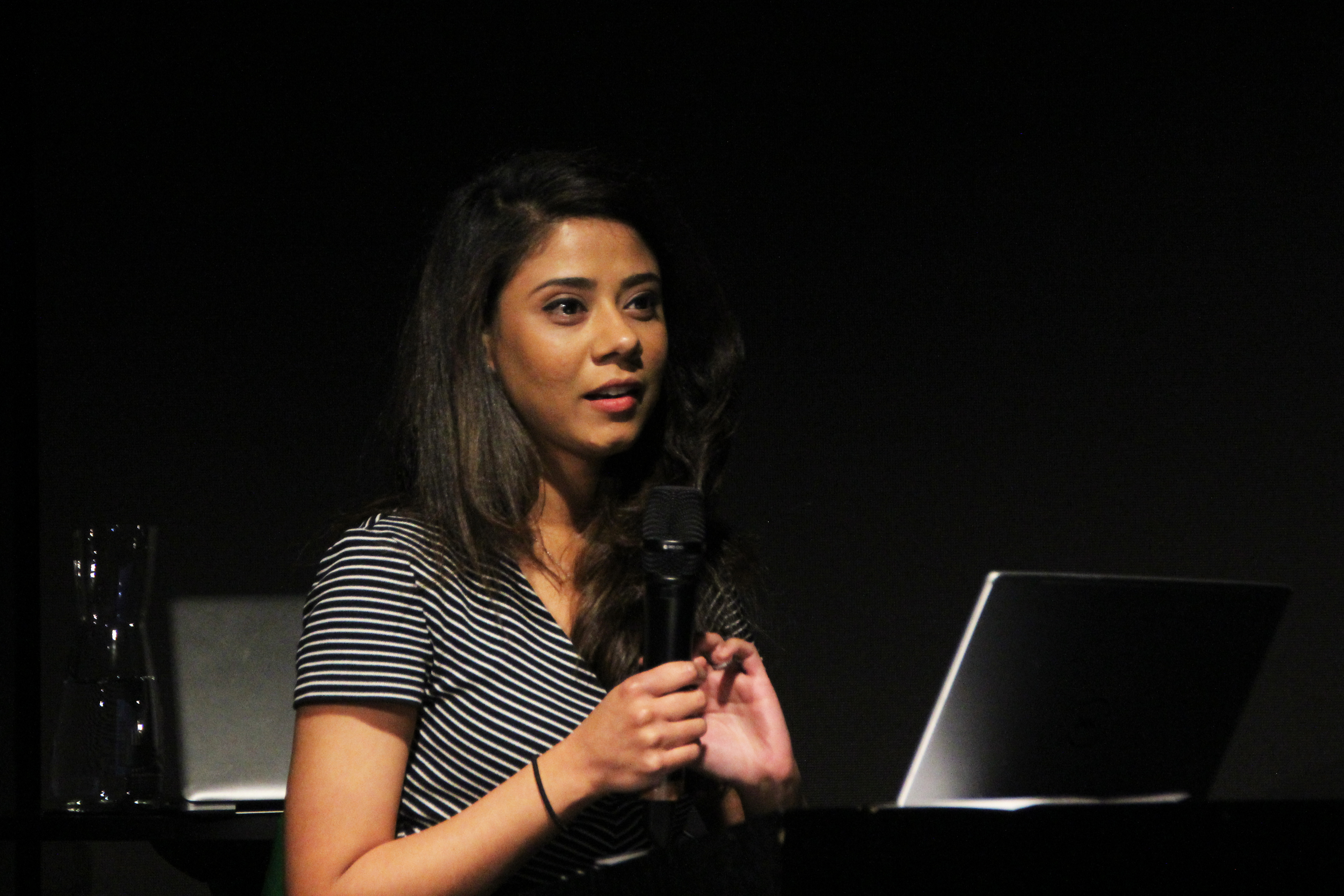
Sarah Haider - Den Utrolige Ateismen 15.11.19, Oslo--Arr- Ateistene & Human-Etisk Forbund Foto- Bjarne Henning Kvaale @quevaal

Haider explains the goals and actions of EXMNA (2017).

Muhammad Syed, Sarah Haider and Heina Dadabhoy speaking at the American Atheist Convention 2015

In 2013, Haider and Muhammad Syed co-founded Ex-Muslims of North America (EXMNA), an advocacy organization and online community which aims to normalize religious dissent and to helping create local support communities for those who have left Islam. The organization was first based in just Washington, DC, and Toronto, but is now active in over 25 locations in the United States and Canada.

EXMNA believes Muslim communities often shun those who are accused of apostasy as well as their families and that fear of excommunication and violence makes it dangerous for closeted ex-Muslims if they are exposed as disbelievers. They have stated that Islamic "apostates live with a level of threat that influences every aspect of life," because when someone leaves the faith they often lose their community and social support including their mosque, their friends, and even potentially their family. This is the reason why EXMNA believes that it is very important to normalize dissent in religious communities and why they have created a network of social support for those who chose to leave Islam. Due to the fear of apostates being "outed," EXMNA has a lengthy screening process to ensure the security and safety of EXMNA members.

In 2015, she gave a speech called "Islam and the Necessity of Liberal Critique" at the American Humanist Association's 74th annual conference in Denver, Colorado, that has been widely viewed since uploaded to YouTube. During an interview with Dave Rubin she said she was nervous to deliver the speech, believing the topic of Islam and dissent to be "sensitive", yet was delighted at how well the speech was received. Haider, a self-described liberal, is disheartened by what she feels is a hostile attitude towards Ex-Muslims by her fellow liberals. She has said women who leave Islam often "face ostracism, beatings, harassment and threats from their families and communities, forced travel back to home countries to pry them free of Western influence, and forced marriage," and therefore should be among the most welcomed by the liberal community. However, she feels that she and other Ex-Muslims are shunned by the left, having been called an Islamophobe. Haider has stated that this makes the position of Ex-Muslim atheists precarious because "the political right is not our friend. We don't have allies on the right due to our atheism," but at the same time she feels Ex-Muslims also have very few allies on the left.

In 2017, Haider decided to take EXMNA on a tour around the United States and Canada to speak at college campuses throughout the 2017–2018 academic year. EXMNA spoke on a variety of topics that affect Muslims and ex-Muslims.

In 2023, Haider was a panelist in a public debate co-sponsored by The Free Press and the Foundation for Individual Rights and Expression, titled "Has the Sexual Revolution Failed?". She argued in the negative, that it has not failed, alongside Grimes and against Anna Khachiyan and Louise Perry.

== See also ==
- Ali A. Rizvi, Pakistani-born Canadian ex-Muslim activist and writer
- Aliyah Saleem, Pakistani-born British ex-Muslim activist from Faith to Faithless
- Maryam Namazie, Iranian-born British ex-Muslim activist
- Muhammad Syed, Pakistani-American writer, speaker, and political activist who helped Sarah Haider co-found Ex-Muslims of North America
- Fauzia Ilyas, Pakistani-born Dutch ex-Muslim activist
- Ibn Warraq, India-born Pakistani ex-Muslim scholar-writer and humanist
- List of ex-Muslim organizations
