= List of ex-Muslim organisations =

List of Islamic Apostasy Organizations

The Central Council of Ex-Muslims, founded in Germany in January 2007, was the first of its kind.

An Arabic Ex-Muslim symbol, it has the first part of the Shahada (لاإله) meaning "there's no god"

This is a list of organisations that aim to support individuals that have renounced Islam sorted by date of founding.

Name	Founded	Region served	Notes
Central Council of Ex-Muslims (ZdE)	2007	Germany	First ex-Muslim organisation.
Council of Ex-Muslims of Britain (CEMB)	2007	United Kingdom	
Central Committee for Ex-Muslims	2007	Netherlands	Dissolved in 2008.
Former Muslims United	2009	United States	
Ex-Muslims Initiative	2010	Austria	Founded as Council of Ex-Muslims of Austria
Movement of Ex-Muslims of Belgium	2011	Belgium	
Association of Ex-Muslims of Switzerland	2012	Switzerland	Founded by Kacem El Ghazzali.
Atheist Republic	2012	Worldwide/International	Founded by Armin Navabi in Iran as "Iranian Atheists" on Orkut.
Atheist & Agnostic Alliance Pakistan	2012	Pakistan	
Ex-Muslims North Meetup Group	2012	Northern England	Based in Bradford.
Council of Ex-Muslims of Singapore	2012	Singapore	
Muslimish	2012	United States	welcomes both ex-Muslims and Muslims
Ex-Muslims of North America (EXMNA)	2013	Canada; United States	
Council of Ex-Muslims of France (CEMF)	2013	France	
Council of Ex-Muslims of Morocco (CEMM)	2013	Morocco	
Ex-Muslims of Scotland	2014	Scotland	
Association of Atheism	2014	Turkey	First legal atheist organisation in Turkey.
Faith to Faithless	2015	United Kingdom	Founded by Aliyah Saleem and Imtiaz Shams.
Platform New Freethinkers	2015	Netherlands	Supported by the Humanistisch Verbond.
Ex-Muslims of Norway	2016	Norway	
Atheist Alliance of the Middle East and North Africa	2016	MENA	
Council of Ex-Muslims of Sri Lanka	2016	Sri Lanka	
Iranian Humanist Atheists & Agnostics	2016	Iran	
Ex-Muslims of South Africa	2016	South Africa	
Ex-musulmani d'Italia	2016	Italy	Supported by the Unione degli Atei e degli Agnostici Razionalisti.
Council of Ex-Muslims of Jordan	2018	Jordan	
Alliance of Former Muslims	2017	Ireland	
Faithless Hijabi	2018	Australia	
Ex-Muslims of the Netherlands	2019	Netherlands	
Iranian Atheists & Agnostics	Unknown	Iran	
Council of Ex-Muslims of New Zealand.	Unknown	New Zealand	
Central Committee for Ex-Muslims of Scandinavia	Unknown	Scandinavia	
Ex-Muslims of Kerala	2019	India	Observes January 9 as ex-Muslim day
Young Apostates	2021	United States	Voice Of Ex-Muslims

== See also ==
- Apostasy in Islam
- Apostasy in Islam by country
- Ex-Muslims
- List of former Muslims
