= Irreligion in the Maldives =

Irreligion in the Maldives is a social taboo, and irreligious people are systematically socially and legally discriminated against.

== Law ==
The Constitution of the Maldives designates Islam as the official state religion, and the government and many citizens at all levels interpret this provision to impose a requirement that all citizens must be Muslims. The Constitution states the president must be a Sunni Muslim. There is no freedom of religion or belief. This situation leads to institutionally sanctioned religious oppression against non-Muslims and ex-Muslims who currently reside in the country.

On 27 April 2014, the Maldives ratified a new regulation that revived the death penalty (abolished in 1953, when the last execution took place) for a number of hudud offences, including apostasy for persons from the age of 7 and older. The new regulation was strongly criticised by the Office of the United Nations High Commissioner for Human Rights and the EU's High Representative, pointing out that they violated the Convention on the Rights of the Child and the International Covenant on Civil and Political Rights, which the Maldives have ratified, that ban the execution of anyone for offences committed before the age of 18.

== Incidents ==
=== Mohamed Nazim ===
During a question-and-answer session at one of Indian Muslim orator Zakir Naik's lectures on 29 May 2010 on the Maldives, a 37-year-old Maldivian citizen named Mohamed Nazim stood up and announced that he was struggling to believe in any religion and did not consider himself to be a Muslim, Nazim further asked what his verdict would be under Islam and in the Maldives. Zakir responded that he considers the punishment for apostasy not necessarily to mean death since Muhammed was reported in the Hadith scriptures to on some occasion to have shown clemency towards apostates, but added that if a Muslim apostate speaks and propagates against Islam under Islamic Sharia rule then the apostate should be put to death.

Mohamed Nazim was reported to have been arrested and put in protective custody by the Maldivian Police. He later publicly reverted to Islam in custody after receiving two days of counseling by two Islamic scholars, but was held awaiting possible charges.

=== Ismail Mohamed Didi ===
On July 14, 2010, Maldivian news site Minivan News reported that 25-year-old air traffic controller Ismail Mohamed Didi had sent two emails, dated June 25, to international human rights organisations declaring that he was an atheist ex-Muslim and that he desired help with his asylum application (directed to the United Kingdom) due to increased repression from family and colleague shunning and anonymous death threats via phone. The same day that the report was posted, Didi was found hanged in the aircraft control tower at Malé International Airport in an apparent suicide.
