= Ali A. Rizvi =

Journalist and ex-Muslim secular activist

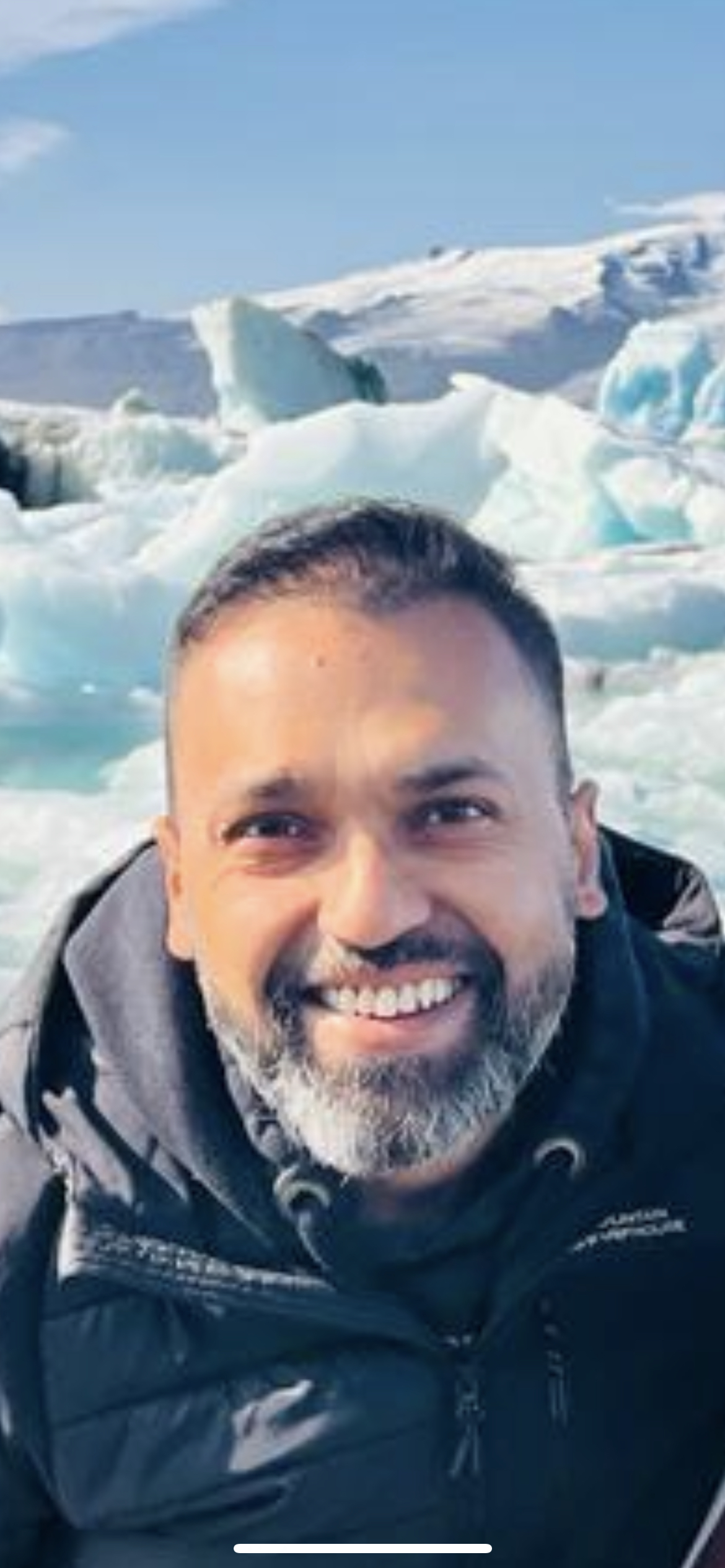
- Ali A. Rizvi in Iceland, August 2023
- Born: Ali Amjad Rizvi; 29 May 1975 (age 50); Lahore, Pakistan
- Education: Oncologic pathology
- Alma mater: Aga Khan University; University at Buffalo; McMaster University
- Occupations: Oncologic pathology; Journalist; Author; Political activist
- Known for: Atheist and secular activism, science communication
- Ali A. Rizvi's voice Recorded April 2018
- Website: atheistmuslim.com

Ali Amjad Rizvi (born 29 May 1975) is a Pakistani-born Canadian atheist ex-Muslim and secular humanist writer and podcaster who explores the challenges of Muslims who leave their faith. He wrote a column for the Huffington Post and co-hosted the Secular Jihadists for a Muslim Enlightenment podcast together with Armin Navabi.

== Early life ==
Rizvi was born in Lahore, Pakistan, in 1975 into a "moderate to liberal Muslim family." He spent his early childhood in Libya, later moving to Saudi Arabia where he attended the American International School in Riyadh, which he describes as a school exclusively for the children of ex-pat families living in Riyadh, limiting his exposure to Saudi culture and customs. Both his parents were educated in North America, and taught at a Saudi university. Rizvi's family and other expats referred to a square in Riyadh where public beheadings took place as "Chop-chop Square".

The family lived in Saudi Arabia for over ten years. As Ithna’Asheri Shia Muslims, they had to be careful when practicing their faith, disguising a religious service as "dinner" when watching a Shia mullah preach on television, ready to switch it off in case the religious police would raid the house. Rizvi and his parents had little understanding of the Quran nor the daily prayers, since these were in Arabic, a language they barely understood. Rizvi says that when he bought an English translation of the Quran one day and started reading it, he was shocked by statements about decapitating unbelievers in Islam (Quran 8:12-13), amputation of the hands of thieves (Quran 5:38) and violence against women (Quran 4:34), amongst other things. He confronted his parents with it; he claims they were equally dumbfounded. Rizvi then undertook a diligent study of the Quran and the Sunnah; this caused him first to question and eventually to lose his faith.

Rizvi finished medical school at Aga Khan University in Karachi, then immigrated to Canada as a permanent resident in 1999. At McMaster University he earned a Master of Science in biochemistry and later spent five years specializing in pathology at State University of New York at Buffalo.

== Career ==
As well as his formative work in oncologic pathology and now medical communications, Rizvi has written for news outlets including Huffington Post, CNN.com and New York Post. He has spoken and written about issues affecting ex-Muslims and Muslims, as well as his own experiences of being an apostate, and challenges widespread misinformation about Muslims. He says that he rejects the conflation of radical Islam with the general Muslim population and stated "Human beings have rights and are entitled to respect. Ideas, books, and beliefs don't, and aren't." He rejects the validity of the term Islamophobia, which he claims shames critics of religion to be silent. He has also spoken about western attempts to legislate on the wearing of the burqa and niqab, saying, "Freedom of choice also means the freedom to make bad choices, and to me, the best way to fight bad ideas is with good ideas, not bans."

By 2011 his writing and secular interests were taking precedence so he changed career to medical communications to be able to devote more time to writing.

In 2015 Rizvi made a special report for CNN bringing attention to the case of his friend Raif Badawi, a Saudi author and dissident imprisoned in Saudi Arabia on several charges including apostasy.

In 2017, Rizvi launched the Secular Jihadists from the Middle East podcast together with ex-Muslims Armin Navabi (Atheist Republic), Faisal Saeed Al Mutar (Global Secular Humanist Movement) and Yasmine Mohammad (Confessions of an Ex-Muslim). In January 2018, the show was renamed Secular Jihadists for a Muslim Enlightenment, with Rizvi and Navabi as co-hosts, which fans can support through Patreon.

In 2018, Rizvi appeared in Islam and the Future of Tolerance, a documentary based on a conversation between Sam Harris and Maajid Nawaz. In the documentary, Rizvi shares his personal experiences growing up in a Muslim-majority country.

== The Atheist Muslim ==
Maryam Namazie interviews Rizvi about The Atheist Muslim.

Rizvi is the author of The Atheist Muslim: A Journey From Religion to Reason published by St. Martin's Press in 2016. It is a combination of personal biography and analysis of arguments in favour of rejecting Islam through "reformation; secularism; and, finally, enlightenment." It has been described as "thoughtful, articulate, well documented, logical" by The New York Times, "a treasure of compelling logical arguments and gripping personal stories" and praised for presenting "Rare and intriguing arguments in the debate over Islam." The Globe and Mail described it as "passionate, timely but, ultimately, muddled plea for reform in Islam."

Rizvi describes the meaning of the title as follows: "In the Muslim world, there are countless freethinkers, atheists and agnostics who cannot openly speak about their views. These are people who are irreligious in their minds, but they have to pretend to be Muslim. They all live a contradictory life. That's the contradiction in my title. Secondly, it satirises the idea that you can always cherry-pick religious traditions. I have a friend who calls herself a 'feminist Muslim'. What does that mean, I asked her? Like a meat-eating vegetarian? Well, she said, of course there are passages that discriminate against women in the Quran that I take issue with, but everyone cherry-picks, and so do I."

According to Rizvi, writing his book "would have been unthinkable about 20 years ago", recalling the outcry against Salman Rushdie's The Satanic Verses (1988 and onwards) and the Jyllands-Posten Muhammad cartoons controversy (2005–2006), but arguing that criticism of Islam had been largely normalised by the late 2010s.

As of April 2018, The Atheist Muslim has been translated into Indonesian and Dutch, and an Arabic version is underway.

Rizvi was the 2016 winner of the Morris D. Forkosch book award for The Atheist Muslim.

== Views ==
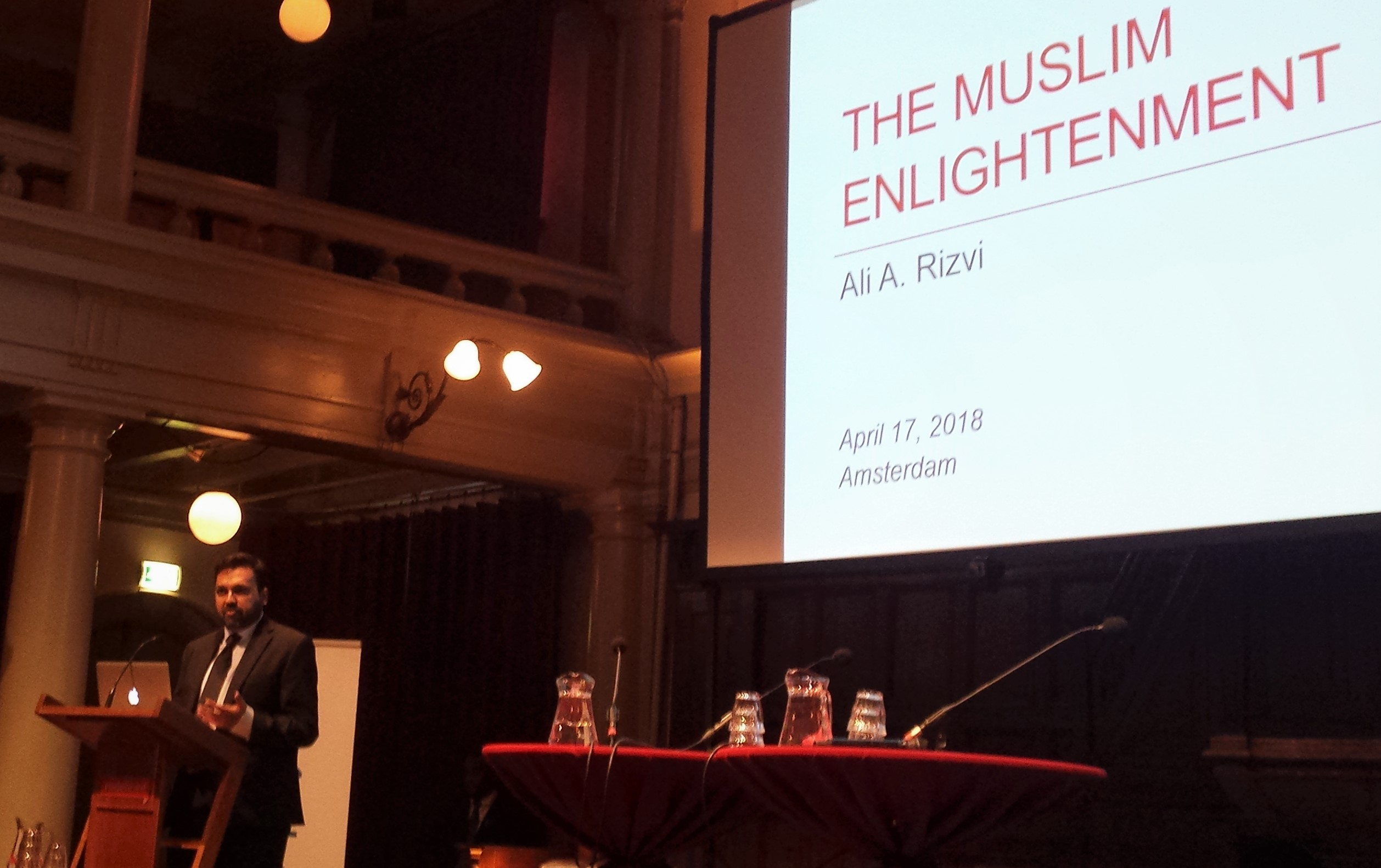
Rizvi lecturing on the Muslim Enlightenment in Amsterdam (2018)

In interviews and speeches, Rizvi frequently quotes a statement from ex-Muslim activist Maryam Namazie: "The Internet is doing to Islam what the printing press did to Christianity." "Thanks to the Internet, Muslims see more of the world. They look for translations of Quranic texts, and discuss them in chatrooms and forums. Secularism amongst Muslims is therefore much more visible and becomes normal."

He opined that "some parts of the Old Testament do sound a lot like the handbook of Islamic State, but by far most Christians and Jews don't take it seriously at all anymore, because they no longer regard their books as the literal, infallible word of God. ... This provides them a way out. However, by far most Muslims still do consider the Quran the literal, infallible word of Allah. In countries where the Pew Research Center surveyed this, more than 80% of Muslims believe this. This figure is the same in the United States, where Muslims are better educated and integrated into society than in Europe."

The fact that many Muslims support execution for apostasy, but exempt their relatives and friends, is an example of what Rizvi calls "the cognitive split in many moderate Muslims' minds: on the one hand they wish to remain loyal to the ideology, but it's unclear to what degree they actually support it. They live in two worlds. ... When I ask some of my extended family members [whether apostates should be killed], they agree. But when I ask them whether I should be killed too, because after all, I'm an apostate myself, they say: 'No, not you; you are a nice guy.'"

I criticise both the left and the right. The left should realise criticism of Islam is to be encouraged because it will make the world more liberal and free. The right should realise not all Muslims are bad and should be sent back or bombed.

— Ali A. Rizvi

Rizvi has stated that right-wing populist politicians are correct in challenging "authoritarian, totalitarian ideas that are in the scriptures", although many other people including Muslims themselves have also done that throughout the ages. On the other hand, Rizvi opposes special Muslim profiling, demonisation of Muslims and a ban on Muslim immigration to the West, because that unfairly discriminates and excludes people, including vocal ex-Muslim critics of Islam. He laments the fact that both the regressive left and the far-right make no "distinction between Islam – the ideology; and Muslims – the people." He argued that radical groups such as the Muslim Brotherhood and Hamas popularised the term 'Islamophobia' on purpose, to equate bigotry against Muslims with 'completely legitimate criticism of Islam' as a religion, in order to silence the latter.

Islamic terrorism itself is utterly unable to defeat the West, Rizvi argues, but if Western governments take away the Enlightened values and civil liberties to appease paranoid citizens' sense of security, "that's how they [the terrorists] will win."

== Personal life ==
Rizvi plays guitar in the rock band Dead Shyre with his brother Zameer Rizvi.

Rizvi has said that he and his ex-wife would regularly receive death threats from Muslim fundamentalists, neo-Nazis, and members of the far-right, mostly from people outside Canada.

== See also ==
- Aliyah Saleem, Pakistani-born ex-Muslim activist from Faith to Faithless who has lived in Mississauga, Ontario
- Criticism of the Quran
- Ex-Muslims of North America, co-founded by Pakistani-American ex-Muslim activists Muhammad Syed and Sarah Haider
- Fauzia Ilyas, Pakistani-Dutch ex-Muslim activist
- Maajid Nawaz, Pakistani-British liberal Muslim activist
- Raif Badawi, Saudi liberal Muslim activist
