= Armin Navabi =

Iranian-born ex-Muslim atheist and secular activist

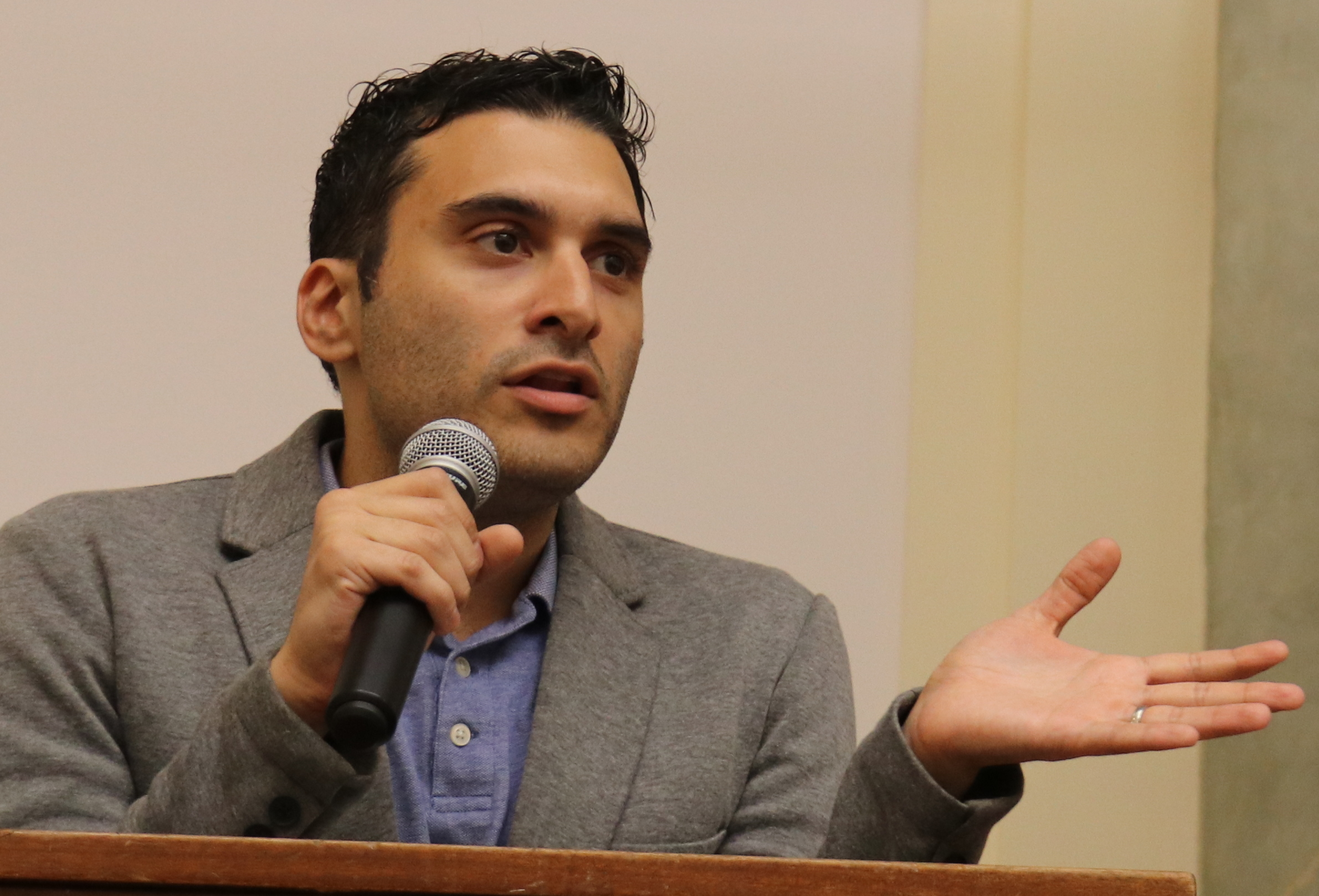
- Navabi speaking at the Atheist Days 2019 in Warsaw.
- Born: 25 December 1983 (age 42); Tehran, Iran
- Occupations: Political Activist; Author; Speaker; Podcaster
- Known for: Secular activism; Human rights activism; Ex-Muslim; Atheist Republic
- Notable work: Why There Is No God: Simple Responses to 20 Common Arguments for the Existence of God
- Movement: Liberty, Patriotism, Secularism
- Website: Official website

Armin Navabi (Persian: آرمین نوابی; born 25 December 1983) is an Iranian-Canadian ex-Muslim atheist, author and podcaster, currently living in Vancouver, Canada. In 2012, he founded the online freethought community Atheist Republic, a Canada-based non-profit organisation which now has hundreds of branches called "consulates" in several countries around the world such as Malaysia, Indonesia, and the Philippines, enabling non-believers to interact in societies where irreligion, apostasy, and blasphemy are often criminalised and repressed. As an author, he debuted with the book Why There Is No God (2014), and in 2017 he became a co-host of the Secular Jihadists from the Middle East podcast with Ali A. Rizvi and others. In 2026, at the time of the Iranian Lion and Sun Revolution and massacre of the Iranian people on January 8-9, 2026, Navabi transformed Atheist Republic into Liberty Politics , an online political community that aims to unite patriots and supporters of liberty globally. According to its stated objectives, the project opposes Islam, communism, the woke left, and the woke right, and is a forum for discussion of, and participation in, political and geopolitical developments.

== Biography ==
=== Youth ===
Navabi was born in 1983 and raised as a Shia Muslim in Tehran. He briefly moved to Germany in 1985 and London in 1986, before returning to Tehran in 1988. His family was liberal and not particularly devout, but in school he was taught to believe in a literal hell and that committing even the smallest sin would get him there. Navabi reasoned that if the afterlife was supposed to last for eternity, then this should be everyone's top priority while alive on Earth. Yet he found that most of those around him, though claiming to believe this, did not act like it was of the utmost importance. To avoid hell at all costs before reaching the "age of reason" at the onset of puberty, he considered suicide, since any sin (including suicide) committed before then supposedly did not 'count', even if this would only take him to the lowest part of heaven. At age 12, Navabi attempted suicide by jumping out of his school window, but was unsuccessful. It left him in a wheelchair for 7 months, and he missed one year in school.

=== Apostasy and emigration ===
After his suicide attempt, Navabi felt guilty about distressing his family, and became a more fervent Muslim, and diligently studied Islam. However, as he learned more, he began to doubt the religion, noting the high toll on Muslims' everyday life, and the idea of punishment of all non-Muslims with eternal torture. Studying other religions increased his skepticism. A milestone event was reading a book on the history of religion in college: "I saw how convenient it was to change the concept of God and what he wanted based on the politics of the time. Why do I even accept this as true? I'd never asked myself whether this could all just be made up." Fearing hell, Navabi prayed to God to reveal himself and prove that he was real. Navabi received no answer, lost his faith, and eventually concluded that God was imaginary.

Navabi attended the University of Tehran for about a year, studying molecular biology. When in college, Navabi was initially the only atheist he knew. However, when he confided in two university friends, revealing his atheism, they became skeptical about religion within weeks. This encouraged Navabi to look for fellow atheists on the internet. He obtained a student visa for the University of British Columbia to study finance, and left Tehran. He arrived in Vancouver on 10 October 2004, later becoming a permanent resident and obtaining Canadian citizenship. There, he created Atheist Republic in 2012, to build a global atheist community and a platform for his activism.

=== Deplatforming incidents ===
Navabi became a target of several deplatforming attempts in 2019.

In February 2019, Cherwell, a student newspaper at the University of Oxford, refused to publish an interview of Navabi in its online edition, on the grounds that it "may be considered offensive" to Muslims. The interview was published in the newspaper's print edition. The profile editor, Freddie Hayward, who conducted the interview resigned in protest.

In March 2019, Mount Royal University in the Canadian city of Calgary cancelled a scheduled speaking event featuring Navabi, organised by the Atheist Society of Calgary. The university stated that it was unwilling to host the event after the Christchurch mosque shootings, but "would absolutely have the speaker come to our campus at another time". In August, Alberta Minister of Advanced Education Demetrios Nicolaides (UCP) said Navabi's deplatforming and similar incidents should have been prevented, and that Nicolaides was working on a stronger academic free speech policy.

== Atheist Republic ==
=== Foundation ===
While still living in Iran, Navabi founded the group "Iranian Atheists" on Orkut around 2003, to connect with other nonbelievers in his country. He was shocked, surprised and delighted there were so many others like him, and those feelings were mutual: "It felt like coming home to a family you didn't even know you had." After some time, Navabi decided to try to reach atheists beyond the Islamic Republic of Iran, and created the contrastingly named page "Atheist Republic" on Facebook in January 2012. It was followed by the Facebook Group in February 2012, and the website www.atheistrepublic.com later in 2012, which as of July 2017 received approximately 5 million views per week. According to Navabi, Atheist Republic brings nonbelievers together from around the world, promotes LGBTQ and women's rights and fights against the persecution of atheists. According to Navabi, these liberation values, that AR seeks to spread, are under attack from Islamism, the alt-right and the regressive left.

=== Growth ===
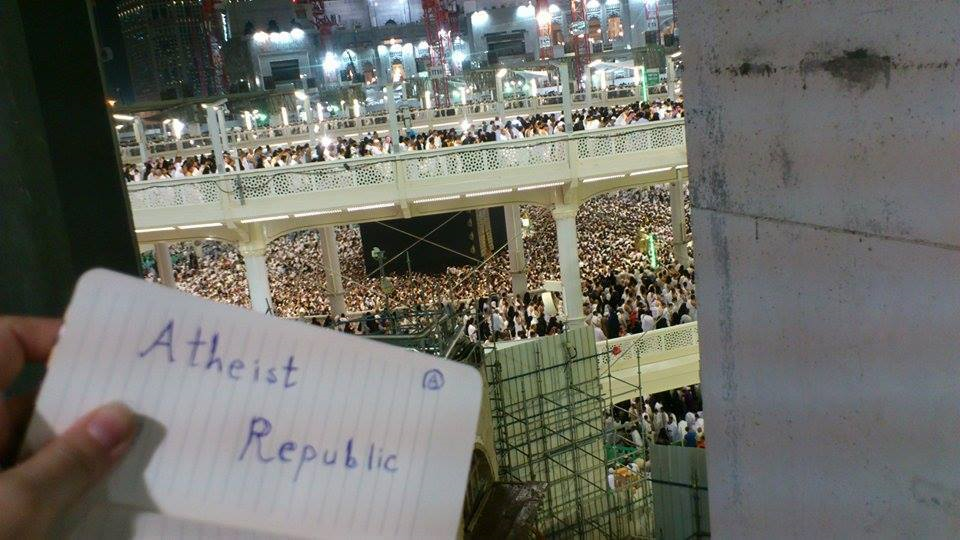
Rana held this Atheist Republic paper in the Great Mosque of Mecca.

Speaking of the Atheist Republic community on BBC Trending in June 2014, Navabi said: "We want people to realise that they're not alone. We want people to realise they don't have to be ashamed of who they are."

In 2014, Syrian ex-Muslim Rana Ahmad was having trouble in her family, so she sought and found the help of Atheist Republic as well as other similar organisations online. When her family forced her to come along with the hajj, she took a picture of herself holding a piece of paper with "Atheist Republic" written on it, while standing inside the Great Mosque of Mecca, the holiest site of Islam. She subsequently fled to Germany, aided by Atheist Republic and Faith to Faithless.

As of May 2017, Atheist Republic's Facebook page had 1.6 million followers; this number grew to 2.1 million followers by February 2019.

=== Islamist Facebook reporting scandal ===
In May 2017, admins of the Atheist Republic claimed their Facebook page had been shut down three times after what appeared to be a co-ordinated campaign by religious activists. With over 1.6 million likes at the time, it was alleged to be "the most popular atheist community on any social network." Having been restored again, Atheist Republic requested to be exempt from the automatic "unpublication" system that is activated as soon as the page is flagged often enough, which leaves any page vulnerable to be shut down by sheer numbers of opponents.

Atheist Republic was not the only victim; there were coordinated Islamist campaigns using the slogan "Report Anti-Islamic Pages" targeting similar atheist, secularist and ex-Muslim pages and groups on Facebook such as Ex-Muslims of North America (which had a group with 24,000 members at the time) and 10 other groups. Atheist Republic's CEO Allie Jackson and Ex-Muslims of North America's president Muhammad Syed made joint efforts to get the pages and groups back online, and launched a Change.org petition (which gathered over 8,000 signatures). On 10 May 2017, Atheist Republic and nearly 40 other secular, atheist and ex-Muslim organisations wrote an open letter to the Facebook administrators to request an improvement to its reporting system to protect "vulnerable groups" against religious fundamentalists' abuse of the reporting function. A Facebook spokesperson responded that they were "very sorry" for the erroneous removal of pages, and that the company had restored them as soon they were able to investigate.

=== Malaysian government crackdown attempts ===
In August 2017, a picture from a gathering of the Atheist Republic Consulate of Kuala Lumpur was posted on Atheist Republic's Facebook page. Deputy Minister of Islamic Affairs Asyraf Wajdi Dusuki ordered an inquiry into whether the people in the photograph had committed apostasy, which is illegal in Malaysia, and ex-Muslims can be fined, jailed or sent for counselling. The next day a Minister in the Prime Minister's Department Shahidan Kassim went as far to say that atheists should be "hunted down" as there was no place for groups like this under the Federal Constitution. Atheist Republic members present at the gathering who received death threats on social media were being investigated about whether they had 'spread atheism to Muslims', which has also been outlawed in the country. Navabi asked: "How is this group harming anyone?", warning that such actions by the government damaged Malaysia's reputation as a "moderate" Muslim-majority (60%) country. The uploads sparked violent protests from some Malaysians who called Navabi an 'apostate' and threatened to behead the Atheist Republic's leader.

Under the pseudonym of "Michael" one of the Kuala Lumpur AR Consulate admins told BBC OS that meetings occur about two or three times a year between people who normally only communicate on the internet:

When we meet, we just sit down, we get to know each other (...), we have drinks, we eat a bit, and we just talk about our lives, that's it. (...) Of course, it will involve people who are legally Muslims, atheists and people from other religions as well. Basically we want to get to know each other better and we want to be friends. (...) And so we took a group picture and asked Atheist Republic to post it. Next thing you know, some Malaysian Muslim groups got hold of the picture (...) and made assumptions about Muslims being among those in the picture. [Through the media] it lands at the government, who then act surprised at the existence of ex-Muslims in Malaysia and that something needs to be done. (...) A lot of people, especially those involved in the photos, are now going into hiding because we don't know what's gonna happen. (...) Of course [I'm afraid too]."

In November 2017 the government and the internet regulator Malaysian Communications and Multimedia Commission had demanded that Atheist Republic's page and similar atheist pages on Facebook be taken down. However, Facebook refused to do so because the pages did not violate any of the company's community standards.

In February 2019 Navabi expressed his frustration that "there were no consequences. Malaysia didn't feel the wrath of the international community, like you would if you said we need to hunt down the Jews or Muslims. As you should obviously: there need to be major consequences for that, and thankfully there are. But why aren't there consequences of saying we need to hunt down the atheists?”

=== Conflict with Indians ===
In September 2020, Navabi reported backlash from Indians after posting an obscene image of Kali with the caption "sexy Kali" on twitter. Several accounts reported him, and the Universal Hindu Council filed a complaint against him for "hate speech". After that, Facebook blocked Atheist Republic page in India following orders from the Indian government.

== Works ==
- Navabi, Armin; Hise, Nicki (2014). Why There Is No God. Simple Responses to 20 Common Arguments for the Existence of God. CreateSpace Independent Publishing Platform. pp. 128. ISBN 9781502775283.
