= WikiIslam =

Anti-Muslim and anti-Islam website

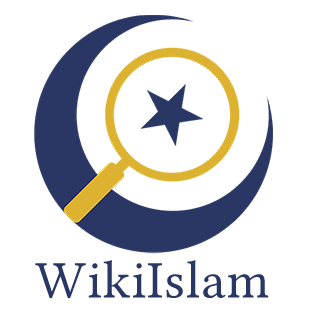
- Owner: Ex-Muslims of North America
- Founder: Ali Sina
- Website: wikiislam.net
- Launched: 4 September 2006; 20 years ago
- Current status: Active
- Content license: CC BY-NC 3.0

WikiIslam is an anti-Muslim and anti-Islam wiki. The website was founded by Ali Sina in 2006, and was originally maintained by his organization, Faith Freedom International, part of the counter-jihad network. In 2015, the website was acquired by the Ex-Muslims of North America It underwent a major revision in 2020, and currently presents itself as a critical encyclopedia focused on Islam.

Multiple scholars have characterized the site as Islamophobic, arguing that it selects content to portray Muslims negatively and promotes a monolithic image of Islam. A 2024 study of the site following its revision found that while the site often presents conflicting scholarly interpretations, its information remains "far from neutral", its topic selection is biased, and it continues to have hardly any information presenting Muslims positively or neutrally.

== Overview ==
The website was registered on October 27, 2005, and launched on September 4, 2006. It was founded by Ali Sina, an Iranian-born Canadian ex-Muslim, and originally maintained by his organization, Faith Freedom International, (Note: FFI has stated that its aim is to "unmask Islam and help Muslims leave [the faith]".) part of the counter-jihad network. As of 2013, among the site's aim was to act in defence against a perceived "global threat" of Muslims and Islam; the site described its purpose as "collect[ing] facts relating to the criticism (Note: As used on WikiIslam, to be "critical" has meant holding preconceived negative opinions of Muslims and Islam.) of Islam from valid Islamic sources" without the effect of "[politically correct] censorship" that is common in Wikipedia. It rejected concerns of Islamophobia by arguing that Islam has been proved to be a "dangerous ideology". As a "community-edited website", the wiki was set to be edited and modified by (registered) approved netizens.

In December 2015, the Ex-Muslims of North America (EXMNA), a secularist organization, took ownership and operation of the site. As of 2018, (Note: In 2018, Larsson asked readers to consult his publications from 2007 and 2013 for scholarship on WikiIslam.) information on (alleged) internal contradictions in the Quran, persecution of non-Muslims and ex-Muslims, follies of Muhammad etc. were held; a narrow focus was maintained on "violence, sexuality and gender conflicts". Also as of 2018, apostasy testimonies were featured too and the site held a list of 101 provocative questions which are to be asked of any Muslim to prove that Islam is not a "true religion", running in tune with the site's active encouragement to criticize Muslims. The same year, WikiIslam was noted to feature slurs about Muhammad. The site's content is available in multiple languages.

Following a major revision around 2020, a study published in 2024 found that WikiIslam articles generally present how Muslim scholars have historically addressed specific questions and that internal disagreements among scholars are often included. However, contemporary discussions and progressive interpretations of controversial topics are rarely represented.

== Reception ==
In 2007, Göran Larsson, Professor of Religious Studies at University of Gothenburg, argued that WikiIslam is an Islamophobic web portal (Note: Larsson's 2007 view was summarized by Ruth Tsuria, an expert on the intersection of digital media and religion: "Larsson argues that WikiIslam takes a closed attitude in its understanding of Islam, and so should be seen as an Islamophobic web portal." However, Larsson conceded that since WikiIslam contained a list of links to other websites—such as that of the Middle East Media Research Institute—, it was difficult to argue that all information posted on the site was Islamophobic.) and that the stories on WikiIslam were selected only to show that Muslims are "ignorant, backward or even stupid". In a 2014 survey of "anti-Muslim websites", Larsson profiled WikiIslam's apparent aim as "present[ing] Islamic history, theology and practitioners in a way which leaves the reader with an exceedingly negative image of the faith". He repeated his position in 2018, citing WikiIslam as an example of an "anti-Muslim webpage."

In 2013, Daniel Enstedt and Larsson wrote that the website has been "often perceived as being anti-Muslim, if not Islamophobic," describing the then-present content on WikiIslam as part of a "negative and biased" representation of Islam that could "easily be turned into an important weapon in the hands of those who want to express anti-Muslim feelings"; the site propagated "an Islamophobic world view that present[ed] Islam and Muslims as diametrically opposite to all others." Both Enstedt and Larrson have contended WikiIslam's selection and presentation of Islamic topics to be "very one-dimensional" with "alternative interpretations [by Muslim theologians] seldom represented".

In 2019, Asma Uddin, an advisor on religious liberty to the OSCE and a fellow at the Aspen Institute, reiterated WikiIslam to be a "rampantly anti-Muslim website". The same year, Syaza Shukri, Professor of Political Sciences at International Islamic University Malaysia, deemed the lack of positive content on WikiIslam to demonstrate a "definite agenda": the promotion of a monolithic version of Islam—violent, oppressive, and unrepresentative of "how a majority of Muslims view their religion". Rabia Kamal, a cultural anthropologist based at University of San Francisco, finds WikiIslam to be of the many Islamophobic websites dedicated to "surveillance" of Islam and Muslims.

In a study published in 2024, Edin Kozaric of Oslo Metropolitan University and Torkel Brekke of MF Norwegian School of Theology examined WikiIslam using a framework they termed the "scientification of Islamophobia," referring to how prejudice against Muslims can gain credibility through academic-style referencing and terminology. They noted that WikiIslam had made "a serious effort to re-invent itself as a scientific, neutral, and unbiased website", which they took as indicating that the site's current editors understood it "was in fact used in biased and problematic ways prior to this reformation". Nevertheless, their overall assessment was that the information WikiIslam presents about Islam is far from neutral: the site's topic selection is biased, and it continues to have hardly any information presenting Muslims positively or neutrally. Because WikiIslam's articles often present conflicting interpretations, they concluded it would be wrong to characterize WikiIslam as entirely Islamophobic. However, the site does not meet the standards set out in its vision document. Their primary concern was that WikiIslam positions itself as an objective encyclopedia while failing to acknowledge how its content is used elsewhere; their backlink analysis found that far-right websites such as Breitbart regularly cited WikiIslam articles to support anti-Muslim arguments.
