= Muhammad Syed =

Pakistani-American ex-Muslim activist

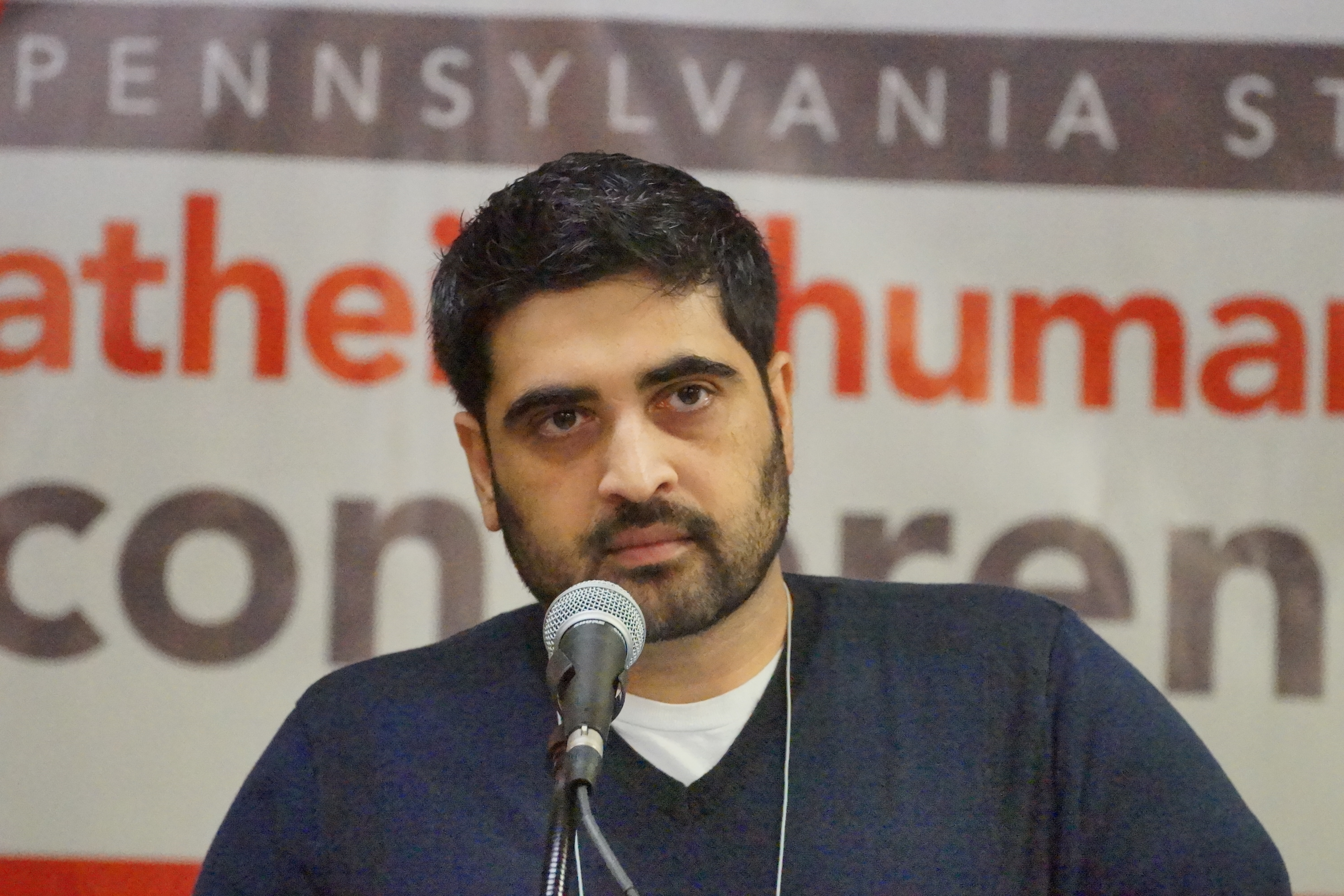
- Syed giving a talk at PASTAH CON in 2015
- Other name: Mo
- Occupations: President and executive director of Ex-Muslims of North America, writer, speaker, and political activist
- Years active: 2007–present
- Organization(s): President, Ex-Muslims of North America (EXMNA)
- Movement: Secular movement
- Website: https://www.exmna.org/

Muhammad Syed is a Pakistani-American writer, speaker, and political activist. He created the Ex-Muslims of North America (EXMNA) advocacy group in 2013 which seeks to normalize religious dissent and to help former Muslims leave the religion by linking them to support networks. He is the co-founder, executive director, and currently the president of EXMNA.

== Early life ==
Muhammed Syed was born in the United States and grew up in Pakistan. As a child he had a love for the sciences—mostly astronomy—and was a big fan of Star Wars and Star Trek. He came from a well educated background as both his parents had PhDs and describes his upbringing as "relatively liberal" from which his mother was particularly open minded. He further explained his experiences growing up in a 2016 interview with The Humanist: "My family is relatively pro-science. I was a Muslim who understood and accepted evolution." He said his understanding of evolution came mostly from the book Cosmos by Carl Sagan, which did not make him question his faith directly but set him on a path to secularism. He moved back to the United States in 2001, a few months before the September 11 attacks. He later became a software engineer.

== Activism ==
=== Anti-war protests ===
In 2001, after the September 11 attacks and the U.S. invaded Afghanistan, Syed joined anti-war protests. Syed attended a conference of the Islamic Society of North America, where Anwar Ibrahim (Malaysia's deputy prime minister, 1993–8) roundly condemned the recently uncovered Abu Ghraib torture and prisoner abuse by American soldiers (April 2004), which received loud applause from the audience. However, Anwar Ibrahim went on to say that prisons like Abu Ghraib or worse existed throughout the Muslim world, asked the audience how often they had spoken out against human rights violations against prisoners and others by Muslims in Muslim-majority countries, and accused them of hypocrisy (Anwar Ibrahim himself had been imprisoned in solitary confinement from April 1999 to September 2004). Syed saw this as a rare case of self-criticism and self-reflection from within the Muslim community, which he says had a profound impact on his way of thinking.

=== Apostasy ===
In the post-9/11 years, some of Syed's Pakistani friends became "ultra conservative", which made him "scared". After being fed up with conservative and radical Muslims, he started investigating his religion in more detail, because he wanted to understand Islam well enough to be able to advocate against conservatives. He spent about six months to a year reading scripture (the Quran and Hadiths) and secondary texts, and by the end of his studies he says he realized that the radical interpretation was actually more accurate than the moderate interpretation. He couldn't accept what he saw as the radical position, and thus that was the end of his belief in Islam.

Syed says it took him a while to admit the fact that he could no longer reconcile his understanding of science with the claims of Islam. However, when one of his friends attributed his recovery from leukaemia to God, whereas Syed knew a certain percentage of leukaemia patients survive regardless of God, 'I knew what he is saying is fantastical. It's not really real. It's an issue of probability. From there I thought: I understand this is all false, and I've understood it for a while, I just haven't self-acknowledged it.' Syed became an atheist in 2007.

In 2007, he decided to be public about his apostasy with a desire to engage in open dialogue and break the apostasy taboo. He says this move created a desire for him to take his anti-war efforts and refocus them towards religious dissent.

In 2012, Syed started organizing an Ex-Muslim Community in the Northeast Corridor surrounding the D.C. area. During the spring of 2013 he reached out to other Ex-Muslim Communities with the goal of creating an umbrella organization that would unify the communities. The combined efforts of these communities resulted in the creation of EXMNA.

=== Ex-Muslims of North America (EXMNA) ===
In 2013 Syed, along with Sarah Haider co-founded Ex-Muslims of North America, an advocacy organization and online community which aims to "normalize" religious dissent and to helping create local support communities for those who have left Islam. The organization was first based in just Washington, D.C. and Toronto, as of 2017 it was active in over 25 locations in the U.S. and Canada with over 1,000 workers and volunteers and a total of 24,000 members. The group tries to normalize dissent by doing seminars, giving speeches, and creating awareness campaigns. They also create and engage in protests and vigils for imprisoned dissidents and murdered atheists. The group's spokesman, Nas Ishmael, stresses that they criticize the ideology of the Islamic doctrine and "do not stand for any kind of anti-Muslim bigotry".

Muhammad Syed, Sarah Haider and Heina Dadabhoy speaking at the American Atheist Convention 2015.

In a 2014 article, The New York Times took note of the EXMNA motto: "No Bigotry and No Apologism" and described the group as welcoming. The BBC supported this evaluation, saying that the group is inclusive and has members from over 40 different ethnic backgrounds. EXMNA has a screening process so not just anyone can join, and they have a closed meeting policy for safety reasons. One must have an in person interview before being allowed to join and know when or where the group meetings are being held. The group explained their position on screenings as follows: "In the Muslim world, we are openly persecuted and regularly meet grisly ends. In the Western world we are safer, but even here open meetings can be a big risk."

In a 2014 interview with the Richard Dawkins Foundation, Syed further explained the risk involved, saying that many of their members have been beaten, disowned, and kicked out of their family homes. He also stressed the importance of the group for people who need resources to get help or simply to just talk to someone. Syed said he has members who break down and cry because it's the first time in years where they've felt like they belong. In a 2016 interview with Areo Magazine, the group said that a lot of their members are immigrants, so they have a difficult time fitting in with the broader American culture if they are disowned by their family and community.

In 2015, Syed appeared on The Mythicist Milwaukee Show run by the Mythicist Milwaukee secular organization in February and then gave a speech at American Atheists National Convention in April. The same year he gave a public lecture at the Center for Inquiry entitled "Blasphemy and the importance of dissent." In September 2016, he spoke at the annual conference of the American Humanist Association on the topic of "Examining Honor Culture & Violence in Islam."

In October 2017 Syed took EXMNA on a tour around the United States and Canada to speak at college campuses throughout the 2017-2018 academic year.

=== Reactions ===
In 2016, the Wegmans Food Markets in Fairfax, Virginia refused to bake a cake for the EXMNA. Muhammad Syed was confused and said "There is nothing about our name or logo that can be considered offensive to any reasonable individual." Attorney Andrew Seidel wrote a letter to Wegmans on June 20 describing their decision as a potential civil rights violation. The food market later reversed course and made the cake for the group.

In May 2017, Muhammad Syed's Facebook group for EXMNA (24,000 members) was shut down due to being targeted by Islamic fundamentalist groups. Other ex-Muslim atheist groups that were simultaneously taken down by the Islamist mass flagging operation (under the slogan "Report anti-Islamic pages") also included thousands or tens of thousands of members, and also targeted the public page of Atheist Republic (more than 1.6 million likes). In an open letter, Syed wrote that the Facebook and other social media platforms were not doing enough to protect vulnerable groups from malicious attacks. He further stated "Arab atheists, Bangladeshi secularists, and numerous other groups have been under attack for years, as religious conservatives in the Muslim world learn to abuse Facebook’s reporting system to their advantage." Together with Atheist Republic, Syed started a petition to get the groups reinstated and to further "prevent religious extremists from censoring atheists and secularists” in the future.

== See also ==
- Sarah Haider, Pakistani-American writer, speaker, and political activist that helped Muhammad Syed co-found Ex-Muslims of North America
- Ali A. Rizvi, Pakistani-born Canadian ex-Muslim activist and writer
- List of ex-Muslim organizations
