= Jamia Al-Hudaa =

Residential school for girls in Nottingham

Coordinates: 52.9680°N 1.1505°W

Location
- Forest House; Berkeley Avenue; Mapperley; Nottingham, Nottinghamshire, NG3 5TT; England

Information
- Type: Private boarding school
- Religious affiliation: Islam
- Established: 17 August 1996
- Department for Education URN: 131119 Tables
- Gender: Girls
- Age: 11 to 19
- Website: Jamia Al-Hudaa

Jamia Al-Hudaa (Arabic: جامعة الهدی) is an Islamic boarding school for girls in Mapperley Park, Nottingham, England. The dar-ul-uloom school was opened on 17 August 1996, by Maulana Sayyed Abul Hasan Ali Nadvi. It was one of the first Islamic boarding school for girls in the British Midlands. It uses the Deobandi form of Islam as its ideology.

Its campus, with about 75,000 square feet (7,000 m^{2}) of space, was formerly the head office of the Nottingham Health Authority. The school serves ages 10–19, with a boarding programme for those aged 11 onwards. There is a 7-year full-time course for 11+, in which students study national curriculum alongside Islamic studies and in the last two years of their course, they focus solely on Islamic studies. There is also a 16+ course which is a 3-year full-time Islamic studies course. Students can board or attend their classes daily if they live local.

== History ==
Ofsted gave the school a general inspection in 2010 and a welfare inspection in 2011, ranking it "good" in both cases.

In 2014, former student Aliyah Saleem, expelled from the school in 2006, criticised the school, stating that the curriculum was extremist.

In 2016, Ofsted stated that the school had bullying, a failure to safeguard the students, and poor training of employees, and that due to the "inadequacies" it would have to close its boarding programme. The Times wrote that therefore the school would be forced to end operations. The school asked the parents to remove their children from the campus on 18 October that year.

== Student body ==
As of 2015, the school had 243 full-time students including 171 boarding students; those living on campus made up about 85% of the students.

== Academic performance ==
As of 2016, 25% of its students received five grades in the ranks A*–C in the General Certificate of Secondary Education (GCSE) They are very good at Science, Maths and Urdu though with 89% of students getting 9–1 or A*–C in all 3 subjects.
