= Aliyah Saleem =

British author and secular activist

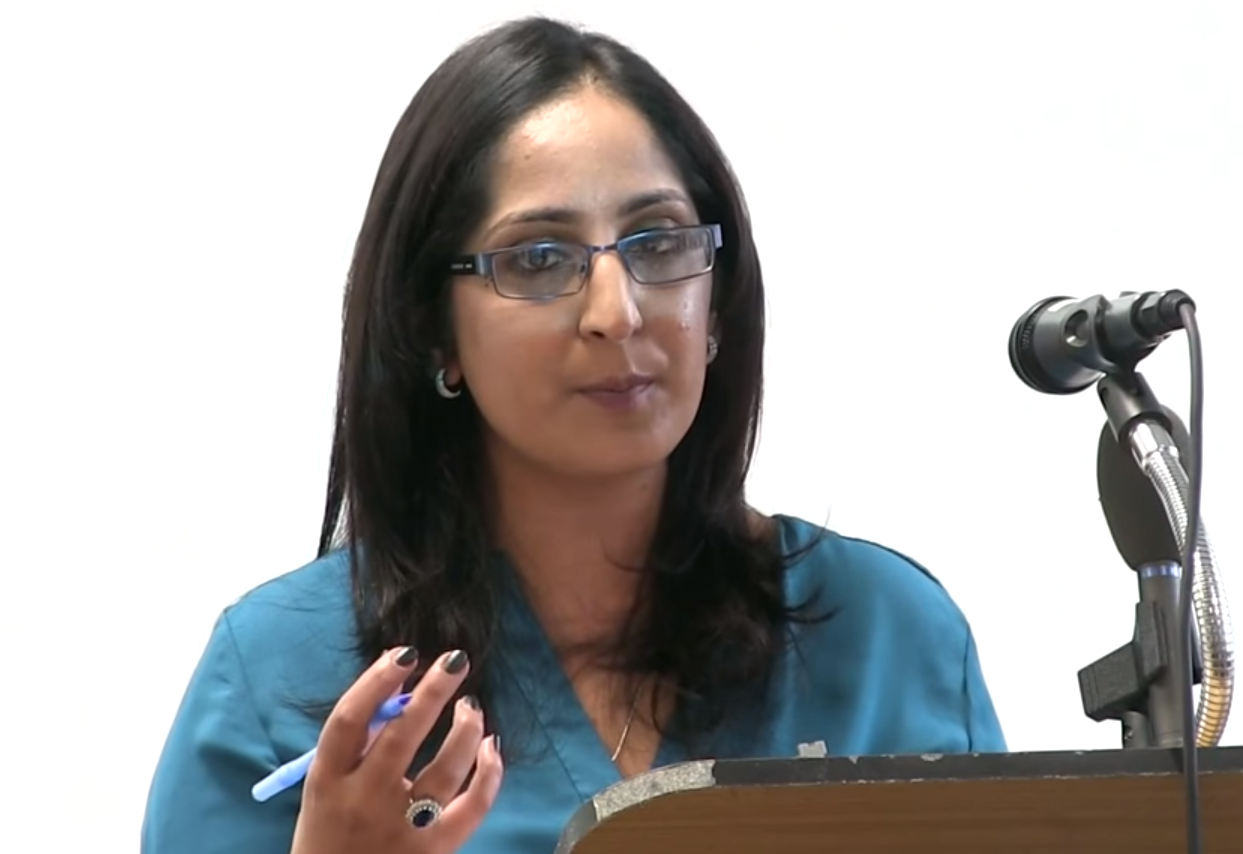
- Aliyah Saleem speaking at the Council of Ex-Muslims of Britain's Secular Conference 2015
- Born: August 1989 (age 37); London, United Kingdom
- Education: Brunel University (BA)
- Occupation: Researcher
- Known for: Ex-Muslim advocacy, secularism
- Notable work: Leaving Faith Behind
- Website: aliyahsaleem.wordpress.com

Aaliyah Saleem (born August 1989), is a British secular education campaigner, writer and market researcher. She is an ex-Muslim atheist, feminist and humanist activist, and co-founder of advocacy group Faith to Faithless. She has also written under the pseudonym of Laylah Hussain.

== Biography ==
Saleem was born in London into a Pakistani Sunni Muslim immigrant family in August 1989. From age 6 to 11 she attended Deobandi Arabic-led madrasas, where she learnt the Arabic language. When she was 11 years old, Saleem entered the Islamic girls' private boarding school Jamia Al-Hudaa in Nottingham. Around 12, she began having doubts about the truth and ethics of religion, especially the condemnation of homosexuality, but her questioning was branded "corruption" and she felt repeatedly repressed to "not pollute the minds of other girls". She was expelled in 2006 at the age of 15, accused of "narcissism" for owning a disposable camera and consequently publicly humiliated in front of the entire school.

She went on to study Koranic interpretation at Farhat Hashmi's Al-Huda Institute in Mississauga near Toronto, Canada, which was intended to last a year. Finding the lessons in Urdu difficult, however, after two months she transferred to the Al-Huda Institute's campus in Pakistan to complete the course and, segregated and isolated from her family, she found herself "sucked in" by the repetition and religious zeal. She started to willingly wear the face veil (niqab), and in hindsight she considered her 17-year-old self to be a fundamentalist who wanted to proselytise when she returned to the UK.

Back in Britain, where Saleem was no longer in a religiously restricted environment and had free access to books, media and television, her earlier doubts resurfaced. She started studying sociology, which examined religion from several new perspectives such as feminism and Marxism, and first exposed her to the concept that religions could serve as a means of social control. In the library, she came across Richard Dawkins' book The God Delusion, which first exposed her to the idea that God could be a human delusion and might not actually exist, and the theory of evolution, which she did not understand, and decided to spend a great deal of time on studying further. After that, she educated herself on cosmology, and read Carl Sagan's Pale Blue Dot; the sight of the iconic Pale Blue Dot photograph was the last straw, brought her to disbelief and made her a sceptic. By the age of 19, Saleem had reached a point where she no longer believed in Islam, and moved away from it. She believes that "The Islam that I grew up in, that had been, you know, shoved down my throat for years, was actually being shoved down my throat to actually control me. To control what I did, what I wore, who I spoke to, and what I ate and how I thought."

Saleem attended Brunel University in west London where she obtained a first class honours degree in English. She is a market researcher for Kantar Group having previously done parliamentary research work for the House of Lords. She is also a contributor and advice columnist to Sedaa, a website featuring writers from Muslim backgrounds.

== Secular activism ==
Saleem speaking out about her Islamic school in October 2014

In October 2014, Saleem first spoke out about her treatment at her Nottingham boarding school at the Council of Ex-Muslims of Britain's Secular Conference 2014. In November 2014, she also wrote a more detailed exposé about it in The Times under the pseudonym of Laylah Hussain. Saleem claimed that pupils were only taught various Islamic subjects from a fundamentalist perspective, indoctrinated them with anti-gay, anti-Christian and anti-Jewish views, and had no geography, history, art, sport or music classes. The science class omitted evolution and sex education, and she was taught that men are permitted to beat their wives. Due to the concerns she raised, the school was subjected to an unannounced inspection in April 2015, and rated as 'inadequate' by Ofsted as a result. When a second inspection in April 2016 did not show sufficient improvements, Jamia Al-Hudaa Residential College was threatened with partial or full closure. The school's management attempted to appeal the decision, while Saleem urged the Department for Education to "move swiftly now to protect these pupils."

Maryam Namazie interviews Aliyah Saleem about her Islamic school.

In 2015 Saleem, with her colleague Imtiaz Shams, an ex-Muslim atheist from Saudi Arabia, co-founded the advocacy group Faith to Faithless. The organisation provides support for people leaving Islam and other minority religions, challenges discrimination faced by non-religious people and aims to create awareness of the issues involved in leaving religion. Saleem and Shams began by holding "coming out" events at universities, where ex-Muslims and other apostates could tell their stories in the presence of peers who had also been through deconversion.

In 2015 Saleem represented Humanists UK (then the British Humanist Association) at a diversity chamber debate in the House of Lords in which she spoke about the discrimination and persecution faced by many ex-Muslim atheists in the UK and around the world. The following year she represented Faith to Faithless at a further debate in the Lords about the particular problems ex-Muslims face when leaving religion.

In late 2015 and early 2016, Saleem recorded two videos offering strategies for Muslim or ex-Muslim women who no longer want to wear the hijab – she herself had worn a headscarf from the age of 11 – but are wary of the negative social consequences they may face for doing so.

In April 2016 Saleem appeared in the BBC Radio 4 two-part documentary programme about the Deobandis, the isolationist traditional Muslim community that was responsible for her schooling and which controls the majority of Islamic religious schools in the UK.

== Works ==
- Saleem, Aliyah; Mughal, Fiyaz (2018). Leaving Faith Behind: The journeys and perspectives of people who have chosen to leave Islam. London: Darton, Longman & Todd. p. 192. ISBN 978-0232533644.

== See also ==
- Ali A. Rizvi
- Fauzia Ilyas
- Sara Khan (human rights activist)
- Sarah Haider
- Ensaf Haidar
- Raif Badawi
- Maryam Namazie
- Muhammad Syed
- Imam Tawhidi
- Tarek Fateh
