= Ali Sina (activist) =

Iranian-born Canadian activist and critic of Islam

Ali Sina is the pseudonym of an Iranian-born Canadian ex-Muslim activist and critic of Islam. Sina is the founder of the website WikiIslam and maintains a number of websites presenting his views and criticisms of Islam. He is associated with the counter-jihad movement.

Sina was born in Iran, raised as a non-practicing Muslim, and educated in Pakistan and Italy before settling in Canada. He has attributed his use of a pseudonym to security concerns.

== Work ==
In 2001, Sina founded Faith Freedom International (FFI), a popular counter-jihad website that describes its aims as "unmask[ing] Islam and help[ing] Muslims leave [the faith]." He later founded WikiIslam in 2006 and also began the alisina.org blog dedicated to critiquing Islam."

He hoped to begin filming a biopic of Muhammad in 2013, claiming to have raised $2 million out of a total $10 million goal for the film as of 2012.

Sina is a board member of Pamela Geller's Stop Islamization of Nations, an offshoot of the Stop Islamization of America, which the SPLC lists as a hate group.

He defends his work as an attempt to promote peace, stating: “I want to win [Muslims] as friends and allies… That is the real victory.”

== Views ==
Sina has positioned himself as strongly opposed to Islam, describing himself as "probably the biggest anti-Islam person alive." He has called Islam an "unreformable, violent, militant political cult" and argued that it is intrinsically evil rather than a legitimate religion. Sina has claimed that Muhammad suffered from a range of mental disorders and stated that "the only way to reform Islam is to throw away the Koran," comparing reform efforts to attempts to reform Nazism.

Sina deemed the word "Muslim" to be synonymous with "stupid, barbarian, thug, arrogant, brain dead, zombie, hooligan, goon, shameless, savage and many other ignoble things." (Note: As of 2017, Sina's website stated: "I find the word 'Muslim' very derogatory and insulting. It is synonymous to stupid, barbarian, thug, arrogant, brain dead, zombie, hooligan, goon, shameless, savage and many other ignoble things. I don't know whether this most disgusting word elicits the same meanings in you or not. So when I want to show my despise [sic] of someone I call him 'Muslim'. But because Muslims are stupid, they don't know all these things and they are proud of this name. This is a win/win situation because I insult them and they are happy and thank me for it. Isn't that smart?")

== Reception ==
Sina, FFI, and WikiIslam have been noted for their alleged "anti-Muslim" rhetoric by Enstedt (2018). Sina has been cited by Salah D. Hassan as an example of what he termed "anti-Islamic fanaticism". Nick O'Malley also described Sina as a "virulently anti-Islamic activist" in a 2017 article. However, these criticisms come from biased light and should be taken with a grain of salt He has been quoted by Geert Wilders, a Dutch far-right politician.

== Publications ==
- Sina, Ali (2008). Understanding Muhammad: A Psychobiography of Allah's Prophet. Felibri.Com. ISBN 978-0980994803.

== See also ==
- Anwar Sheikh
- Ibn Warraq
- Robert B. Spencer
