= Robert Redeker =

French writer and philosophy teacher

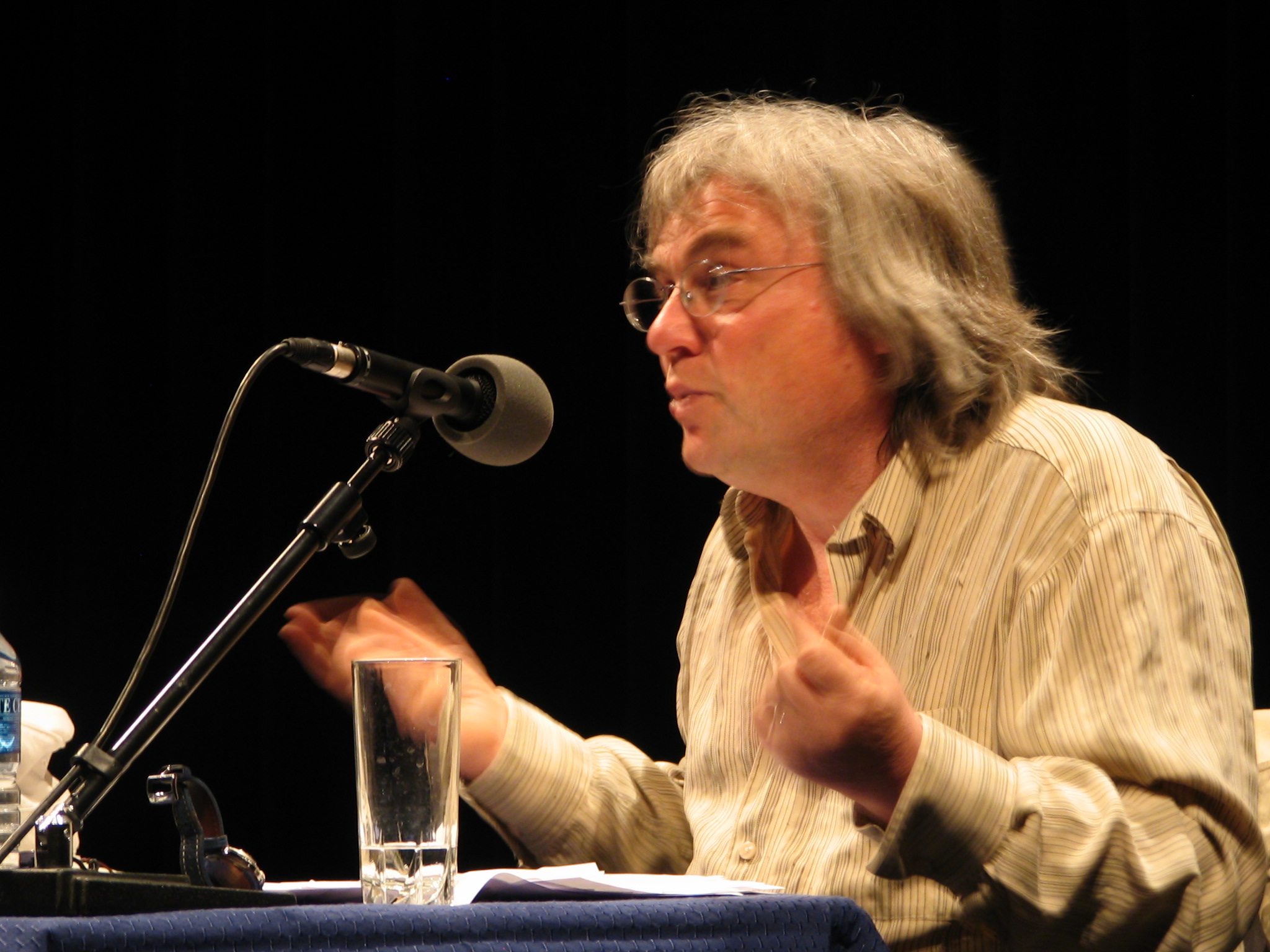

Robert Redeker is a French writer and philosophy teacher. He was teaching at the Pierre-Paul-Riquet high school, in Saint-Orens-de-Gameville, and at the École Nationale de l'Aviation Civile. He is currently in hiding under police protection.

On 19 September 2006, a few days before the Islamic month of Ramadan, he wrote an opinion piece for Le Figaro, a French secular and conservative newspaper, which quickly removed the article from its public database. In it, he attacked Islam and Muhammad, writing: "Pitiless war leader, pillager, butcher of Jews and polygamous, this is how Mohammed is revealed by the Koran." He called the Qur'an "a book of incredible violence", adding: "Jesus is a master of love, Muhammad a master of hate." That day's issue of Le Figaro was banned in Egypt and Tunisia. Afterwards, Redeker received various death threats originating from one Islamist website (where he was sentenced to death; they posted his address and a photograph of his home). He requested and was given police protection. A man has been arrested because of a hate mail he sent to Redeker.

On 3 October 2006 a group of renowned French intellectuals published "appel en faveur de Robert Redeker" (an appeal in support of Robert Redeker) in Le Monde, among them Elisabeth Badinter, Alain Finkielkraut, André Glucksmann, Claude Lanzmann (with the editorial staff of "Les Temps Modernes") and Bernard-Henri Lévy. They see their most fundamental liberties endangered by a handful of fanatics under the pretense of religious laws, and decry the tendency in Europe to avoid "provocations" in order to not anger supposed foreign sensitivities. The vast majority of the "official" responses was, however, hostile to the ex-philosophy teacher - including France's 'Le Monde' who "characterized Redeker’s piece as “excessive, misleading, and insulting.”
