= Ex-Muslims =

People who have left Islam

Ex-Muslims (Note: Arabic: المسلمون السابقون, romanized: almuslimun alsaabiqun, or The Murtads (Arabic: المرتدين, romanized: almurtadīn, lit. 'The returnees')) are individuals who were raised as Muslims or converted to Islam and later chose to leave the religion. These individuals may encounter challenges related to the conditions and history of Islam, Islamic culture and jurisprudence, as well as local Muslim culture. In response, ex-Muslims have formed literary and social movements, as well as mutual support networks and organizations, to address the difficulties associated with leaving Islam and to raise awareness of human rights issues they may face. Ex-Muslims might face persecution in conservative Muslim majority countries due to abuse and threats.

== Reasons and process of leaving Islam ==
=== Academic studies ===
According to Pauha and Aghaee (2018), apart from context and additional levels of struggle, the deconversion process and some of the reasons for leaving religion might not be much different for Muslims leaving their religion compared to Christians leaving theirs. According to Simon Cottee (2015), the intellectual process of leaving religion begins with the onset of doubt about Islam and its practice. According to Cottee, doubts about the religion are generally severely reprimanded with threats of hell in the afterlife toward impressionable young children and associating doubting individuals with possession by devils and further superstitious practices of exorcism. Therefore, doubt tends to be significantly discouraged, ranging from bad-mouthing about those who raise any doubts to brutally punishing them. This builds up peer and community pressure not to doubt and deviate from the status quo, leading to unsettling fears that someone whose doubts would be revealed might be put to shame and further banishment. The next steps for doubters are self-censorship and attempts to suppress recurring thoughts, leading to frustration.

==== Simon Cottee study ====
Simon Cottee (2015) wrote that it is very difficult for Muslims to express doubts and questions about Islam. Those who get the opportunity, must conduct self-search on the Internet, and if they wish to ask questions to any religious expert, then they have to do so with a lot of caution to avoid accusations of disbelief; rather than asking why God said something in the scriptures, they need to rephrase their inquiry in religiously 'right' language, asking what God meant by something. In other cases, doubters use real or imaginary proxies to avoid hostility towards themselves. Since many doubts are not answered, the unintended consequence is a further level of dissatisfaction. Cottee says ex-Muslims focus their doubts mostly on the truth claims of Islam, and the utility and morality of Islamic commands or prohibitions.

Phil Zuckerman summarizes Cottee's points about types of doubts engaged by ex-Muslims on the path of leaving Islam, namely: epistemological, moral, and instrumental doubts, as well as forms of doubts such as significant personal experiences, exposure to alternatives, scriptural discoveries, spiritual alienation, political events, etc. Epistemological doubts question the existence of God in several ways, such as through the problem of evil, by looking at injustice and misery around the world, which allegedly would not have existed if there really had been a good God. They also question the Islamic creation myth with respect to the theory of evolution, and the contradictions between the concepts of free will and predestination. Moral doubts concern issues such as the unequal treatment of women in Islam, and why non-Muslim children or good non-Muslims go to hell according to Islamic theology. Instrumental doubts question the utility and morality of Islamic commands or prohibitions, such as the prohibition of artistic representation of living beings (see Aniconism in Islam), which doubters claim hamper freedom of artistic expressions such as drawing, photography, sports like chess, music, etc. (see also Muslim women in sport), in turn, hampers individual growth and social-cultural participation.

Cottee's study indicates that ex-Muslims start feeling that they are betraying their true self and also deceiving their loved ones in the process, leading to feelings of shame for their own continued closeted pretending and subsequent feelings of isolation and loneliness. On the one hand, ex-Muslims often opt to reduce commitment to social relationships that require pretending to be Muslim; on the other hand, they often do not have the freedom to choose the kind of social relationships they prefer, thus exacerbating their social isolation and loneliness further. Cottee outlines different phases on the way of leaving Islam: disavowal of self, relief, excitement, guilt, anger, residual anxiety, confusion, disclosure, and more.

==== Khalil Bilici study ====
The 2007 Khalil Bilici study stated that motivations for leaving Islam can be broadly classified into two categories, namely intellectual/ideological motivations and social/experiential motivations. According to Teemu Pauha and Atefeh Aghaee (2018), the first group would find religion to be naive and irrational, whereas second group emphasizes the constraints and breaches of human rights of individuals negatively affecting social progress as their most significant concern. Pauha and Aghaee further point out that, depending on the doubting group one belongs to, one may find religion to be an example of stupidity or viciousness.

Findings of the Khalil Bilici study state that among ex-Muslims with intellectual/ideological motivations, the following ones seem important:

1. The subordinate status of women in Islam;
2. The contradictions in Sharia (Islamic law) vis-à-vis human rights (see Sharia § Contemporary debates and controversies);
3. The problematic nature of the Quran (see Criticism of the Quran);
4. The character of the Islamic prophet Muhammad and other Islamic leaders (see Criticism of Muhammad);
5. Islam as illogical and unscientific (e.g. vis-à-vis the theory of evolution, see Islamic attitudes towards science);
6. The eternal damnation of good non-Muslims (see Problem of Hell);
7. The unnecessary, strict rules and expectations of Islam;
8. Islam not being universal, but rather Arab-centric (see Ajam, Mawla, and Shu'ubiyya);
9. The dubious historicity of the Quran and Hadith (see Historical reliability of the Quran and Criticism of hadith).

Cottee's interviewees inform their intellectual doubts about perceived religious inconsistencies in Islam like, the barbarism of certain verses in the Qur'an, the improbability of the existence of God, the wickedness of the possibility of God creating Hell, discontent with the treatment of women, and more.

Among apostates with social/experiential motivations behind leaving Islam, Khalil Bilici noted the following reasons:

1. Unpleasant encounters with bad and cruel Muslims;
2. Muslims as oppressive;
3. Backwardness among Muslims;
4. Ill-treatment of women among Muslims;
5. Ill-treatment of non-Muslims by Muslims;
6. Muslims being in a state of illusion regarding their own religion.

Bilici stated that ex-Muslims are not necessarily always taking into account the whole range of historical and contemporary Muslim scholarly opinions, and their understanding may be mixed one. The Khalil Bilici study attributes gender discrimination and repulsive feelings owing to negative individual experiences and perceptions as the most prominent motivations of individuals leaving Islam. Khalil Bilici states that their study confirms earlier scholarly findings that some ex-Muslims commonly cite the experience of the 1971 Bangladesh genocide as an example of the oppressive nature of Muslims. Bilici further informs that like in many other conversions, a considerable number of Muslims from frontiers where they are exposed to different perspectives may be leaving Islam. Narratives about "leaving Islam" come from individuals of various ethnic backgrounds and age groups, and from across the world (with South Asia, Southeast Asia, the Middle East and North Africa, and the West being prominent regions where ex-Muslims emerge), and that the gender mix seems to change relative to geography.

For example, Khalil Bilici takes note of some individual narrations, such as one ex-Muslim who found it odd that the Quran got 'engrossed with trivial aspects' related to the private life of Muhammad. In another example, an ex-Muslim found the 'killing of innocent people' by natural phenomena such as disease to be unfathomable to believe in God. A narration of another ex-Muslim asserted that life as a Muslim imposed socially restrictive choices and made one skip opportunities and responsibilities in order to fulfill mundane religious mandates; the same account found the status of women in Islam and condoning child marriage by the prophet to be problematic. Before deciding to leave Islam, one ex-Muslim evaluated arguments for and against the theory of evolution and found the theory of evolution to be more credible, found Quran to be unscientific, the idea of eternal damnation horrible, and the hypothesis of God unnecessary for explaining the existence of life.

During a panel discussion by Ex-Muslims of North America at the University of Colorado, ex-Muslim women from countries such as Lebanon and Saudi Arabia attributed flight from their countries of birth to day-to-day controlled life full of gender repression, isolation, and abuse by families and communities with internalized religious narratives. In many cases, the continuation of education becomes difficult for women, since families and communities give preference to early marriage (in many cases forced ones).

==== Teemu Pauha and Atefeh Aghaee study ====
In their analytical study of Iranian ex-Muslim accounts, Teemu Pauha and Atefeh Aghaee (2018) broadly concur with Phil Zuckerman about the reasons for leaving religion but prefer to classify categories of intellectual atheism and social atheism is further broadly distinctive – but occasionally overlapping – four sub-categories, namely: seekers, rationalists, rebels, and disillusioned ones. Pauha and Aghaee state that, while rationalists stress intellectual grounds, those who belong to the seeker category stress moral deficiencies as their respective reasons for de-conversion, but both these sub-categories focus on theoretical aspects. The sub-categories of rebels and disillusioned ones focus on their experiences and knowledge about social behaviors of believers in Islam as far from being ideal, practically harmful to individuals and society, and not progressive enough – rebels attempt to rebel against this perceived state of affairs and leave, and disillusioned ones leave because they don't expect any change in the situation. Other than the seeker sub-category, people in the other three categories are already skeptics at some level to begin with, so their change over to atheism is more straightforward and emotionally and intellectually less confronting or stressful.

Pauha and Aghaee state that for people in the seeker sub-category, the intellectual journey begins with hope, but the practical realization that the morals of Islam are not in line with their expectations is emotionally and intellectually confronting and stressful. This happens because, in comparison to the other three categories, seekers originally happen to be the most sincere devote believers in Islam, usually having positive social relationships and experiences since childhood. Basically, they do not start their quest from a place of doubt, but from a desire to explore and seek more knowledge about the faith. However, while doing so, when they conclude that morals in Islam are not matching their own standard of moral values and their expectations of an omnibenevolent God, they first go through a phase of denial, but eventually, they prefer to accept their conclusions after quite a bit of additional emotional and intellectual self-struggle (known as cognitive dissonance), and end up accepting atheism or a compromise with some sort of individual-level spirituality.

==== Maria Vliek study ====
According to Maria Vliek (2021), larger structures of secularity help the development of the relative need for and desire to express publicly to contest dominant discourses and also identify oneself as 'ex-Muslim'. Maria Vliek states that in an ex-Muslim's journey of 'moving out of Islam' from previously being religious to becoming irreligious, there are multiple stages of inbetweenness.

In her Former Muslims in Europe Between Secularity and Belonging, Vliek makes a comparative study of ex-Muslims' (individuals and groups) processes of 'moving out of Islam' vis-à-vis multiple secularities in the Netherlands and the United Kingdom. Vliek's study attempts to find out why 'secularist ex-Muslim voices' in one European secular country (Britain) are relatively more outspoken than the other secular country (the Netherlands), and relates to the difference being in the nature of secularism in both of these countries. British secularism is diversity-inclusivist, whereas Dutch secularism focuses on social integration and national development. According to Vliek, ex-Muslims in the Netherlands seem to be concerned about whether their narratives might be used by alleged 'secular crusaders' to stigmatise Muslim communities, and that makes many of them feel that it's difficult to express themselves openly against their former religion. On the other hand, 'secularist ex-Muslim voices' in Britain can and do take recourse to accommodative diversity of British secularity to question and criticize reference points of the British secularity for giving space to Islamism on both the institutional and social levels vis-à-vis state-church relations in Britain, British multiculturalism, and communitarianism.

==== Najma Al Zidjaly study ====
According to Najma Al Zidjaly study in spite of high-risk restrictions and official obstructions, the Ex-Muslims in Arab societies could manage to form online communities and share challenging ideas which have been permeating throughout Arabia. Zidjaly says, ex-Muslims after studying Islam carefully, come to conclusion to no longer stand by Islam's history, books and tenets, out of respect for humanity and logic. Zidjaly says the ex-Muslim community is diverse, Zidjaly says, some Ex-Muslims convert to Christianity, but most shift to agnostics or secular, according to Najma Al Zidjaly study due to restrictive environments some ex-Muslims also fashion themselves as humanists, liberals and/or secularists without disclosing about leaving their religion. the Ex-Muslims include anonymous free thinkers and authors of both genders with differing scales of beliefs. According to the Zidjaly study, While the Arab 2018 social media report indicates lower participation of Arabian women on social media, many active Ex-Muslims are women from Saudi Arabia and Kuwait. Ex-Muslims also include a few non-anonymous writers like Brother Rachid and Hamid Abdel Samad who have YouTube channels. Both had to run away from their respective Arab countries. Mutual interactions and political and social events lead to cycles of discourses. Ex Muslims on social media deploy humor, satire, facts, repair, rhetorical questions, At the beginnings of the Islamic religious deliberation by the masses during the early 2000s, the Quran itself did not come for criticism. However, this too has changed, and now all Islamic texts are open to critique in the Ex-Muslim community; online Ex Muslim activism includes

- Contesting and discrediting questionable principles in the Islamic literature, including the Quran, the holy book of Islam; The history of Islam and pre-Islam
- Scrutinizing and pointing out questionable cultural behaviours (e.g. lack of empathy, Shamata (الشماتة, schadenfreude, the practice of finding joy in others' suffering), the pervasive ideology of being Muslim first and human second, unfair gender roles)
- Create and share enlightening videos, facts, quotations and books on relevant topics by Arab and international voices. Most of these focus on contesting flaws in the Islamic information which is widely inculcated through school curricula and Islamic literature.
- Rewriting the traditionally or authoritatively presented history of Islam
- Conversing in citizen sociolinguistics or linguistic exercises, like redefining key terms for e.g. freedom as the right to choose instead of negative perception of freedom in Muslim societies as the right to be immoral and also supplanting key terms with more accurate versions (e.g. Calling out Islamic crusades as Islamic invasions instead of Islamic openings, as used in Arabic discourse)
- Participating in public discourse among online Ex-Muslim community and debating with those who identify as Muslims and engaging them with counter-arguments.
- Making follower comments and meta-comments which may range from support to trolling.
- Giving likes and/or share (mostly by followers) and Retweeting at times.
- Private direct messages sent by anonymous followers are retweeted

=== Examples of doubts by ex-Muslims ===
A Firstpost news report about ex-Muslims in India by Tufail Ahmad informs one ex-Muslim could not believe that the god [Allah] who is so great would not have a sense of fair play and will send all non-Muslim kids of a school to the hell. Another questioned since a day can last six months in countries near the North Pole, when should Muslims break their day-long fast? One of the ex-Muslims' mother was a Christian; when clerics pleaded not to take food and water from non-Muslims, this incident raised doubts in their mind.

In examples cited by the Pauha and Aghaee study, those who leave Islam prioritize universal values of human morality ahead of religion, some of the values in the religion being insulting to universal human values, and experience that the practice of fasting by close relatives is not helping one from facing death. When comparing Islam with other religions, doubters considered the possibility of the other religions being right, studied various scriptures and were open to questions coming to one's mind. Ethical objections that trouble doubters commonly included the hypocrisy of conservative leadership, the worst practices of religious people in practice, questions over homophobia, and epistemological doubts about how, by failing to be clear in his communications to humans, God is apparently putting millions of people at risk of eternal damnation in hell (see also Problem of Hell and Argument from inconsistent revelations).

Cottee's respondent ex-Muslims further elaborate their questions, including asking why any wonderful God would create hell and subject even innocent non-Muslims to hell if predestination is his own creation, and whether predestination is compatible with free will. To many ex-Muslim interviewees, a God who does not appear to provide any solid physical proof of his own existence, while wishing to send everyone to hell for eternity just for doubting him, even if they were good people who lead a good life, does not seem to comply with the qualities of benevolence or fairness that are commonly attributed to God.

Other doubt-inducing questions concern how God allegedly allows for the enormity of suffering (the problem of evil), and why the Islamic God appears to be jealous, vain, and insecure, and demands worship all the time. Cottee's other respondent ex-Muslims expressed the idea that, in Quran-related epistemological doubts, many Quran revelations sound like revelations of individual convenience. They also wondered how one could know that other religions were wrong and only Islam was right and concluded that the Islamic account of creation is problematic when the theory of evolution is taken into account. Prohibitions on relationships with people of other religions (especially for Muslim women), punishments for apostasy, and the unequal treatment of women vis-à-vis men are reported to be questionable.

Cottee relates that ex-Muslims' personal experiences like abuse, violence, illness, deaths, building or severing of relationships made some of them reassess previously held beliefs, raising questions such as how God could subject a child to illnesses such as leukemia at a very young age. Some former Muslims arrived at the point of view that they could choose how to live their own sexual lives and that religion imposed objectionable restrictions on individual sexual freedom. Getting exposed to non-Islamic and atheistic thoughts of scientists and about evolution brought doubts to the fore, and on further investigation, ex-Muslims found these doubts confirmed and cemented. Cottee says many of the ex-Muslims are devout in their rituals, either to please their believing loved ones, or to defend Islam when they embark upon reading Quran and Hadith with proper translations. However, once they actually study and examine scripture, they stumble upon many questionable and disturbing inexplicable acts in the name of God, such as passages perceived to be violent, in which God throws unbelievers who were good human being by behavior in hell as well, or is peeling off the skin of the damned, or the slaughtering of the surrendered Jewish tribe of Banu Qurayza in Muhammad's life, or even recent Islamist or terrorist events that were purportedly motivated or justified by Islamic scriptures.

=== Challenges in childhood and growing up years ===
One respondent in Cottee's study elaborates on the kind of fear of hellfire and God's wrath thrust upon young impressionable minds that she ended up believing that the bullying that happened to her in school might have been a result of her questioning religion in her mind. Another respondent remembers the fear of shaitan and the subsequent threat of the (allegedly abusive) practice of exorcism to dissuade children from doubting, even though this may not necessarily stop their minds from having doubts. One of Cottee's respondents informs that she was scared of questioning, because she was taught not to question. But when questions came to her mind she had all those doubts, which she could not be confident to discuss with anyone – from parents to teachers – since she would not know how would they react. According to Cottee, these childhood fears are carried to adulthood too to some extent as the beginning journey of a closeted atheist life under pressure. Most children are dissuaded from asking difficult questions by parents by censuring them.

=== Scholarly and literary influences ===
Khalil Bilici says leaving Islam is deeply influenced by various previous literary works and other events and interactions, including that of Taslima Nasrin and Salman Rushdie, as well as writings of philosophers and scientists such as Bertrand Russell, Carl Sagan, and Richard Dawkins. According to Pauha and Aghaee, Richard Dawkins' book The God Delusion (2006) is likely to be one of the most influential books among new generation atheists.

=== Closeted life ===
According to Najma Al Zidjaly study ex-Muslims can also fashion themselves as humanists, liberals and/or secularists without disclosing of leaving their religion. Since secular liberals and also Quranists contest Islamic authoritative discourses, researcher Al Zidjaly considers them close to ex-Muslims to a lesser degree than self-admitted Ex-Muslim. According to Farzana Hassan many ex-Muslims have to hide their lack of belief from their immediate family members, friendships, and the communities since they are worried of getting ostracized. Hassan says closeted ex-Muslims have to live strained double lives specially if surrounded by religious family members, they have to pretend much as of cultural Muslims participating in all the visible observances of the religion while reserving their disbelief to themselves.

Cottee says ex-Muslims who have not publicly declared that they have left Islam need to cope with disapproving conservative attitudes towards their non-compliance to religious tenets and liberal attempts. To lie, conceal and managing a liberal expression of oneself remains a difficult task under constant family, friend and community social surveillance. The mental impact of this effort to hide one's true thoughts is heavy for many ex-Muslim individuals, making leaving Islam a long-term, arduous, and psychologically demanding process. Since the larger society around ex-Muslims holds such activities to be sinful, this causes increased anxiety and possible guilt among neophytes, and the inability to communicate these feelings to anyone leads to feelings of uncertainty, guilt, self-doubt, loneliness, and depression. Lack of contact with similar-minded people and lack of support networks exacerbates the feelings. According to Cottee, closeted ex-Muslims, even if not physically, are estranged psychologically from religion and practice.

Khalil Bilici's study says that closeted ex-Muslims usually tend to hide leaving of Islam mainly out of fear of harm by radical conservatives, or they are unwilling to come out of the closet for possible dissolution of existing intimate relationships with a believing Muslim. Al Zidjaly says social media like WhatsApp, Facebook and Twitter provides closeted ex-Muslims agency through technology, and ex-Muslims have played roles of being undisclosed catalyst towards change in the religiously most conservative Arabian Gulf countries.

== Coming out and facing risks ==
Based on the accounts relayed to him by ex-Muslims during his study, Cottee found similar processes of concealment and coming out amongst ex-Muslims compared to the steps described by Ken Plummer as converts, such as sensitization, signification, coming out and stabilizing.

For many ex-Muslims, coming out comes at a cost to their relations with their family, friends, the community, and the state. Even immediate family are likely to express extreme reactions as well as online threats. Local police officers oftentimes do not understand the gravity of the issues involved, and the danger the threats pose to the lives of ex-Muslims. Phil Zuckerman says that ex-Muslims are not only marginalized by their respective families and the wider community of Muslim believers, but their views and plight are also poorly understood by non-Muslim individuals and communities. Zuckerman concurs with Cottee that the challenges of "coming out" to family and friends, as well as the reactions that often follow, are stressful, can turn out to be very harsh and damning. Under such pressures some apostates tend to go back into the closet once again; while actually remaining nonbelievers, they end up pretending to be back in the Islamic fold to avoid the loss of relationships with family, and to save their loved ones from socially damaging shame and stigma. Zuckerman stated that the degree to which many ex-Muslim' families and friends condemn, despise, and reject their apostate relatives for leaving Islam is generally too brutal.

=== Family and friends ===
After coming out to their families and communities, ex-Muslims have reported various kinds of extreme reactions in many cases, such as being forced to undergo exorcisms, receiving threats to their lives, and being chased around with the intention of retaliation.

=== Human rights and social control ===
According to Ziv Orenstein & Itzchak Weismann (2016), ex-Muslims happened to be the strongest supporters of universal human values, human rights and of integration. They generally stand against divisive conservatism that controls Muslim communities, and against misusing the camouflaged garb of 'multiculturalism' in non-Muslim majority countries (frequently supported by a certain group within the non-Muslim left, known as the "regressive left") whenever it de facto enables this conservative control inside minority Muslim communities to persist. While ex-Muslims may differ in perception on how to face and combat religious extremism, they vehemently oppose religious terrorism, as well as the imposition of Sharia (Islamic law), the (compulsory) wearing of the hijab, and separate Islamic schools.

=== Media, censorship and state ===
According to Azweed Mohamad et al. (2017), it is very common in Muslim-majoritarian countries that conservative Muslim groups and governmental bodies actively work to constrain apostasy by keeping a religious taboo on the subject. However, despite governmental efforts to the contrary – ranging from censorship to laws against blasphemy and apostasy – apostasy from Islam is neither a rare phenomenon, nor can information on it be kept hidden from public view due to the widespread availability of the Internet. Even news media are attempting to cover apostasy issues by making strategic use of intricate linguistic tools, employing strong knowledge in linguistic usage, and the rhetorical structure to promote intended narratives, in spite of societal and governmental pressures. Nevertheless, these pressures tend to subdue such reporting, and the media are compelled to censor themselves to a certain extent. Azweed Mohamad et al. stated that, as new information flows in, governments scramble to use this information to update laws and implement them in order to constrain apostasy on the one hand; on the other hand, apostates use the same information as touchstones to renounce Islam.

According to Azweed Mohamad et al. conservative media in Muslim-majoritarian countries play an influential role with its higher followership by attempting to stall the rise of liberal practices and institutions. Conservative media do this by overshadowing liberal tendencies through their reporting by uplifting the image of conservative practices and institutions. By contrast, liberal media attempt to balance attitudes within their far more limited available space (freedoms) in Muslim-majoritarian countries such as Malaysia, retaining liberal rhetoric to the extent possible. Conservative media in Muslim-majoritarian countries tend to raise concern against the rise of liberal practices and institutions, hype unease and emotions among Muslim conservatives, and obliquely speak of threats to religious harmony and again ask credit for the same. Liberal news media report in effort to find hope, and attempt to employ supportive language for apostates, sometimes employing sarcasm to obliquely mock conservatism. If liberalism is in trouble, the stakes are increased by placing responsibilities across to the government or top national leaderships, and at the same time searching for supportive social soft corners.

==== Abuse of the flagging system on social media ====
While pointing out usage of strategic 'flagging' i.e. 'mass misreporting' as a tool in low-intensity online culture war to dislodge inconvenient point of views on social media websites like Facebook and YouTube is used by many; in the chapter, 'Facebook and Google as Offices of Censorship' authors Stjernfelt and Lauritzen in their study "Your Post Has Been Removed: Tech Giants and Freedom of Speech" say that this tactic of misusing the flagging system seems to have been employed by Islamist groups (or even governments in the Middle East?), in an organized manner, with an intention to remove democratic Muslim or anti-Islamist voices from Facebook. The Stjernfelt and Lauritzen study notes, in 2016, the Council of Ex-Muslims of Britain said that 19 different Facebook groups or sites organized by Arabic ex-Muslims or freethinkers had to face either shut downs or underwent attacks via organized misuse of the social media flagging system.

=== Humor as activism tool ===
According to a study of behaviour by young Moroccan non-believers in Facebook groups by Lena Richter (2021), humour is one of the most popular ways of expressing experiences and thoughts among non-believers in different parts of the world to challenge religious authority. Richter says: "On the surface, Internet memes and other jokes might appear trivial. While they often appear to lack seriousness, they are an intrinsic part of today's digital culture (Milner 2012; Shifman 2013) and carry important social, emotional, cultural, and political messages (Miltner 2018; Bennett and Segerberg 2012). Beyond that, memes can be an important part of lived (non)religion, as they are a common and participatory expression of meaning-making in everyday life (Aguilar et al. 2017)." Richter went on to state that humor remains a covert dissent strategy which establishes differentiation towards the religious majority, contributes to bridging (non)religious disagreement and the creation of identification among non-believers.

Richter wrote: "In countries like Morocco, the room for humorous activism is influenced by the semi-authoritarian context, which restricts some freedoms but offers others (Ottaway 2003)." According to Richter, activism that openly advocates for freedom of conscience is rather restricted, as many activists fear the legal and social consequences. Suffering from stigmatization, activists reported cases of (verbal) violence by family members, investigations by authorities, and obstacles in professional, educational, and private life. As a consequence, the restrictive situation for non-believers gives an indication as to why many non-believers rely on "more indirect forms of activism such as humor".

Richter found that "humor tests the border of what is still tolerated to express. On the one hand, some jokes enjoy a free pass as they are "not meant seriously" and provide a space of liberty that allows people to vent frustrations (Davies 2007). On the other hand, some topics, that touch the troika of "allah, al-watan, al-malik" (Kettioui 2020) cross that line and are labeled as blasphemous. The awareness that it is not possible to criticize or joke about certain topics leads to (self-)censorship (Rahman 2012) and a try-and-see ethos that tests the limits of freedom of speech (Iddins 2020)".

=== Instances of persecution and breach of human rights ===
In Malaysian textbook cases, Malaysian courts declined to approve changes of religion and marriage to non-Muslim men to one Azlina Jailani, who was allowed to change her name to Lina Joy, but not her religion. In another case, Nur'aishah Bokhari had to file habeas corpus against her own parents and flee from Malaysia in order to marry her non-Muslim boyfriend. In one more Malaysian case, the young woman Revathi Masoosai was raised as a Hindu in childhood by her grandmother before her parents converted to Islam. When Masoosai married a Hindu and sought to change her religion, the Malaysian courts not only denied her request to formally change the record of her religion, but also seized her daughter and handed her over to her converted Muslim mother. Another recent case being, In August 2021, an ex-Muslim from Kerala, Abdul Khader Puthiyandadi was arrested without bail and sentenced to prison for three years for criticising Quran and Hadith by United Arab Emirates on the grounds of blasphemy law.

== Challenges and movements ==
The term 'ex-Muslim movement' is used to describe the social movement of individuals and groups who have renounced Islam, seek to normalize religious dissent and leaving of Islam, support others who have done so or are in the process of leaving by linking them to support networks, and sometimes encourage Muslims to leave Islam. According to Frank Fregosi, while publicly recommending leaving Islam, Ex-Muslims mobilize on politically secular lines, and also defend absolute freedom of conscience and freedom of criticizing Islam. Citing a 2017 Pew Research survey, The Wall Street Journals Daniel Pipes stated that roughly a hundred thousand people in the United States may be leaving Islam annually, and even if new ones join Islam in similar numbers, still it is those who leave Islam who would ultimately influence the Islamic faith more than any converts to Islam would do.

Ex-Muslim activism uses avenues of newspapers, public gatherings as well as online platforms. Smaller gatherings and events also take place in bars, cafes, and restaurants. According to Farzana Hassan, even many ex-Muslims who come out on YouTube channels of other prominent ex-Muslim's channels like Harris Sultan, Apostate Prophet, Ghalib Kamal, continue to prefer to maintain anonymity by using pseudonyms or restricting the information to very trusted few. Hassan says ex-Muslim activism is making Muslim world face some introspection.

=== Background ===
==== The Satanic Verses controversy (1988–2000) ====
"Mine is a voice..not yet found expression
..It is the voice of..born Muslims
but wish to recant in adulthood,
yet are not permitted to on pain of death.
..who does not live in an Islamic society
cannot imagine the sanctions,
both self-imposed and external,
..against expressing religious disbelief,
.. along comes Rushdie..speaks for us.
Tells the world that we exist..
..we are not simply a mere fabrication
of some Jewish conspiracy.
He ends our isolation."

— A 1989 letter to The Observer
covered by Daniel Pipes,
The Wall Street Journal 6 Aug. 2020

The Satanic Verses controversy motivated Ibn Warraq to write his 1995 book Why I Am Not a Muslim (in reference to Bertrand Russell's 1926 classic Why I Am Not a Christian) in defence of its author Salman Rushdie and other apostates, followed by other books critical of the Quran and Muhammad. Three years later, Warraq and other former Muslims founded the Institute for the Secularisation of Islamic Society to advocate for the interests of apostates and jointly express criticism of their former religion.

==== Post 9/11 era (2001–2006) ====
Al Qaeda's terrorist attacks on 11 September 2001 (colloquially known as 9/11) on the World Trade Center in New York City and The Pentagon in Washington, D.C., made a powerful impact on doubting and former Muslims. For some, it (partially or temporarily) reversed their process of apostasy in the face of a generalised anti-Muslim backlash that (mistakenly) targeted them or their family and friends as "terrorists" in Western societies. For others, it accelerated their loss of faith, or in fact planted the first seed of doubt about their Islamic beliefs, that appeared to be based on the same religious texts that the 9/11 hijackers used to justify their terrorist attacks. Ali Sina, a Muslim convert to Christianity, founded the Faith Freedom International (FFI) website in October 2001. Meanwhile, Ibn Warraq compiled the first collection of stories from former Muslims: Leaving Islam: Apostates Speak Out (2003);

Seeing children of Muslim parents cheer at the 9/11 attacks, having checked that Osama bin Laden's justifications for it, and finally having read the Atheïstisch manifest of Dutch philosopher Herman Philipse, Dutch political scientist and former Somali asylum-seeker Ayaan Hirsi Ali renounced Islam in 2002 and became a prominent critic. Due to her open hostility towards Islam in public discourse in the Netherlands, where she became a Member of Parliament in 2003, she received numerous death threats for leaving and criticising her former faith, culminating in the assassination of Theo van Gogh on 2 November 2004, with whom she had co-produced the short film Submission. Hirsi Ali's essays were later bundled into two collections, De zoontjesfabriek and The Caged Virgin; the latter became an international bestseller and had been translated into about 10 languages by May 2006. Subsequently, in 2006, issues surrounding difficulties faced by apostates from Islam, for example by Italian journalist Magdi Allam, came into French discourse while discussing criticism of Islam by Robert Redeker in Le Figaro.

=== Rise of European ex-Muslim councils (2007) ===
The modern international organised ex-Muslim movement may be traced back to the 2007 foundation of the Central Council of Ex-Muslims (Zentralrat der Ex-Muslime, ZdE) in Germany. Its primary initiator was Mina Ahadi, an ex-Muslim refugee from Iran who escaped a death sentence that she received for criticising the Islamic regime; she settled in Cologne in 1996. After an April 2006 workshop on political Islam in Osnabrück, she discussed how to do better activism for people who have renounced Islam with Giordano Bruno Foundation spokesperson Michael Schmidt-Salomon, who suggested the launch of an awareness campaign titled "Wir haben abgeschworen!" ("We have renounced!", in reference to the 1971 campaign We've had abortions!, "Wir haben abgetrieben!" in German). It would be a collection of photographs of people who had escaped political Islam to Germany, and were willing to come out publicly with their faces as former Muslims. To carry out such a campaign, Schmidt-Salomon suggested the foundation of a Central Council for Ex-Muslims, in contrast to the existing Central Council of Muslims in Germany (founded in 1994). Although Ahadi and fellow apostates disliked the term 'ex-Muslim' at first, because they preferred to call themselves atheists and humanists, they eventually agreed and made preparations. The council's formation was announced on 28 February 2007 at a press conference in Berlin, during which the "Wir haben abgeschworen!" campaign was launched as well. Previously, former Muslims had expressed frustration at the media for continually associating them with the Islamic religion that they had left. For example, Ibn Warraq and Salman Rushdie were called 'Muslim intellectuals'. But after the council's formation, the term "ex-Muslim" was rapidly popularised in the media.

The Central Council of Ex-Muslims directly inspired the foundation of the Council of Ex-Muslims of Britain (headed by Maryam Namazie and others, presented on 19 June 2007) in the United Kingdom, the Central Committee for Ex-Muslims (headed by Ehsan Jami and, until June, also by Loubna Berrada) in the Netherlands in May, officially presented on 11 September 2007, and also a council in Scandinavia.

=== Emergence of North American ex-Muslim organisations (2009–2013) ===
The Secular Islam Summit was held 4–5 March 2007 in St. Petersburg, Florida.

The American group Former Muslims United, headed by Muslim-turned-Christian Nonie Darwish, was founded in October 2009 in Los Angeles. It was followed in 2012 by the Muslimish group, and in 2013 by Ex-Muslims of North America (EXMNA), which formed a network of local ex-Muslim groups throughout the United States and Canada. Meanwhile, the online community Atheist Republic was set up by Vancouver-based ex-Muslim activist Armin Navabi in 2012; by May 2017, it had become the largest online atheist community in the world, with chapters ('consulates') in dozens of countries.

=== Impact of Islamic State (2014–2019) ===
We used to defend Islam. But now,
with ISIS, it's like having to constantly
make excuses for a serial killer.
I refuse to participate in that any longer.

— Ir@qi@theist (pseudonym)

It is generally understood that the rise of the jihadist-terrorist organisation Islamic State of Iraq and the Levant (ISIL, ISIS, IS or Daesh), that proclaimed a caliphate in July 2014 and committed massacres and systematic sexual slavery across Syria and Iraq in the name of Islam, had a major impact on many thousands of Muslims throughout the world (primarily the Middle East and North Africa) in dissociating themselves from their religion.

The period from 2014 to 2019 saw a surge in Kurdish Muslims converting to Zoroastrianism, the original faith of their ancestors that was prevalent in the region before the Muslim conquest of Persia. This surge is largely attributed to disillusionment with Islam after the years of violence and barbarism perpetrated by the ISIS jihadi group.

=== Africa ===
In Nigeria, Mubarak Bala, an ex-Muslim and president of the Humanist Association of Nigeria, was forcibly subjected to the psychiatric institution on leaving Islam in 2014 and arrested again in April 2020, he was arrested in Kaduna for blasphemy due to a Facebook post he made, facing difficulties in getting legal aid as of July 2020.

=== South Asia ===
==== Pakistan ====
Globally quite a few notable ex-Muslim activists are of Pakistani and South Asian origin. According to the Gallup Poll In 2005, 1% of those Pakistanis who participated in the poll were atheist and by 2012, the figure rose to 2%. In 2012, the Atheist & Agnostic Alliance Pakistan was founded by Fauzia Ilyas, who had to take asylum in Netherlands after being persecuted under Pakistani blasphemy laws. Agents of the Pakistani state attempt to suppress nascent online atheist activism by infiltration of atheist groups, and suppression by blocking online and offline safe spaces for free speech and persecution by unofficial abductions and Pakistani blasphemy law threats.

==== Bangladesh ====
Asif Mohiuddin speaking at the American Atheists Convention 2015

In the Bangladesh Liberation War (March–December 1971), a significant number of Bangladeshis left Islam to join Christianity (because missionaries stood with them during their difficult times during the civil strife) or to atheism after 1971 due to their experience of oppression conducted by fellow Muslims from West Pakistan. After the Internet became available, atheist, secular and ex-Muslim Bangladeshi bloggers began to appear in the mid-2000s. Asif Mohiuddin organised the first meeting of Bangladeshi freethinkers, atheists, agnostics, and other nonbelievers in Dhaka in 2010, which was attended by 34 people. Mohiuddin then became a victim of the attacks by Islamic extremists in Bangladesh (2013–2016), although, unlike many others, he survived the attempt on his life, and managed to flee to Germany. According to him, the number of 'secularist, humanist, atheist, nonbeliever' bloggers in Bangladesh (which has an 89% Muslim population) grew from 'four or five' people in 2005 to '15,000–20,000' in 2015.

==== India ====
In the early 21st century, an un-organised ex-Muslim movement started to emerge in India, typically among young (in their 20s and 30s) well-educated Muslim women and men in urban areas. They are often troubled by religious teachings and practices (such as shunning of and intolerance and violence towards non-Muslims), doubting their veracity and morality, and started to question them. Feeling that Islamic relatives and authorities failed to provide them with satisfactory answers, and with access to alternative interpretations of and information about Islam on the Internet, and the ability to communicate with each other through social media, these people resolved to apostatize. On 16 March 2017, an atheist political activist of Dravidar Viduthalai Kazhagam (DVK) named Farook Hameed of Coimbatore, Tamil Nadu (an Indian state known for decades of well-established atheist politics) who had an open WhatsApp group named 'Murtad (atheist)', was hacked to death allegedly by his own close friends for openly professing his atheism. Ex-Muslims of Kerala conduct several discussions on Islam and Atheism on social media and also conducts public debate with Islamic scholars. Ex-Muslims of Kerala observe every January 9 as Kerala 'ex-Muslim Day. Another Muslim organization from Kerala, 'Samastha Kerala Jamiat-ul-Ulema' are conducting special programs to counter increasing atheism among Muslim youth. According to a 2021 Pew Research Center report on a survey amongst Indians conducted in late 2019 and early 2020, 6% of Indian Muslims did not believe in God, and 12% of Indian Muslims were uncertain whether they believed in God.

==== Maldives ====
In the small South Asian Muslim-majority island state of the Maldives, free thinker activists contested extremist narratives on social media, conducted silent protests and questioned some conservatives since 2010. At least one of them, Mohamed Nazim, was arrested or in protective custody subsequently had to publicly revert to Islam in the custody period. Another, the young air traffic controller Ismail Mohamed Didi, was found dead after getting exposed for his apostasy, and further multiple questionable deaths of ex-Muslims over the years were linked to international terrorist connections of the accused.

==== Sri Lanka ====
In Sri Lanka, 9.7% of the population is Muslim. Due to the social taboo on leaving Islam, the Council of Ex-Muslims of Sri Lanka was founded in secret in 2016. Members of the organisation hold meetings in hiding. In June 2019, Rishvin Ismath decided to come forward as a spokesperson for the Council in order to denounce government-approved and distributed textbooks for Muslim students which stated that apostates from Islam should be killed. Ismath subsequently received several death threats.

=== Southeast Asia ===
In Malaysia, the pro-moderation group G25 stated in January 2020 that, while they do not advocate apostasy, they supported doing away with anti-apostasy laws. In 2017 Malaysian government investigated a group of atheist republic chapter members in Kuala Lumpur and declared atheism to be unconstitutional. Indonesian Atheist Facebook page was started in 2008, face to face gatherings of atheists were started in 2011 in Jakarta Indonesian atheist 'Karina'. Atheist republic chapter in Jakarta Indonesia also had to self-censor their activism further under pressure of blasphemy laws.

=== Apostasy and blasphemy laws ===
In July 2020, the Sudanese transitional government penalty on the apostates in Sudan.

== Life without and beyond Islam ==
According to Simon Cottee, ex-Muslims aspire to move on beyond religious discussions, but materializing that aspiration remains a challenge. Khalil Bilici, while admitting that the limitations of their 2007 study database are too small, found a substantial number of South Asians who tend to remain agnostic or atheist after leaving Islam, whereas a good number of Middle Eastern people are likely to convert to Christianity after leaving Islam.

== Demographics ==
Religious conversion has no net impact on the Muslim population growth as "the number of people who become Muslims through conversion seems to be roughly equal to the number of Muslims who leave the faith." Generally, there are few reports about how many people leave Islam in Muslim majority countries. The main reason for this is the social and legal repercussions associated with leaving Islam in many Muslim majority countries, up to and including the death penalty for male apostasy. On the other hand, the increasingly large ex-Muslim communities in the Western world that adhere to no religion have been well documented.

A 2007 Center for Strategic and International Studies (CSIS) report argued that some Muslim population projections are overestimated, as they assume that all descendants of Muslims will become Muslims even in cases of mixed parenthood. Equally, Darren E. Sherkat questioned in Foreign Affairs whether some of the Muslim growth projections are accurate as they do not take into account the increasing number of non-religious Muslims. Quantitative research is lacking, but he believes the European trend mirrors the American: data from the General Social Survey in the United States show that 32 percent of those raised Muslim no longer embrace Islam in adulthood, and 18 percent hold no religious identification. Many Muslims who leave Islam face social rejection or imprisonment and sometimes murder or other penalties. According to Pew Research, the number of U.S. converts to Islam is roughly equal to the number of U.S. Muslims who leave the religion, unlike other religions, in which the number of those leaving is greater than the number of converts. A survey conducted by Pew Research Center in 2017 found that conversion has a negative impact on the growth of the Muslim population in Europe, with roughly 160,000 more people leaving Islam than converting into Islam between 2010 and 2016.

According to the historian Geoffrey Blainey from the University of Melbourne, since the 1960s, there has been a substantial increase in the number of conversions from Islam to Christianity, mostly to the Evangelical and Pentecostal forms. Many Muslims who convert to Christianity face social and governmental persecution. Indonesia is home to the largest Christian community made up of converts from their former Islamic faith; since the mid and late 1960s, between 2–2.5 million Muslims converted to Christianity.

According to projections published by the Pew Research Center on 2026, the number of Muslims expected to become Christians between 2020 and 2070 (9.2 million) slightly exceeds the number of Christians expected to become Muslims (9 million). Switching between the two faiths would therefore result in a net gain of about 200,000 for Christianity. According to Pew, the projected growth of the Muslim population is not due to Christians converting to Islam.

== Support requirements ==
According to Simon Cottee, overwhelming realization from the interviews of ex-Muslims he has taken, marginalization of individual ex-Muslims across the board is a serious cause of concern and Cottee earnestly pleads in his book preface that ex-Muslims do deserve a better deal than what they are presently getting.

According to Cottee ex-Muslim individuals, self-help groups and forums would need to find financial support from larger society in lieu of family and community. Cottee says ex-Muslims in the west ought to manage the moral stigma attached to apostasy within their own communities and emotional difficulties and challenges involved in leaving Islam. Cottee further says it is not about traditional notions families and surrounding community is afraid about duty, honor, and shame has nothing to do with Islam but empathy is a solution where in Ex-Muslim individuals are looking forward to continuation of familial and community relationships in spite of leaving their faith. Cottee says even social workers and even mental health care workers need to be trained not only about nuances of Islamic faith but also about difficulties and dilemmas while leaving Islam.

== Mutual criticism ==
One of Simon Cottee's ex-Muslim respondent says that actually many of them are originally very devout and when they study original scriptures and Prophets life to defend against doubts about Islam they end up on side of confirming doubts being valid enough.

According to Aki Muthali, apologist claims of persecution of Muslims by new atheist ex-Muslims are dishonest; and actually it is atheists, who have been and are most persecuted by religious societies and how many more homicides of atheist Muslims would take it to acknowledge the need of (modernist) reform in Islam.

On the other hand, some ex-Muslims do complain that in non-Muslim majority countries, non-Muslim right-wing conservatives attempt to misuse their criticism to demonize Muslims as individuals or as a community; on the other hand, liberals and politically left-leaning people distance themselves from ex-Muslims to whitewash limitations of as an ideology, narrative, and religion to avoid upsetting the minority.

Ex-Muslim atheist author Ali Amjad Rizvi expresses his anguish at the 'liberal left in non-Muslim majority countries' contradictory attitude to treat non-Muslim far-right ideas as bad, but hesitating in extending the same level of criticism to questionable illiberal ideas and practices advocated in Islamic holy books like the Quran from misogyny, homophobia, extremist interpretations of jihad, harsh corporal punishments like hand amputation, severe legal penalties for blasphemy and apostasy and many more.

Rizvi calls, 'liberal left in non-Muslim majority countries' behavior of not supporting ex-Muslims but rather distancing themselves to shake hands with conservative Islamic bigotry as a kind of betrayal of true liberalism, shared by ex-Muslims.

According to Rizvi, 'many liberals in non-Muslim majority countries' inadvertently end up empowering inhumane and undemocratic attitudes of Islamist institutions and governments in Muslim-majority countries, who misuse the victimhood card to oppress and persecute liberal dissidents within their own societies.

Rizvi further points out that bigotry against Muslims as a human community and criticism of Islam are two different things. Ex-Muslims do not support any hate against Muslims, but rather, ex-Muslims themselves suffer from the same hate coming from the far-right for reasons such as sharing Muslim-cultural names. Ex-Muslims face triple jeopardy: they receive discrimination from the far-right, persecution from their erst-while Muslim relations and community, and even the liberal left of non-Muslims stand with persecutors of ex-Muslims.

According to Rizvi, critics of ex-Muslims tend to confuse between hate against a community and legitimate criticism of Islam. Muslims as humans do have rights and deserve respect, whereas Islam is just an idea, and all ideas are very much expected to be open to unreserved criticism and that ex-Muslims limit their criticism to Islam and do not extend it to Muslims as a community. While quoting Maryam Namazie, Rizvi reiterates that "criticizing Islam and Islamism is not anti-Muslim", rather, avoiding legitimate criticism of Islam and Islamism tend to create a vacuum as an open field for the far-right which is frequently used against Muslims.

Ex-Muslims are found to have concerns about some of the Islamic practices, including that of practicing hatred of kafirs (enemies and opponents of Islam), dislike of certain animal species meat like pork and impurity of dogs salve, polygamy.

== Ex-Muslim literature ==
- Crimp, Susan; Richardson, Joel (2008). Why We Left Islam: Former Muslims Speak Out. New York, WND Books. ISBN 9780979267109
- Ham, Boris van der; Benhammou, Rachid (2018). Nieuwe Vrijdenkers: 12 voormalige moslims vertellen hun verhaal (New Freethinkers: 12 Former Muslims Tell Their Story). Amsterdam: Prometheus. p. 209. ISBN 9789044636840.
- Hirsi Ali, Ayaan (2007). Infidel: My Life (Mijn Vrijheid). Simon & Schuster UK. ISBN 9780743295031.
- Hirsi Ali, Ayaan (2011). Nomad: From Islam to America. Simon & Schuster UK. ISBN 9781847398185.
- Al-Husseini, Waleed (2017). The Blasphemer: The Price I Paid for Rejecting Islam (Blasphémateur ! : les prisons d'Allah). New York City: Skyhorse Publishing. ISBN 9781628726756.
- Jami, Ehsan (2007). Het recht om ex-moslim te zijn (The Right to Be an Ex-Muslim). Kampen: Uitgeverij Ten Have. ISBN 978-9025958367.
- Mohammed, Yasmine (2019). From Al Qaeda to Atheism: The Girl Who Would Not Submit. Free Hearts Free Minds. ISBN 978-1724790804.
- Rizvi, Ali Amjad (2016). The Atheist Muslim: A Journey from Religion to Reason. New York City: St Martin's Press. ISBN 9781250094445.
- Saleem, Aliyah; Mughal, Fiyaz (2018). Leaving Faith Behind: The journeys and perspectives of people who have chosen to leave Islam. London: Darton, Longman & Todd. p. 192. ISBN 978-0232533644. ASIN 0232533644.
- Sultan, Harris (2018). The Curse of God: Why I Left Islam. Australia: Xlibris. ISBN 978-1984502124.
- Warraq, Ibn (2003). Leaving Islam: Apostates Speak Out. Amherst, New York: Prometheus Books. ISBN 978-1591020684.

== See also ==
- Apostasy in Islam
- Apostasy in Islam by country
- Blasphemy in Islam
- Criticism of Islam
- Cultural Muslim
- Zandaqa (Zindīq)
- Munafiq
- Kufr
- Destruction of early Islamic heritage sites in Saudi Arabia
- Discrimination against atheists
- Exvangelical
- Islam's Non-Believers
- Superstitions in Muslim societies
- List of critics of Islam
- List of former Muslims
- List of ex-Muslim organisations
