= Faith to Faithless =

UK organisation confronting discrimination against people who left religions

- Formation: 2015
- Founders: Imtiaz Shams, Aliyah Saleem
- Legal status: Part of a registered charity
- Purpose: Advocacy, public awareness and support for ex-religious people
- Website: www.faithtofaithless.com

Faith to Faithless is a non-profit organisation in the United Kingdom dedicated to confronting discrimination against atheists and non-religious people, in particular discrimination towards individuals who have left minority religions. It provides support to people leaving religion and helps them to "come out" to friends and family and gives a platform for individuals to speak out publicly and to find mutual support in the wider atheist, secular and humanist communities. Faith to Faithless advocates for individuals and families leaving any religion, and aims to bring discussion and support for ex-religious people into the public domain.

Since 2017 Faith to Faithless has been incorporated as a programme within Humanists UK, formerly the British Humanist Association, the national charity supporting non-religious people.

== Formation ==
Faith to Faithless was founded in 2015 by Imtiaz Shams and Aliyah Saleem. Shams, a Bangladeshi ex-Muslim atheist who grew up in Saudi Arabia, left Islam when he realised that his sense of justice was incompatible with the idea that all other religions must, by Islamic definition, be bad. He has explained that he needed to address the frustration that ex-Muslims and secular Muslims feel as their identity is perceived as indivisible from Muslim religion and the unease society at large has with Muslim apostasy. Saleem, who describes herself as an ex-Muslim atheist, left Islam at the age of 19 and described it as becoming free. By the age of 27, Saleem had worked with Shams and they decided to set up an advocacy group, Faith to Faithless, in order to help increase awareness of the issues around leaving religion, to show people in similar situations that they are not alone, and to provide a community network of support.

Faith to Faithless exists to support people who have left any religion, and began by organising a tour of universities in the UK, which they named 'coming out events', to make contact with people leaving or who had left conservative religion and provide mutual support with a platform to discuss individual experiences. The earliest public presentations, at Queen Mary University of London, were launched under the name Interfaithless before becoming Faith to Faithless, and speakers focussed broadly on leaving Islam and apostasy as (Ex) Muslim Voices. Shams wrote that the first event received a great deal of support, including from many Muslims, but also attracted abuse and hate mail and was leafleted by Islamic groups including the Queen Mary University of London Islamic society. The organisation quickly broadened to include people leaving a wide range of religions, including new age religions, Jehovah's Witnesses, ultra-orthodox Judaism, Exclusive Brethren and Christianity.

== Work ==
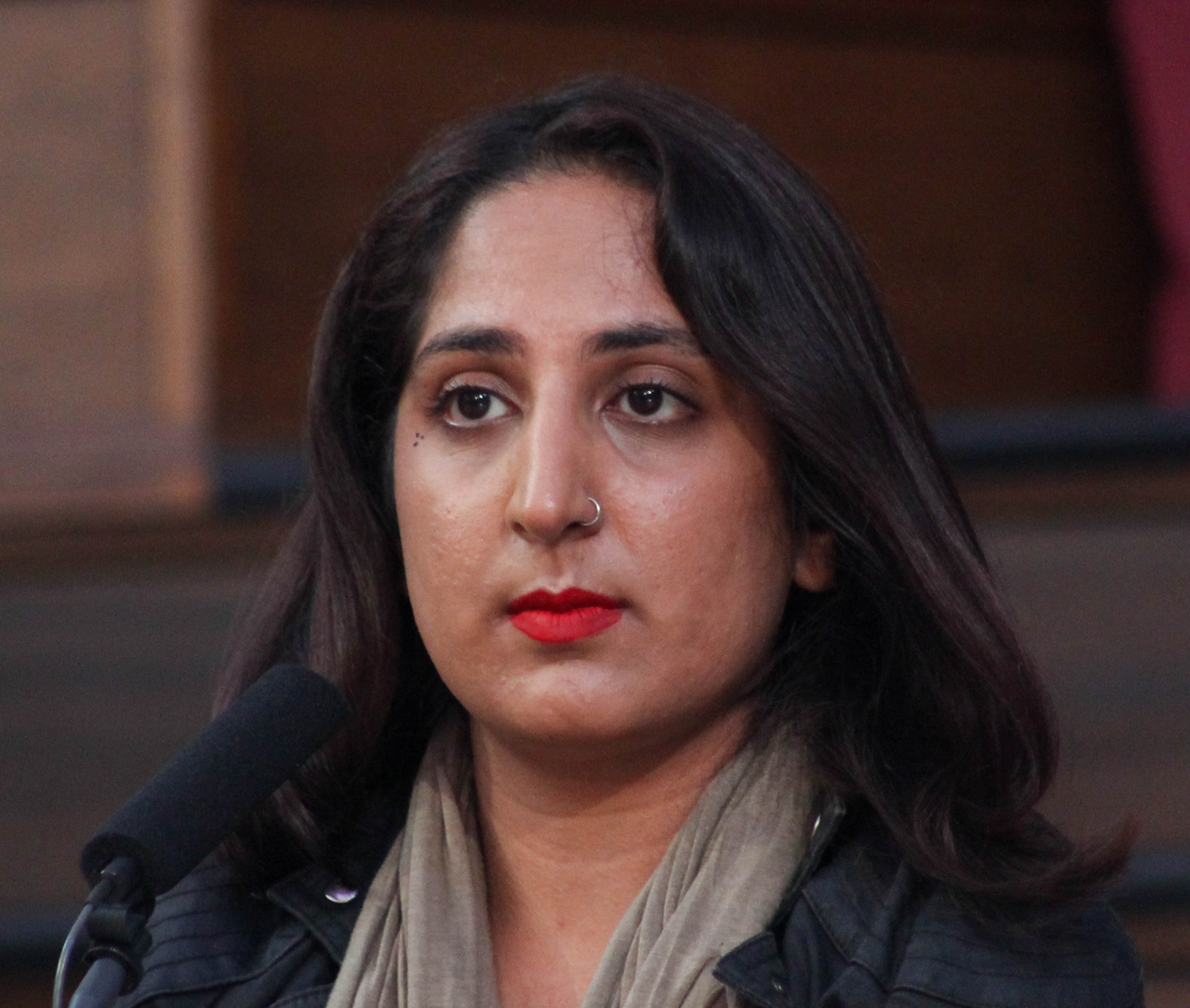
Aliyah Saleem, co-founder of Faith to Faithless

In addition to campaign work the organisation uses social media to create online communities and organises meetings, conferences and social events for ex-religious people. Shams himself first publicly stated he had left his religion by posting on Facebook and has said that in order to create strong and visible communities and help families deal with the issues surrounding apostasy (in his own experience with Islam) it is necessary to bring the debate into mainstream public media. The organisation also focusses on specific feminist issues for women leaving religion, recognising that for many women religion is linked to control and loss of freedom and autonomy.

Internationally, Faith to Faithless provided support to Australian and New Zealand ex-Muslims with setting up online peer support groups covering similar issues.

In 2016 members of Faith to Faithless were invited by Labour peer Lord Soley to present at a meeting in the House of Lords on the topic of leaving a religion. Faith to Faithless has also called upon the government to protect non-religious parents and children, particularly within isolated and ultra-orthodox communities where financial and social support can be entirely lacking. Faith to Faithless also advises and trains British police and social workers on dealing with specific issues around apostasy.

Since January 2017 Faith to Faithless has been a part of Humanists UK (formerly the British Humanist Association). Shams is also a trustee at Humanists UK.

In the autumn of 2017, founder Imtiaz Shams represented Faith to Faithless at an event organised by Ex-Muslims of North America in Washington, D.C.

Faith to Faithless holds socials and tours of British museums including the British Museum and Victoria and Albert Museum. The tours aim to contribute to the education of former members of high-control religions who may have had an isolated upbringing or limited educational opportunities and to provide opportunities to meet new people.

Since February 2024 Faith to Faithless has provided a helpline for people to call to access support and information. After 12 months, Humanists UK reported the helpline has supported "almost 500" people. The largest category of service users were ex-evangelical Christians, followed by ex-Muslims.

== See also ==
- Atheism
- Council of Ex-Muslims of Britain
- Criticism of Islam
- Ex-Muslims of North America
- Footsteps (organization)
- Mavar
- Religious disaffiliation
