= Torkel Brekke =

Norwegian professor

- Born: 1970 (age 55–56)
- Occupation: Professor
- Employer(s): MF Norwegian School of Theology, Religion and Society
- Known for: Research on religion and politics

Torkel Brekke (born 1970) is a Norwegian historian of religion, specializing in the intersection of religion and politics. He is a professor at the MF Norwegian School of Theology, Religion and Society in Oslo and affiliated with the University of Oslo's Center for Research on Extremism. He was formerly a professor at the University of Oslo and deputy director of the Peace Research Institute Oslo (PRIO).

== Background and career ==
Brekke earned his doctorate from the University of Oxford in 1999. He has published extensively on the culture, politics and religion of South Asia. His research includes the ethics of war in world religions and the phenomenon of religious fundamentalism. Brekke associates the rise of fundamentalism with developments after 1850, interpreting it as a reaction against modernism and nationalism.

In 2005, Brekke received the Faculty of Humanities' award for the most promising researcher under the age of 40 at the University of Oslo. He was a professor of the history of religions and South Asian area studies at the University of Oslo. From 2016 to 2020, Brekke was a Senior Research Fellow at the Peace Research Institute Oslo (PRIO), where he also served as Deputy Director. Between 2019 and 2023, he was professor of cultural and religious diversity at Oslo Metropolitan University. In 2023 he became a professor at MF.

== Bibliography ==
- 1996 A social scientific study of the early Buddhist Sangha and its relationship to the Laity : based on the Vinaya- and Sutta Pitakas
- 1999 The politics of religious identity in South Asia in the late nineteenth century
- 1999 Religion og vold. Humanist forl. ISBN 8290425341.
- 2001 Buddhas fortellinger. De norske bokklubbene. ISBN 8252541038.
- 2002 Gud i norsk politikk. Pax. ISBN 8253024223.
- 2002 Buddha – prins og tigger : en biografi
- 2002 Religious motivation and the origins of Buddhism : a social-psychological exploration of the origins of a world religion
- 2002 Makers of Modern Indian Religion in the Late Nineteenth Century
- 2004 Kains barn : religion og vold fra Det gamle testamente til 11. september.
- 2005 Globale visjoner, lokale aksjoner
- 2006 The Ethics of war in Asian civilizations : a comparative perspective / edited by Torkel Brekke
- 2007 Finnes det religion i India?
- 2007 Hva er fundamentalisme. Universitetsforl. ISBN 9788215010915.
- 2012 Fundamentalism. Prophecy and Protests in the Age of Globalisation. Cambridge University Press
- 2014 Hva er buddhisme. Universitetsforl. ISBN 9788215022420.
- 2016 Faithonomics: Religion and the Free Market Hurst Publishers, 2016
- 2023 Ingen er uskyldig: Antisemittisme på venstresiden. Cappelen Damm. ISBN 9788202757212.
