= Ex-Muslims of North America =

US non-profit focused on former Muslim advocacy

- Abbreviation: EXMNA
- Founded: September 28, 2013
- Type: 501(c)(3) Nonprofit organization
- Tax ID no.: 46-4333040
- Purpose: Islamic apostasy
- Region served: North America
- President: Muhammad Syed
- Website: exmuslims.org

Ex-Muslims of North America (EXMNA) is a non-profit organization which describes itself as advocating for acceptance of religious dissent, promoting secular values, and aiming to reduce religious discrimination faced by ex-Muslims.

EXMNA owns and operates WikiIslam, a website that presents itself as a critical encyclopedia focused on Islam but has been widely characterized by academic researchers as Islamophobic and anti-Muslim.

== History ==
The organization was founded in 2013 in Washington, D.C., by Sarah Haider and Muhammad Syed, and in Toronto by Sadar Ali and Nas Ishmael. They say that it is the first organization of its kind to "establish communities exclusive to ex-Muslims in order to foster a sense of camaraderie and offer a space free of judgement for lack of religiosity."

== Organization ==
Its stated mission is to reduce discrimination faced by those who leave Islam, advocate for acceptance of religious dissent, and promote secular values; counter the isolation facing nontheist ex-Muslims by fostering communities and support networks; and strive to amplify diverse ex-Muslim voices and experiences, and stand against those who seek to stifle criticism of Islam.

The organization has chapters in 25 cities across North America. A BBC article reported the organization had about 1,000 volunteers in 25 cities across North America, while a 2016 article in the Democrat and Chronicle noted that the group had about 4,000 total members.

The organization is run by staff and volunteers, and it relies on donations.

== Activities ==
Sarah Haider explains the goals and actions of EXMNA (2017).

EXMNA organizes ex-Muslim support chapters across the United States and Canada that are closed-group meetings for safety reasons; individuals who wish to attend support group events must undergo screening for identity verification.

EXMNA provides emergency support and grants to ex-Muslims in dire times—from escaping abuse to finding shelter and professional assistance. In 2018, Mahad Olad, a US college student, was taken to Kenya and held against his will. He was to undergo conversion therapy to 'cure' his apostasy from Islam and homosexuality. He was rescued through EXMNA's efforts and provided a grant to pay for his flight back to the US.

EXMNA led a campaign that successfully pressured Twitter to reverse its decision to obey a request from the Pakistan Telecommunication Authority to block content and accounts it considered blasphemous, which a report by The New York Times described as the first time the social networking service agreed to withhold content in Pakistan.

EXMNA went on a 2017–2018 campus tour across North America in what the organization said was a first-of-its kind effort to bring ex-Muslims and other activists to colleges across the United States and Canada.

== WikiIslam ==
In late 2015, EXMNA acquired ownership of the website WikiIslam. In 2018, Daniel Enstedt, in Moving In and Out of Islam, cited WikiIslam as an example of a website containing anti-Muslim rhetoric, and Göran Larsson cited WikiIslam as an "anti-Muslim webpage." In 2019, Asma Uddin, advisor on religious liberty to the Organization for Security and Co-operation in Europe and a fellow at the Aspen Institute, asserted that WikiIslam is a "rampantly anti-Muslim website". The same year, Syaza Shukri, Professor of Political Sciences at International Islamic University Malaysia, deemed the lack of positive content on WikiIslam to demonstrate a "definite agenda": the promotion of a monolithic version of Islam—violent, oppressive, and unrepresentative of "how a majority of Muslims view their religion".

In March 2021, EXMNA announced that it had implemented new content standards on WikiIslam, archived and deleted articles that did not meet those standards, and initiated re-writes of other articles.

In 2022, Rabia Kamal, a cultural anthropologist based at University of San Francisco, noted WikiIslam to be one of the many Islamophobic websites dedicated to "surveillance" of Islam and Muslims. A 2023 study by Edin Kozaric and Torkel Brekke, published in Ethnic and Racial Studies, examined WikiIslam’s content and found that although it claims to be an objective, scholarly resource, its selective criticism results in a distorted view of Islam. The authors observed that the website primarily focuses on controversial aspects of Islamic texts and teachings and, while occasionally citing diverse traditional scholarly opinions, does not adequately represent modern Muslim scholarship or progressive interpretations of contentious topics. The study concluded that WikiIslam fosters the scientification of Islamophobia by adopting an academic tone and referencing sources to appear neutral, ultimately reinforcing negative stereotypes about Islam and Muslims.

== Reactions ==
In 2016 a Wegmans in Fairfax, Virginia, refused to make a cake for the organization that was to be used in celebration of the third anniversary of the group's founding after a supervisor deemed the name of the group offensive; the company subsequently filled the cake order free of charge and issued an apology to EXMNA after legal intervention by a staff attorney from the Freedom From Religion Foundation who described the decision by the employee to refuse service as "a potential civil rights violation".

In 2017, Facebook locked out EXMNA's account for a week because it had allegedly violated the company's terms of service although it did not specify which standards the account had allegedly violated. The page was subsequently unblocked, with a Facebook spokesperson saying in an email to the Observer that "the pages were removed in error and restored as soon as we were able to investigate."
