= Among Nonbelievers =

2015 television programme

- Dutch: Onder Ongelovigen
- Directed by: Dorothée Forma
- Country of origin: Netherlands
- Original languages: Dutch; English

Production
- Running time: 53 minutes

Original release
- Release: 2 September 2015

Related
- Non-believers: Freethinkers on the Run

Among Nonbelievers (Dutch title: Onder Ongelovigen) is a 2015 bilingual English–Dutch documentary on the situation of endangered nonbelievers, especially ex-Muslims, around the world. Set in the United Kingdom, Turkey, the Netherlands and Switzerland, the film is directed by Dorothée Forma and produced by HUMAN with the support of the Dutch Humanist Association. In 2016, it was succeeded by Non-believers: Freethinkers on the Run, which dealt with the fate of apostates and freethinkers in Dutch refugee camps.

== Synopsis ==
Trailer Among Nonbelievers

Boris van der Ham, president of the Dutch Humanist Association, meets up with ex-Muslims in different countries, listens to their stories and discusses with them what should be done about their situation. First, he visits the Istanbul-based office of Ateizm Derneği, an association that serves the interests of atheists, who are regularly threatened, harassed and discriminated in Turkey. Religion is also exploited by president Recep Tayyip Erdoğan's AKP government as an economic power tool, some activists explain in Istanbul.

Next, Van der Ham attends the Secular Conference 2014 in London, organised by the Council of Ex-Muslims of Britain led by Maryam Namazie, where 'secular thinkers, filmmakers and experts convene to raise awareness about the problems experienced by nonbelievers.' There, regular calls are made on Western and European humanists to show more solidarity and dedicated to the rights of nonbelievers outside the Western world. Sudanese ex-Muslim Nahla Mahmoud was targeted by an Islamist hate campaign after she criticised British sharia courts.

Van der Ham also goes to Glasgow for conversations with the Ex-Muslims of Scotland, who are threatened and discriminated against by members of their own family, and cannot return to their country of birth, where they face the death penalty for apostasy or blasphemy. (Note: In 2009, during his tenure as Member of Parliament, Van der Ham took the initiative of abolishing the Dutch law against blasphemy, which was finalised in 2014.) He discusses the Charlie Hebdo shooting with Theodor Holman. Together with other Dutch humanists and freethinkers, Van der Ham marches through The Hague to demand freedom of thought. They offer copies of the 2015 Freedom of Thought Report to ambassadors of a number of countries where nonbelievers are being persecuted and oppressed; he conducts a conversation with the Iraqi ambassador. The report is also received in the Dutch House of Representatives by the House Commission of Foreign Affairs. Elizabeth O'Casey, IHEU representative at the United Nations, explains how Muslim-majority countries internationally always invoke the argument of 'defamation of religion' to continue to violate the human rights of their citizens. Finally, Van der Ham holds a plea for freedom of thought against religious intolerance at the United Nations Human Rights Council in Geneva.

== Cast ==
Maryam Namazie's opening speech at the Secular Conference, partially shown in the film

- Paul Cliteur (former president of the Dutch Humanist Association)
- Richard Dawkins, British scientist and atheist activist
- Nadia El Fani (from Tunisia), film director of Neither Allah nor Master
- Ramin Forghani (from Iran), founder of Ex-Muslims of Scotland
- Boris van der Ham (president of the Dutch Humanist Association)
- Theodor Holman, Dutch television host
- Nahla Mahmoud (from Sudan), spokesperson for the Council of Ex-Muslims of Britain
- Maryam Namazie (from Iran), president of the Council of Ex-Muslims of Britain
- Pieter Omtzigt (CDA), vice-president Dutch House Commission of Foreign Affairs
- Elizabeth O'Casey, IHEU UN human rights delegation chief
- Şafak Pavey, Turkish MP (CHP)
- Onur Roman, Mehmet Emin Üçbağla, Kaan Hatunoğlu, Tolga İnci and several other members of Ateizm Derneği (in Turkey)

== See also ==
- Islam's Non-Believers
