= Irreligion in Pakistan =

Irreligion is present among a minority of mainly young people in Pakistan. Atheists in Pakistan face discrimination, persecution, and prejudice in society. Pakistan is reported by some sources to be among the thirteen countries where atheism can attract capital punishment, but according to the Library of Congress of the United States, "there is no specific statutory law that criminalizes apostasy in Pakistan." On the other hand, the Pakistani government can impose the death penalty for blasphemy. The country's appeasement of Radical Islam has been attributed as the cause for increase in the number of atheists in the country.

Pakistani blogger Ayaz Nizami (pseudonym for Abdul Waheed), the Vice President of Atheist & Agnostic Alliance Pakistan and founder of the website realisticapproach.org, an Urdu website about atheism, was detained under the charges of blasphemy and was sentenced with death penalty in January 2021. This happened shortly after former Prime Minister of Pakistan Nawaz Sharif supported a crackdown on blasphemous material posted on social media and described blasphemy as an "unpardonable offence" in March 2017.

Many atheists in Pakistan have been lynched and imprisoned over unsubstantiated allegations of blasphemy. When the state initiated a full-fledged crackdown on atheism starting 2017, it has become worse with secular bloggers being kidnapped and the government running advertisements urging people to identify blasphemers among them and the highest judges declaring such people to be terrorists.

== History ==
Islam is the official religion of Pakistan, and has been since the formation of the modern Pakistani state. While freedom of religion is guaranteed in Pakistan, atheists are not protected under the constitution. There are minority populations of Hindus, Sikhs, Ahmaddiyas, and Christians in Pakistan today, however atheism is not an option in the census. Many of the non-Muslim populations living in Pakistan have remained there since the Partition of India and Pakistan. According to these individuals Muhammad Ali Jinnah, the founder of Pakistan, wanted the country to be a secular state, heavily inspired by Mustafa Kemal Atatürk of Turkey, but in 1956 the government adopted the Pakistani constitution, making it an Islamic republic. Most of the atheists in Pakistan are those who have decided to leave Islamic teachings, rather than being born into atheism.

Irreligious movements have picked up momentum only in recent history, especially since the birth of the internet, where Pakistani atheists have been able to publicly voice their concerns on forums and websites anonymously. Blasphemy in Pakistan has been an issue for years, and there have been many instances of murders against victims who have been accused, before they have been officially charged. Currently, there are over 80 people in Pakistan on death row for blasphemy.

== Legal status, rights, and laws ==
Blasphemy is against the law in Pakistan, and it is among thirteen countries where it carries the death penalty. The blasphemy laws have been part of the Pakistani constitution since its adoption, but were made more severe under General Zia-ul-Haq's administration, between 1980 and 1986. Section 295C of the Pakistani penal code mandates death as a penalty for:

"Use of derogatory remarks, spoken, written, directly or indirectly, etc. [that] defiles the name of Muhammad or other Prophet(s)"

Pakistan recently passed a cyber crime law, making posting blasphemous content online illegal, and punishable by death. This law is being applied to its full extent, with the government posting advertisements in newspapers urging citizens to report others that may be promoting atheism anonymously. There are several worries that come from the implementation of the bill, including the loss of several rights, including the freedom of religion. The bill is far-reaching, including the ability for the government to work with any foreign governments or agencies in order to track down individuals who may be posting blasphemous content.

=== Demographics ===
It is hard to know the exact number of irreligious people in the country. The National Database and Registration Authority’s (NADRA) doesn't allow citizens to register as an atheist or having no religion. It also restricts people from changing religion from Islam.

Gallup polls conducted between 2005-24 shows atheist population being between 1-2 %. The poll conducted in 2005 showed that around 1% of people were atheist, increasing to 2% in 2012, dipping to 1% again in 2015, and increasing again to 2% in 2024. Another Global Gallup survey in 2024 showed, 5% of Pakistani population describing themselves as “not religious” and 1% as "convinced atheists".

However, almost every leader of Pakistan has supported the blasphemy laws.

== Persecution and attacks ==
Attacks on irreligious people in Pakistan happen often, with more attacks occurring especially after the introduction of the blasphemy laws in the 21st century. One of the most high-profile cases involved former Punjab governor Salman Taseer, who was assassinated by his bodyguard in 2011 as a reaction to his public opposition to blasphemy laws. There have been several instances since then of several online activists being abducted by Pakistani security forces, including Salman Haider, a left-leaning poet who often voiced his opposition to Pakistani policies online.

Several prominent irreligious Pakistanis have either fled the country, or continue to be activists outside of Pakistan. For example, activists like Ali A. Rizvi and Aliyah Saleem have spoken out against blasphemy laws from outside of Pakistan, and have not returned since making these comments. Tariq Ali is an example of an activist that fled the country in order to protect himself from persecution from the Pakistani government, leaving Pakistan for London in his twenties and becoming a strong proponent for atheism. Vigilantism is a big problem for those accused of blasphemy in Pakistan, and many go into hiding, are put into solitary confinement, and/or are denied bail in order to protect those yet to be put on trial.

== Pakistan Atheists and Agnostics ==
A notable organization in Pakistan is the Pakistan Atheists and Agnostics. The group originally began on Facebook, but was frequently shut down and unused because of the lack of anonymity. In 2011, the group began a website, which has then become incredibly popular in not just Pakistan, but plenty of other Islamic countries where atheists may be persecuted. The website was initially reported by some Indian media outlets to be a place for Pakistani youth that were turning away from Islam, but the PAA argues against this. Instead, they see it as a place for all atheists and agnostics in Pakistan to discuss various topics, including those that have left Hinduism and Sikhism. Various related groups on Facebook and Twitter have led to a multitude of meetings and discussion, both online and in person, which have led to long-term friendships between members. There have been various efforts by the Pakistani government to take down these pages, some of which end up being successful. Facebook pages have gone down several times, as well as the Twitter accounts linked to PAA. A formal notice to take down the PAA Twitter account was sent by the Pakistani government in 2019, after which there have not been any more tweets from the account.

In 2012, Atheist & Agnostic Alliance Pakistan was founded by Fauzia Ilyas. It was the first public atheist and non-religious organization in a country with Islam as its state religion. Ilyas and her co-founder, Sayed Gillani, married and fled the country after their identities were revealed in 2015. After being charged with blasphemy, they received asylum in the Netherlands and have been living there since, continuing to be activists and lobbying the Pakistani government to revoke blasphemy laws. As of 2015, the organization had over 3,000 members.

== See also ==
- Religion in Pakistan
- Secularism in Pakistan
- Freedom of religion in Pakistan
- Islam in Pakistan
- Hinduism in Pakistan
- Christianity in Pakistan
- Demographics of Pakistan
