= Association of Atheism =

Turkish non-profit organisation

Ateizm Derneği
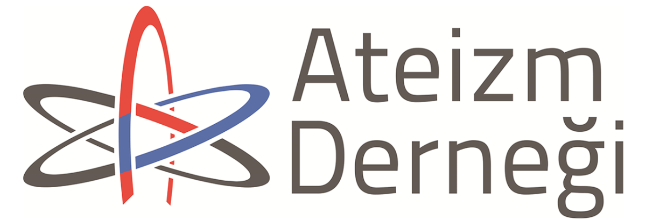
- Founded: 16 April 2014
- Type: Non-profit organisation
- Purpose: Promotion of atheism Protection of nonreligious people
- Location: Kadıköy, Istanbul
- Region served: Turkey
- Key people: Süleyman Karan
- Website: ateizmdernegi.org.tr

Ateizm Derneği (English: Association of Atheism) is a Turkish non-profit organisation that describes itself as a freethinker association founded on 16 April 2014 for the promotion and advocacy of the concept of atheism, and serves to support irreligious people and freethinkers in Turkey who are discriminated against based on their views. Ateizm Derneği is headquartered in Kadıköy, Istanbul.

== History ==
Among Nonbelievers trailer, featuring Ateizm Derneği

At the time of the founding, the organisation was headed by a board consisting of eleven members, presided by Tolga İnci. It is the first legally recognised Turkish atheist organisation, and simultaneously one of the first in the Muslim-majority world.

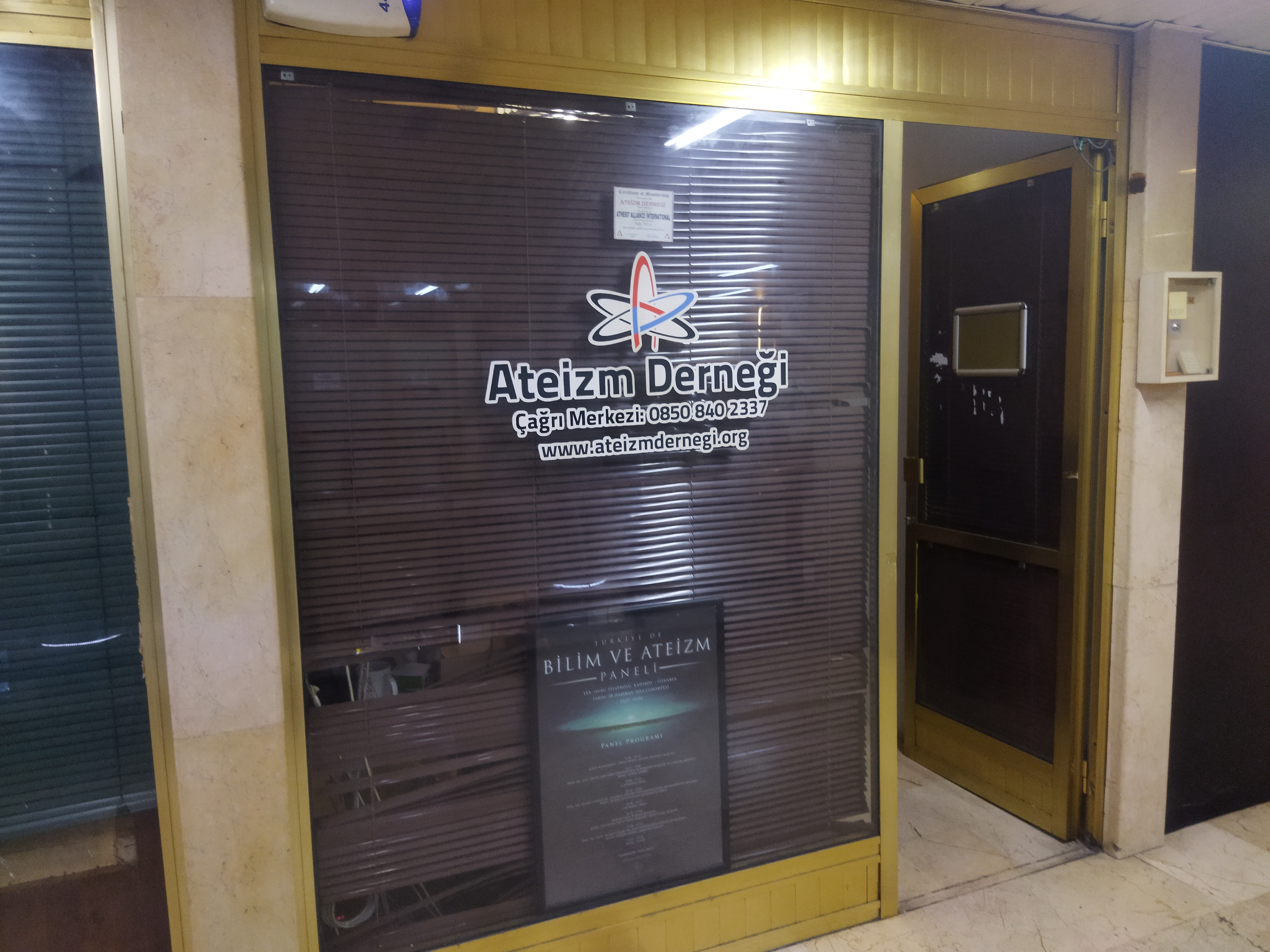
Istanbul branch of Ateizm Derneği

The founding of the association had no bureaucratic obstacles, but the association has been a target of harassment and threats, so appropriate security measures have been taken since.

In 2015, Ateizm Derneği was featured in Dorothée Forma's Dutch documentary film Among Nonbelievers, where several of its members were interviewed by former Dutch Member of Parliament and Dutch Humanist Association president Boris van der Ham.

In 2018, it was reported in some media outlets that the Ateizm Derneği would close down because of the pressure on its members and attacks by pro-government media, but the association itself issued a clarification that this was not the case and that it was still active.

== Recognition and awards ==
Ateizm Derneği was recognised by the European Union as the representative organisation of Turkish atheists in June 2014.

In 2017, the association won the International League of Non-religious and Atheists's Sapio Award for being the first organisation in the Middle East defending the rights of atheists.

== Hate speech and persecution against atheists ==
Association members are targeted and received death threats, access to associations web sites was blocked in Turkey with alleged charges of possible disturbance to law and order.

In November 2021, during a stereotyping hate speech AKP writer tr:Emine Şenlikoğlu said, “Atheism and deism are like the animal kingdom..." Şenlikoğlu said, "Father and daughter, mother and son and sibling in atheism or deism indulge in incest." Ateizm Derneği filed criminal complaint against the hate speech.

== See also ==
- Freedom of religion in Turkey
