= Nahla Mahmoud =

Sudanese-born British ex-Muslim activist

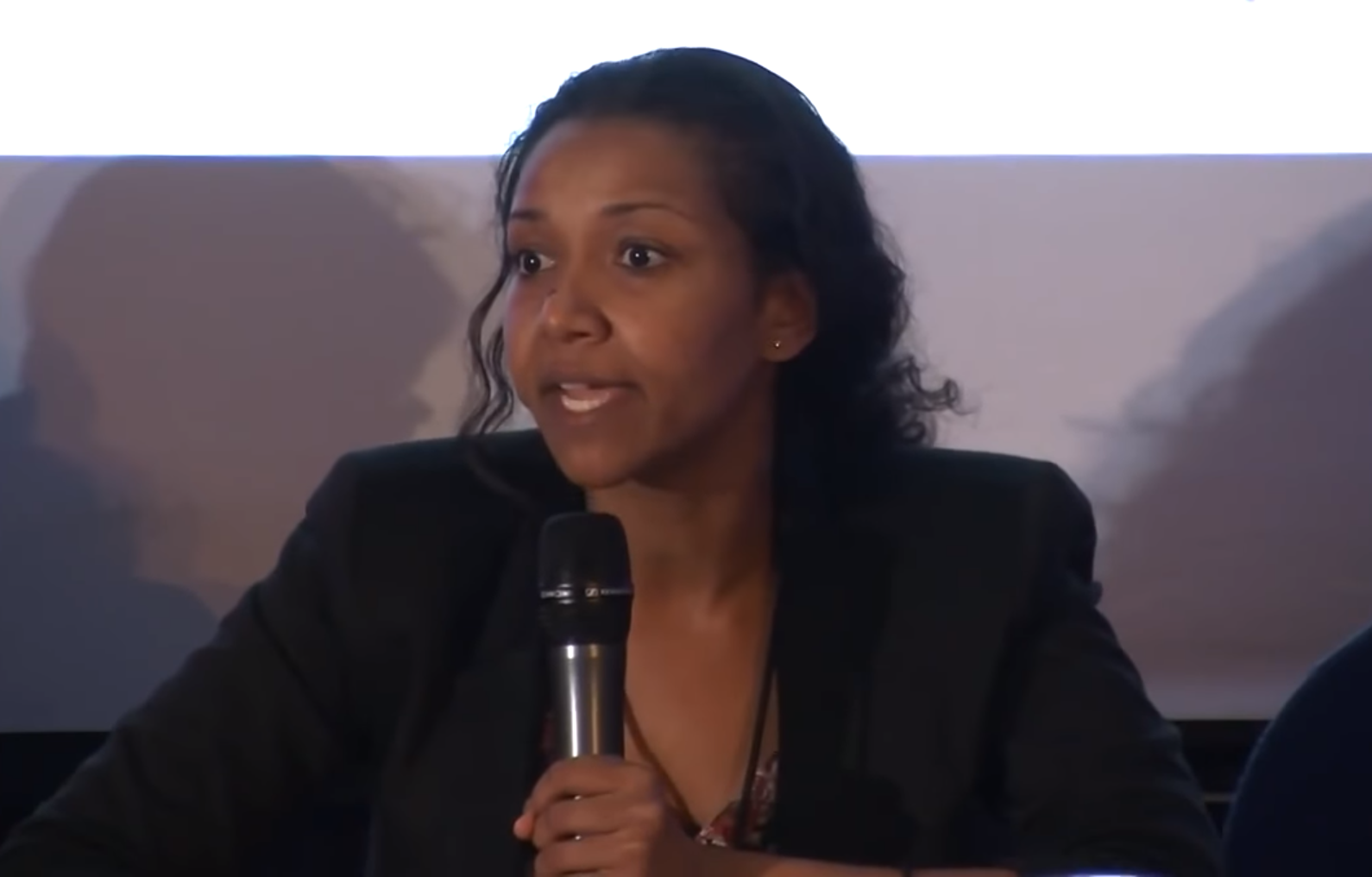
- Nahla Mahmoud speaking at the Secular Conference 2014
- Born: 1986 or 1987 (age 38–39); Wau, Sudan (present-day South Sudan)
- Education: University of Khartoum
- Occupation: Spokesperson for the Council of Ex-Muslims of Britain
- Known for: Human rights activism

Nahla Mahmoud (Arabic: نهلة محمود, born 1987/7) is a Sudanese-born British writer, ex-Muslim, secularist, environmentalist, human rights activist and spokesperson for the Council of Ex-Muslims of Britain. She's known for being vocal against religious extremism; advocating free-speech, LGBTQ rights and awareness on climate change. She fled to the United Kingdom in 2010.

== Early life and education ==
Mahmoud was born in Wau, Sudan and raised as a Sunni Muslim. In primary school art class, she drew a picture of Allah, which is considered forbidden by most Muslims, and her teacher punished her for it. Mahmoud was disgruntled by the fact that she did not enjoy the same rights as boys and men, that she could not draw or sculpt what she wanted or keep a dog as a pet, that she was not allowed to ask critical questions and that she could not learn about evolution.

Mahmoud studied ecology at the University of Khartoum, and worked for the Science Students Association. At university she came across a professor who opposed the Omar al-Bashir regime; he had just been released from jail where he had been tortured for teaching the theory of evolution. This revelation shocked her and made her feel like she did not exist in Sudan as a woman, as a scientist. “These incidents made me gradually refuse Islam until I completely renounced it and became an atheist.” This made life even more difficult for her, because under Sudanese law at the time, apostasy could be punishable by the death penalty. Mahmoud resolved that she no longer wanted to live under Sharia in Sudan, and eventually fled to the UK in 2010.

== Activism ==
=== Sharia interview controversy ===
Nahla Mahmoud on Islamic hate speech and apostasy culture in the UK

Mahmoud became a spokesperson for the Council of Ex-Muslims of Britain (CEMB). In this capacity she appeared in a short (1 minute, 39 seconds) television interview on Channel 4's 4thought.tv in January 2013 to give her perspective on "What does Sharia law have to offer Britain?". She recounted how she grew up living under Sharia in Sudan, where she was ‘always dealt with as a second-class citizen, always brought up to believe that I am an incomplete human being [who] needed a man as a guard. Mahmoud found it astonishing that Britain, the country she had fled to escape Islamic rule, maintained a similar system of sharia courts, arguing that ‘Everyone should have equal rights and live under one secular law.’ This interview led her to be targeted by an Islamist hate campaign, led by Salah Al Bander, director of the Sudan Civic Foundation and a former LibDem councilor in Cambridge City Council, who called Mahmoud a ‘Kafira’ (unbeliever) on a Sudanese Arabic website. He stated that ‘I will not forgive anyone who wants to start a battle against Islam and the beliefs of the people’. When mosques and Sudanese newspapers took up the campaign against her, Mahmoud received numerous death threats and both she and her family in Sudan were harassed; her brother over there was physically attacked. Even the official Facebook page of the Sudanese Armed Forces called Mahmoud an infidel and apostate. The local LibDem leader, Spencer Hagard, who investigated Al Bander, saw no fault in his behaviour and even regarded him more highly than before. Mahmoud filed a complaint with the police but received no protection, and instead got the suggestion to keep quiet about her views.

=== Ex-Muslim rights ===
Nahla Mahmoud and Maryam Namazie discuss apostasy in Sudan and the Meriam Ibrahim case (2014)

At the Secular Conference 2014, Mahmoud highlighted the aggression from Islamists faced by ex-Muslims, critics of Islam, atheists of all backgrounds, and anti-traditional liberal Muslims, commenting that it was "really scary" that a 2011 Policy Exchange survey found that 34% of British Muslims aged 16 to 24 supported the death penalty for apostasy. She rebuked the regressive left attitude of some Westerners who dismiss any kind of criticism of Islam as 'islamophobia', and ignore Islamic intolerance in the spirit of 'multiculturalism'.

Mahmoud has estimated that during the years 2010, 2011 and 2012, there have been between 120 and 170 Sudanese citizens who have been convicted for apostasy, most of whom repented to avoid a death sentence.

Mahmoud appeared in Among Nonbelievers (2015), a Dutch documentary on HUMAN about the situation of ex-Muslims worldwide.

=== Environmentalism ===
Mahmoud is an environmentalist who is passionate about nature and received training as an ecologist. In her 2013 research paper "Climate Change and Violent Conflicts in East Africa" for the Evelyn Oldfield Unit, she sought to question the traditional analyses of conflicts, which rely primarily on ethnic, religious and cultural explanations since these do not take account of the increasingly obvious link between the growing scarcity of renewable resources and violent conflict in the three East African countries Sudan, South Sudan and Ethiopia. Shortages of cropland, fresh water, woodland, pasture and marine resources cannot be ignored."

== See also ==
- Ayaan Hirsi Ali
- Criticism of Islam
- Maryam Namazie
- Yasmine Mohammed
