= Fauzia Ilyas =

Dutch Pakistani speaker

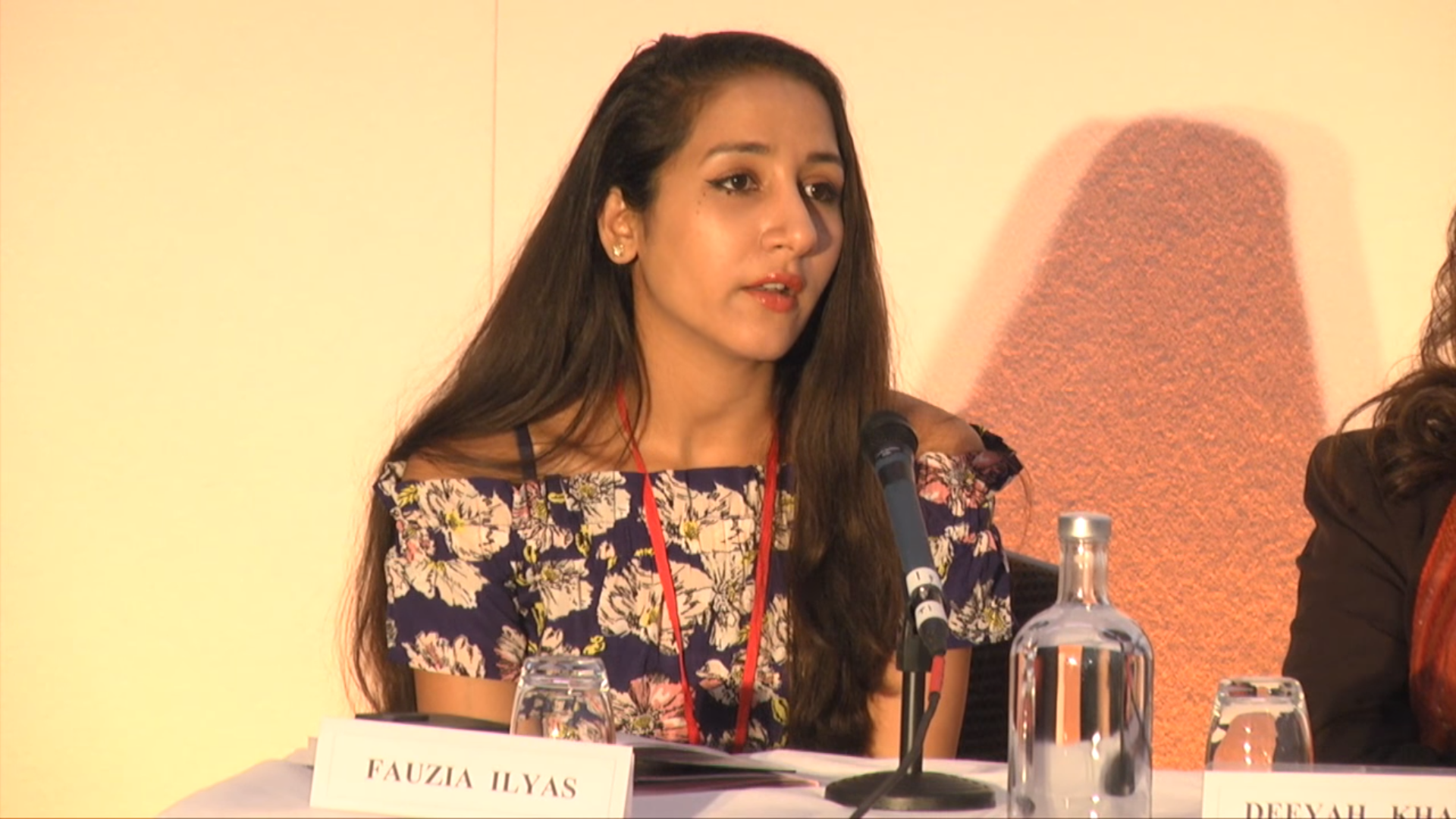
- Fauzia Ilyas speaking in London in 2017
- Born: 26 May 1989 (age 36); Pakistan
- Occupations: President and co-founder of Atheist & Agnostic Alliance Pakistan; Speaker; Political activist
- Years active: 2012–present
- Known for: Criticism on Islam
- Movement: Secular movement

Fauzia Ilyas (فوزیہ الیاس; born 1989) is a Dutch Pakistani speaker, political activist, and the president and co-founder of Atheist and Agnostic Alliance Pakistan. Ilyas, an open atheist and apostate of Islam, fled from Pakistan after receiving threats to her life and faced potential legal charges for blasphemy in Pakistan. Ilyas received asylum in the Netherlands, where she is a critic of Islam and campaigner for feminism, secularism, and atheist rights in Pakistan.

== Biography ==
=== Youth and arranged marriage ===
Ilyas was born in 1989 and grew up in a religious Sunni Muslim family in Pakistan. At the age of 16, her father announced her arranged marriage with a businessman whom she had never met, and her new husband forced her to wear a veil and sexually abused her. Ilyas sought help from her parents, but they refused, giving Islamic excuses for her husband's behaviour. After daily unanswered prayers, Ilyas increasingly questioned the existence of God and professed her doubts to her husband, who reacted by forcing her out of their home and preventing her from seeing their daughter.

=== Apostasy and escape ===
Ilyas tells her story (15:53) at the International Conference on Free Expression and Conscience 2017.

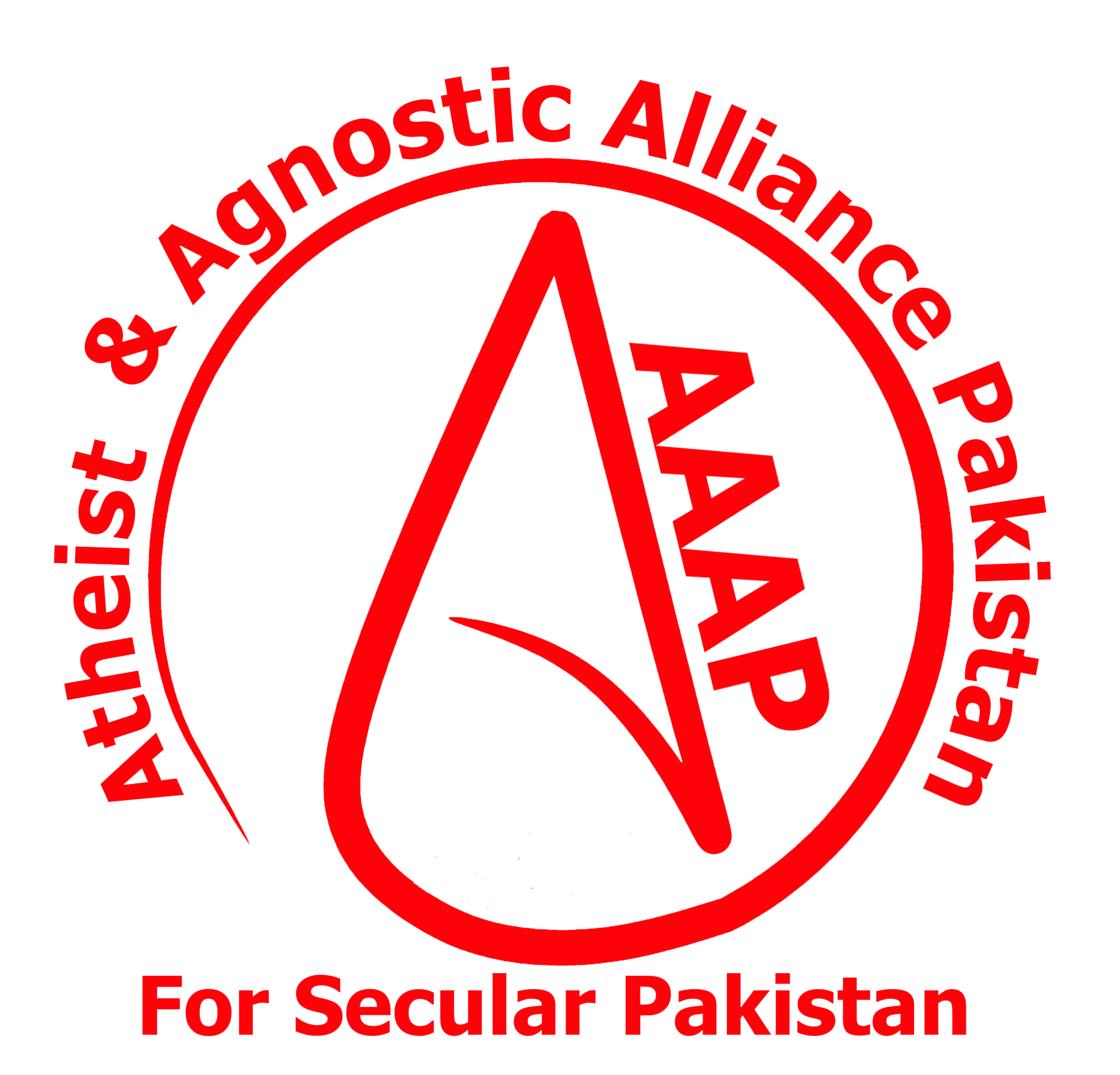
Atheist & Agnostic Alliance Pakistan Logo

Later, Ilyas met a fellow atheist in Lahore named Sayed Gillani. They married and together founded Atheist & Agnostic Alliance Pakistan in 2012. After failing to keep their identities secret, Ilyas and Gillani faced death threats and charges of blasphemy, which is legally punishable by death in Pakistan. In 2015, they fled via Dubai to the Netherlands. First, Ilyas arrived in an asylum centre in Den Helder on 30 August, and was joined by Gillani in December after friends helped him fund his escape from Pakistan.

=== Activism ===
As of December 2015, the Atheist & Agnostic Alliance of Pakistan had about 3,000 members.

Ilyas featured both in Deeyah Khan's British documentary Islam's Non-Believers (October 2016) and in Dorothée Forma's Dutch documentary Non-believers: Freethinkers on the Run (December 2016).

Ilyas, Maryam Namazie and others demanding the release of Ayaz Nizami and others accused of blasphemy and apostasy (April 2017)

In January 2017, Ilyas presented her story to the European Parliament with the International Humanist and Ethical Union. In April, she also received the International Atheist of the Year award.

She argued that Facebook should be a platform for freedom of expression, and stop facilitating the Islamist crackdown against so-called "blasphemers".

== See also ==
- Ali A. Rizvi, Pakistani-born Canadian ex-Muslim activist and writer
- Aliyah Saleem, Pakistani-born ex-Muslim activist from Faith to Faithless
- Ex-Muslims of North America, co-founded by Pakistani-American ex-Muslim activists Muhammad Syed and Sarah Haider
- Maajid Nawaz, Pakistani-British liberal Muslim activist
- Sabatina James, Pakistani-born Austrian humanitarian
