= Caroline Fourest =

French writer and journalist

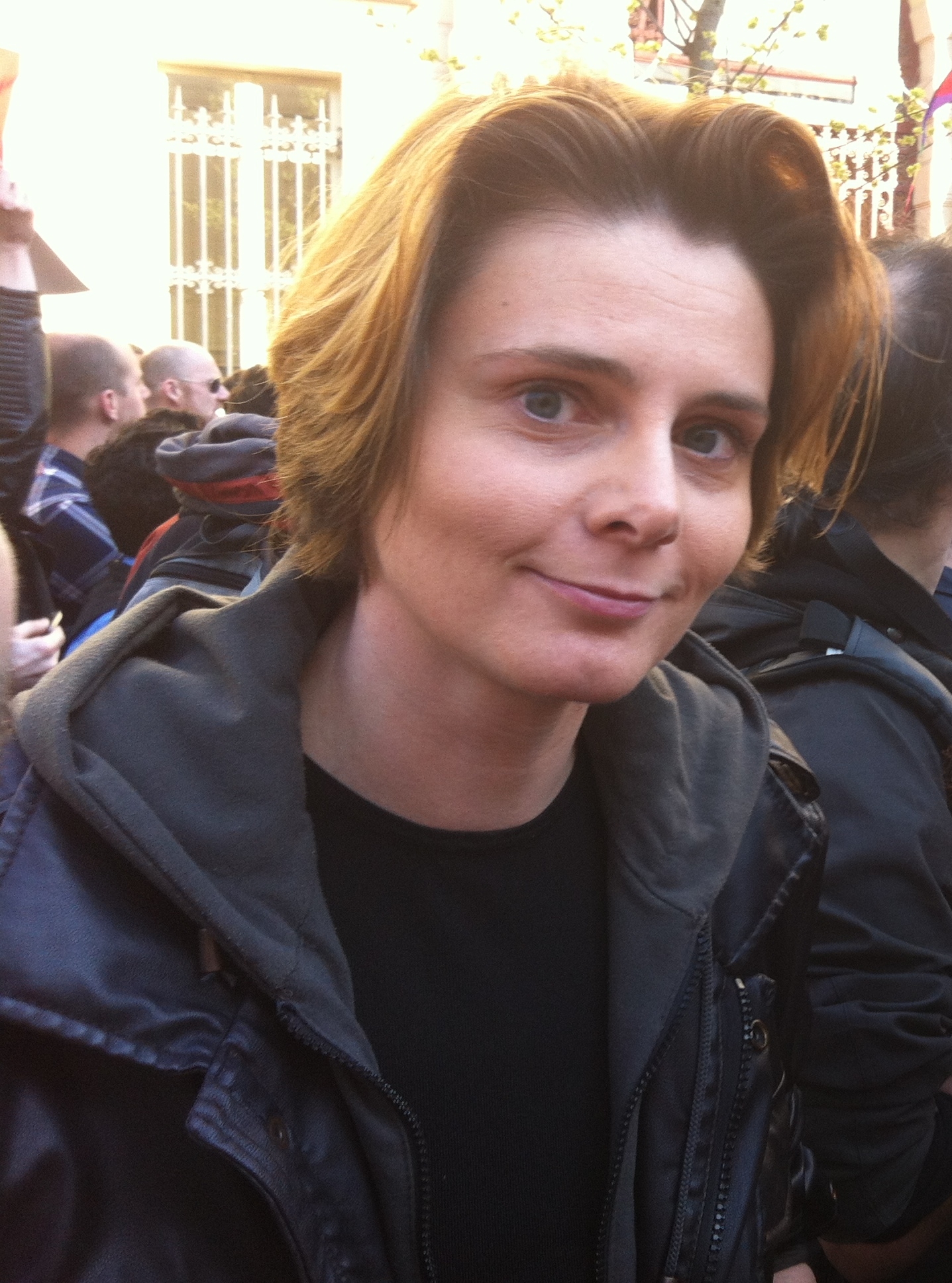
- Fourest at a gathering organised by Inter-LGBT to celebrate the law 2013-404 opening marriage to same-sex couples in France
- Born: 19 September 1975 (age 51); Aix-en-Provence, France
- Education: EHESS, Sorbonne
- Occupations: Writer; Journalist; Filmmaker

Caroline Fourest (French: [kaʁɔlin fuʁɛst]; born 19 September 1975) is a French writer, feminist political commentator, film director, and journalist. She is a radio presenter at France Culture, and editor of the magazine ProChoix. She was also a columnist for Charlie Hebdo, for Le Monde until 14 July 2012, and she joined Marianne in 2016. She frequently appears on French media to discuss issues related to Muslims, feminism, Charlie Hebdo and Israel.

Fourest is the editorial director of the French weekly paper, Franc-Tireur, since April 2022 and one of its founders. Prior to April 2022, she was also an advisor to the editorial committee. The name was inspired by the resistance journal, Franc-Tireur, from the Second World War.

== Education and career ==
A graduate in sociology and political science, Fourest has written many books about the conservative right, the anti-abortion movement (France and USA), and contemporary fundamentalist trends in Abrahamic religions. She also began serving as the President of the Gay and Lesbian Center in 1999.

In March 2006, Fourest signed MANIFESTO: Together facing the new totalitarianism, a manifesto opposing Islamist totalitarianism that gained wide publicity. The other eleven signatories include Salman Rushdie, Ibn Warraq, Maryam Namazie, Taslima Nasreen, and Ayaan Hirsi Ali.

Fourest has received several political awards for her work, including the National Award of "Laïcité" in 2005, and the "Award of the political book" in 2006. She is an honorary associate of the National Secular Society,

She is an advisory board member of the Anna Lindh Foundation, an organization focused on intercultural dialogue.

Fourest has opposed far right FN politician Marine Le Pen and her politics in a book co-authored with Fiammetta Venner. She is the author of Frère Tariq ("Brother Tariq" 2008), a critical look at the works of Muslim intellectual Tariq Ramadan, the central charges of which she and Mr. Ramadan later debated.

In 2014 the Conseil supérieur de l'audiovisuel, the institution regulating the media in France, accuses Fourest of lack of rigor and unverified statements in her reporting of the Russo-Ukrainian War.

Franc Tireur, of which Fourest is editorial director, was founded in November 2021 and its first issue was released on 17 November 2021 in newsstands. The objective of the paper is to combat extremes on the political spectrum, advocate against populism and identitarianism and in favor of universalism, reason and humanism.

== Defamation accusations ==
In October 2012, Fourest was sentenced to pay a fine of €800 and €3300 respectively in damages for libel against Marine Le Pen, Jean-Marie Le Pen and Franck Chauffroy in a biography she wrote titled Marine Le Pen.

In October 2014, Fourest suggested that a racist attack on 17 year old Muslim girl Rabia Bentot in 2013 could have been fabricated or that if it was real, Bentot's family could have been responsible. Fourest was subsequently accused of libel and ordered to pay €6,000. The verdict has been appealed and overturned since the accusation was made after the three-month legal delay. Bentot was ordered to pay back to Fourest €4,000 for wrongful legal action.

== Works ==
Fourest sends a solidarity message to ex-Muslims convening in London in July 2017.

=== Books ===
- Fourest, Caroline; Fiammetta Venner (1998). Le guide des sponsors du Front national et de ses amis (in French). Paris: R. Castells.
- Fourest, Caroline; Fiammetta Venner (1999). Les anti-pacs ou La dernière croisade homophobe (in French). Paris: Éditions Prochoix.
- Fourest, Caroline (2000). Foi contre choix: la droite religieuse et le mouvement pro-life aux Etats-Unis [Faith against choice: The religious right and the prolife movement] (in French). Paris: Golias.
- Fourest, Caroline (2003). Tirs croisés: la laïcité à l'épreuve des intégrismes juif, chrétien et musulman [Crossfire: Jewish, Christian and Muslim fanaticism against secularism] (in French). Paris: Calmann-Lévy.
- Fourest, Caroline (2007). Le choc des préjugés: l'impasse des postures sécuritaires et victimaires (in French). Paris: Calmann-Lévy.
- Fourest, Caroline (2008). Brother Tariq: The Doublespeak of Tariq Ramadan. New York: Encounter Books. ISBN 978-1-59403-215-8.
- Fourest, Caroline (2009). La tentation obscurantiste [The last utopia: threats against universalism] (in French). Paris: Grasset.
- Nasreen, Taslima; Fourest, Caroline (2010). Libres de le dire: conversations mécréantes [Free to say it] (in French). Paris: Flammarion Lettres. ISBN 978-2-08-123300-3.
- Fourest, Caroline; Fiammetta Venner (2011). Marine Le Pen (in French). Paris: Éditions Grasset.
- Fourest, Caroline (2014). Inna: Les paradoxes d'une Femen (in French). Paris: Éditions Grasset. ISBN 978-2-24-680732-2.
- Fourest, Caroline (2015). In Praise of Blasphemy: Why Charlie Hebdo is Not "islamophobic". Paris: Grasset.
- Fourest, Caroline (2016). Génie de la laïcité [The genius of secularism]. Paris: Bernard Grasset.
- L'Islamophobie Jérôme Blanchet-Gravel (dir.) et Éric Debroise (codir.), éditions Dialogue Nord-Sud, 2016, 250 p.
- Géneration offensée. De la police de la culture à la police de la pensée, 2020.

=== Filmography ===
- Sœur Innocenta, priez pour nous !, medium-length documentary co-directed with Fiammetta Venner.
- Safia et Sarah, short film, 18 minutes (2004).
- Hymen : certifiées vierges, documentary (Envoyé spécial, France 2, 2008).
- La Bataille des droits de l'homme, documentary (Arte, 2009).
- Des Petits Soldats contre l'avortement, documentary (Canal+, 2011).
- Marine Le Pen, l'héritière, documentary co-directed with Fiammetta Venner (France 2, 2011).
- 100 Muslim women talk about themselves, documentary series of 20 episodes co-directed with Fiammetta Venner (France 24, 2011).
- Nos seins, nos armes ! (Our breasts, our weapons!), documentary about Femen co-directed and co-written with Nadia El Fani (France 2, 2013)
- Les Réseaux de l'extrême, documentary series in four parts: Les Obsédés du complot, Les Radicaux de l'islam, Les Enragés de l'identité and Les Naufragés de Sion (France 5, 2013).
- Cahiers de doléances, documentary series in 9 parts: (LCP, 2013).
- Sisters in Arms, a war-drama film (2019) based on real events (Red Snake was the working title).
