= Surprising Europe =

- Presented by: See Reporters below

Original release
- Network: Al Jazeera English; Humanistische Omroep
- Release: August 8, 2011 – 2012

Surprising Europe, is a news magazine series, which premiered on Al Jazeera English in August 2011 and also aired on Humanistische Omroep in the Netherlands. The series explores the experiences of Europe's African immigrant population. The series has nine episodes.

== Premise ==
Ssuuna Golooba used to work as a Photo journalist in Uganda before he decided to go to Europe to seek his fortune as an undocumented migrant. He had to find out the hard way that pastures in Europe are not as green as they seem to be. Ssuuna ended up living in anonymity of an undocumented migrant for more than five years. He survived on the scarce income he generated by doing irregular cleaning jobs.

== Developments ==
Ssuuna was in the Netherlands in 2005 when a fire broke our at Schiphol Airport Amsterdam, an accident that reached international headlines. Eleven undocumented migrants, who were kept in captivity before their deportation by airplane, died in the fire. Many more were injured. This event was a turning point in Ssuuna's perception of Europe. He could have never imagined that a disaster of this scale could take place in wealthy, well-organized Europe.

"Many people sell their assets in the name of traveling to Europe to make a fortune over night but I want to warn them that the Schiphol incident was one in many that are not even know[n]," Ssuuna said.

The blast triggered his almost-departed instincts as a journalist: In a way, it opened his eyes to the miserable situation he was in himself. Now he could clearly see that his life was trapped between false expectations of Europe and too high expectations of his family back home in Uganda. How could he convince his family of the difficult situation that undocumented migrants like him were in, deprived from any rights, protection and opportunities?

Ssuuna Golooba thus took up the initiative to make a television series with stories from Africans all over Europe. He is definitely not the only African migrant suffering in Europe. Many of the problems stem from the fact that African migrants come to Europe without proper papers and with a false image of their possibilities in Europe. This could change by showing the stories of migrants to the people back home in Africa.

His idea was picked up by the European production company The White Boys, which was willing to help him make the TV series. The making of Surprising Europe was a dream come true. It gave him the feeling that his suffering was not in vain. He can inform his fellow Africans at home, preventing them to make irreversible mistakes. And he knows exactly how they feel, because he used to be in the same situation.

== Reporters ==
Like their subjects, all of the reporters are immigrants to Europe from Africa.

=== Current reporters ===
Current reporters as of 2011:

- Ssuuna Golooba (2011)
- K-Nel (host, 2011)
- Lord Ekomy Ndong (2011)
- Sorious Samura (2011)
- Sister Fa (2011)
- Ade Bantu (2011)
