= Ayaz Nizami =

Political prisoner and atheist ex-Sunni imam

Fauzia Ilyas, Maryam Namazie and others demanding the release of Ayaz Nizami and others accused of blasphemy and apostasy (April 2017)

Ayaz Nizami is a blogger and political prisoner in Pakistan known for his arrest on 24 March 2017 for alleged blasphemy, with a possible death penalty for such charges.

He was given the death sentence in January 2021.

== Biography ==
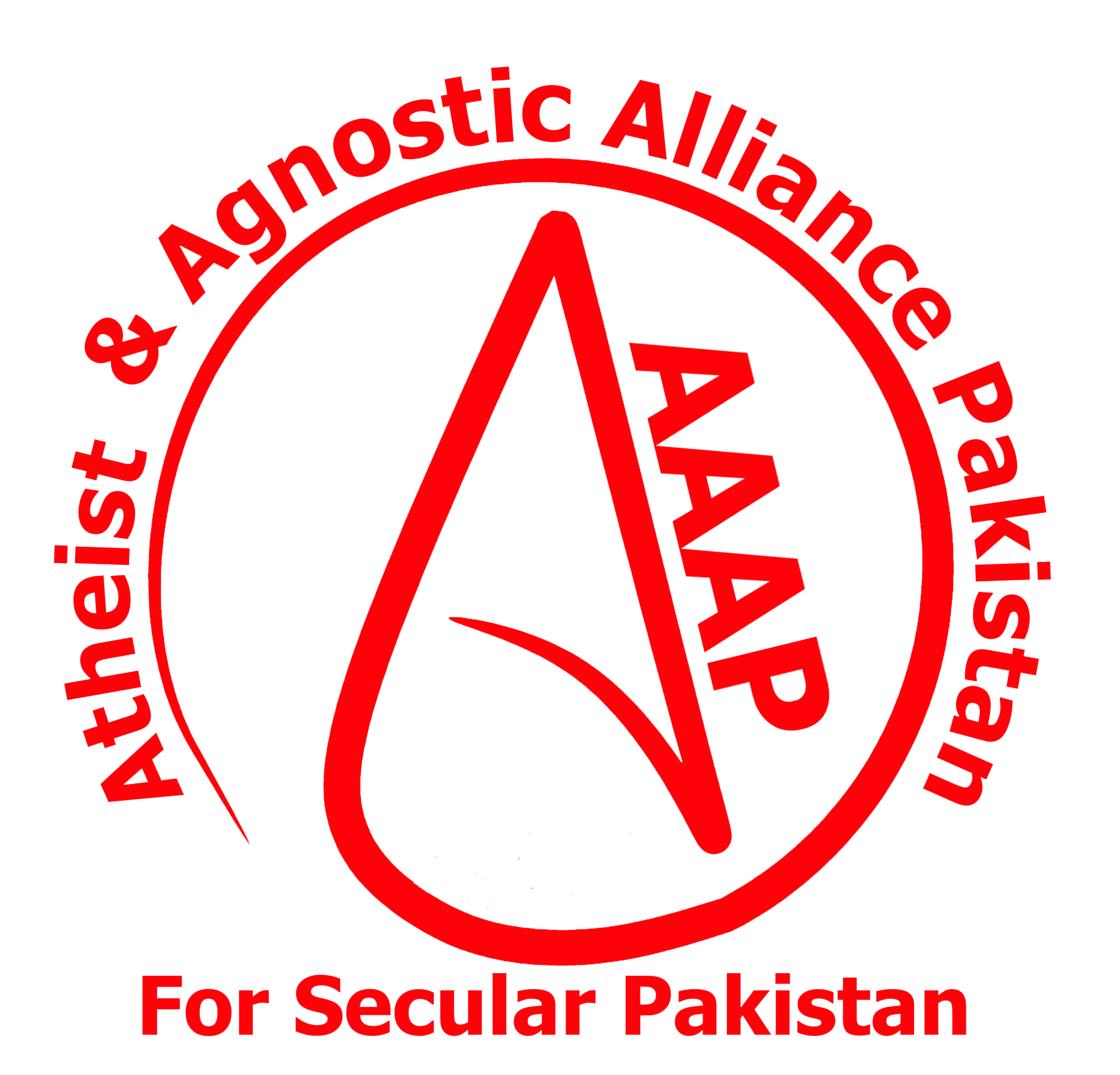
AAAP

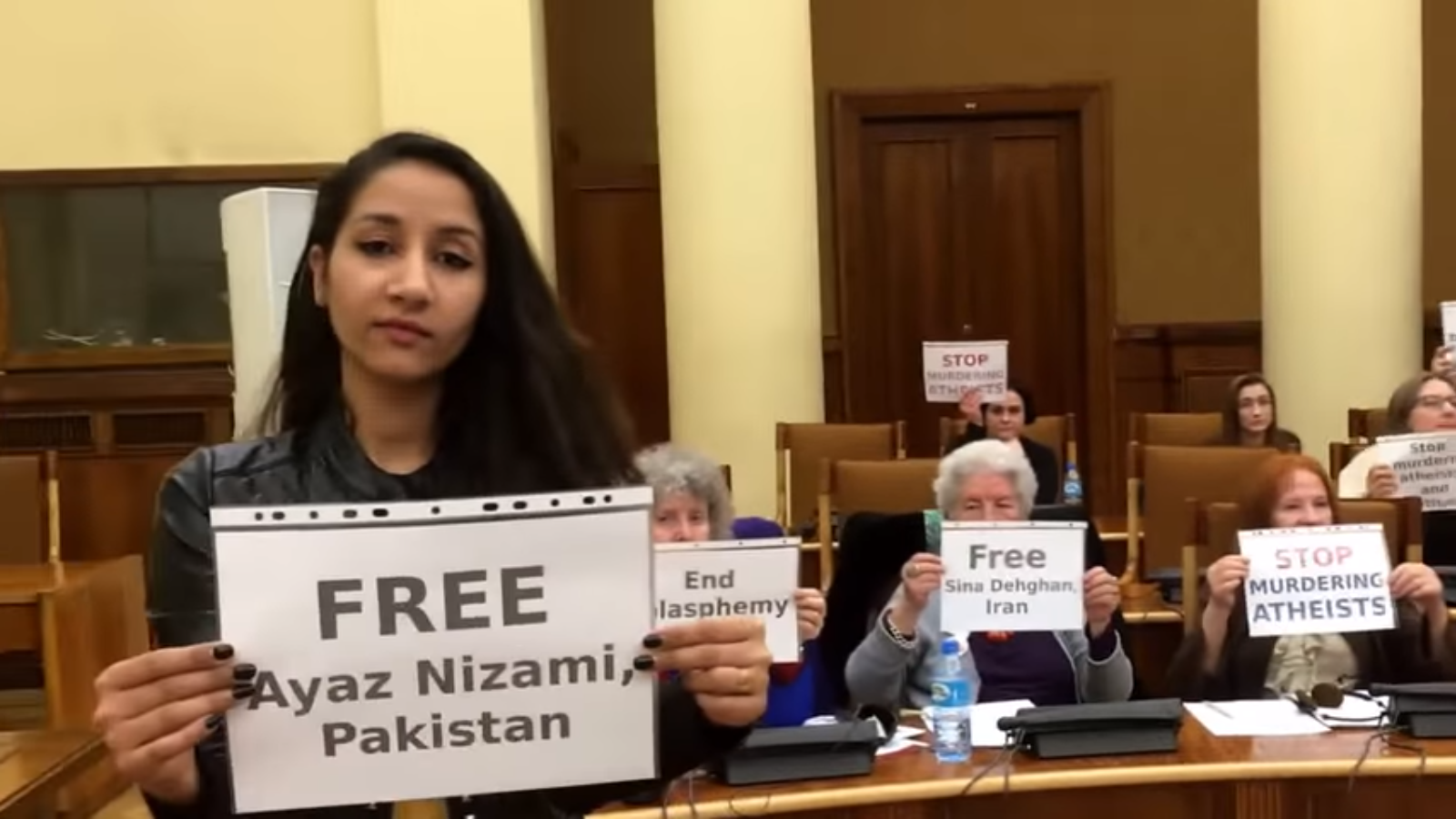
Fauzia Ilyas holding banner 'Free Ayaz Nizami'

=== Early life ===
Ayaz Nizami is a pseudonym for Abdul Waheed. Waheed is a religious scholar, who primarily specialises in Islamic law such as "tafsir, Hadiths, Fiqh and their principles"; besides this, he is an expert in Arabic language, grammar, terminology, philosophy and rational thinking. He received his religious education after completing the standard education and was admitted to a religious school.

=== Activism ===
Before his arrest, he allegedly translated materials critical of Islam in English to Urdu for publishing, and was first exposed by Alyan Khan, a Pakistani political author. Nizami founded the website realisticapproach.org, a website in Urdu about irreligion, and allegedly served as the vice president of the Atheist & Agnostic Alliance Pakistan.

=== Arrest ===
On 24 March 2017, Nizami was arrested for alleged blasphemy by the Federal Investigation Agency, and other agencies in Pakistan. Two other bloggers were arrested along with Nizami in a crackdown on social media content deemed blasphemous by the Pakistani government. After his arrest, the hashtag #hangayaznizami and #FreeAyazNizami was trending on Twitter in Pakistan, and authorities shut down his social media account over material deemed controversial.

== See also ==
- Freedom of religion in Pakistan
- Political repression of cyber-dissidents
