= Non-believers: Freethinkers on the Run =

2016 Dutch documentary

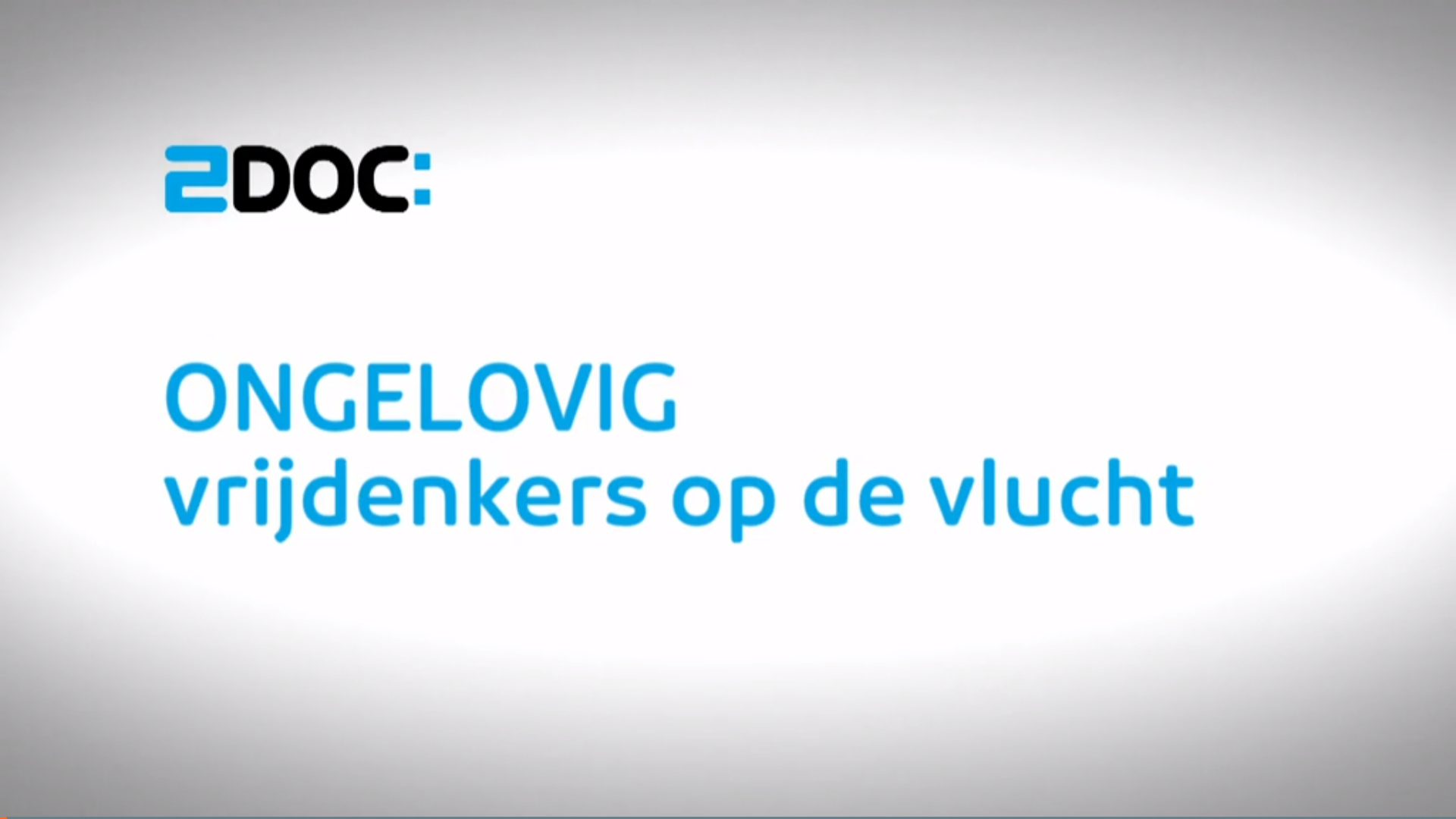
- Dutch: Ongelovig – Vrijdenkers op de vlucht
- Directed by: Dorothée Forma
- Country of origin: Netherlands
- Original languages: Dutch; English

Production
- Running time: 47 minutes

Original release
- Release: 13 December 2016

Related
- Among Nonbelievers

Non-believers: Freethinkers on the Run (original Dutch title: Ongelovig – Vrijdenkers op de vlucht) is a 2016 Dutch documentary on the situation of atheists, especially Muslim apostates, in Dutch refugee camps (AZCs). The film is directed by Dorothée Forma and produced by HUMAN with the support of the Dutch Humanist Association. It is the sequel of Among Nonbelievers (2015), which dealt with some of the situations of former Muslims.

== Synopsis ==
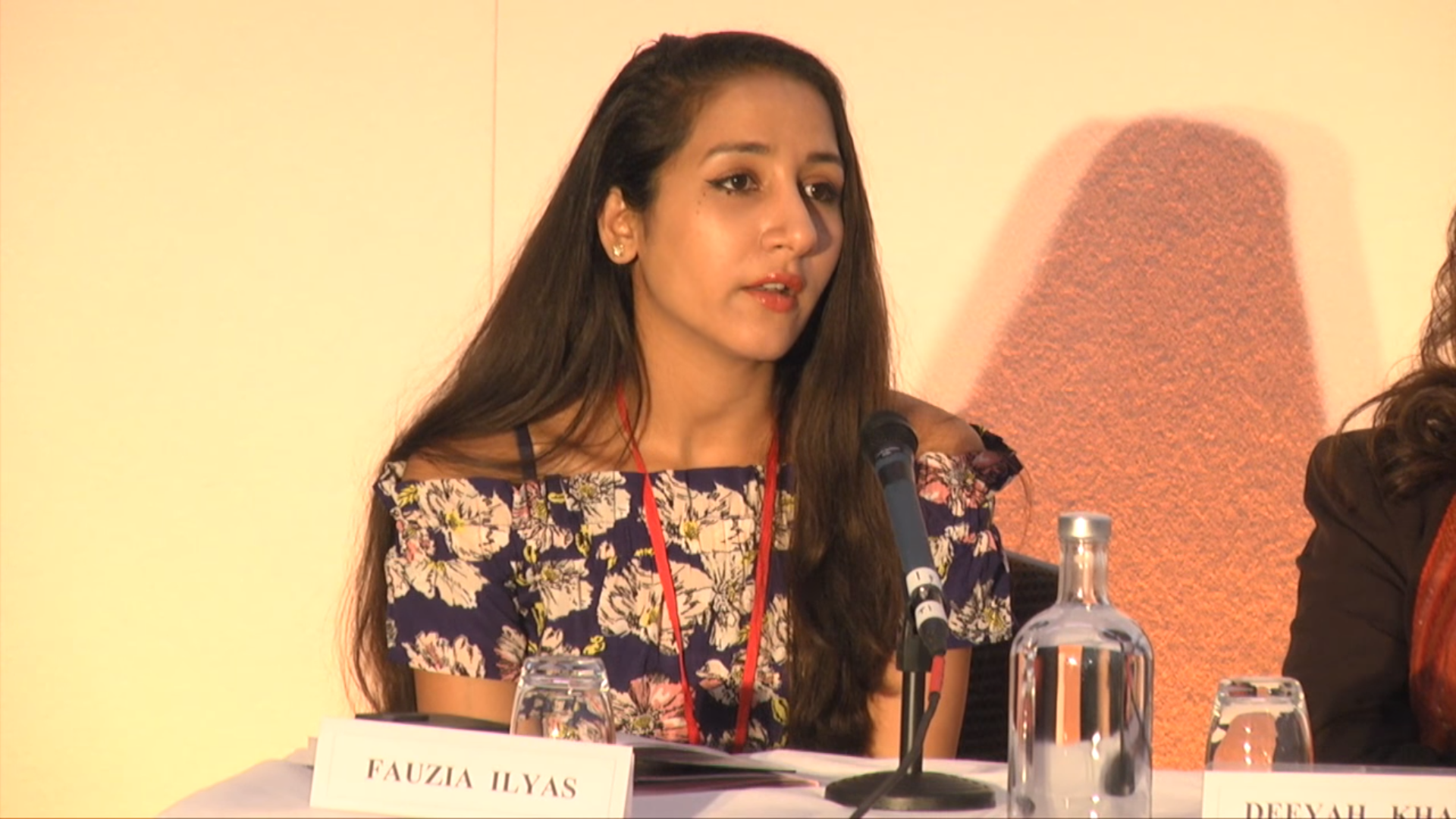
Pakistani ex-Muslim and activist Fauzia Ilyas had to flee to the Netherlands in 2015.

In Non-believers: Freethinkers on the Run, five ex-Muslims and one ex-Buddhist tell their story. Each one received multiple death threats because of their disbelief, had to flee their country of birth, and applied for asylum in the Netherlands. They describe their situation in AZCs as being comparable in many ways, and in some aspects even worse, than in they country they escaped from.

Fellow refugees constantly ask them whether they are Muslim, and if not, pressure them to convert to Islam. Irreligious asylum seekers are also told to observe Islamic rules, such as abstaining from alcohol or smoking during Ramadan and for women to dress modestly, especially by wearing a headscarf. As soon as the nonbelievers refuse, discrimination, social exclusion and threats follow, because many Muslims believe that people who turn their backs on Islam should be killed. This is especially difficult when they have to live all day and night in an apartment with practising Muslims, who, for example, get up around 5 a.m. every morning and wake their sleeping irreligious roommates with their Islamic dawn prayer.

The AZC leadership, the COA ('Central Organ for taking in Asylum seekers') and the police often show little understanding for the situation of nonreligious refugees in camps, and regularly request them to be quiet about their disbelief, or to pretend to be Muslim. The refugees think that, as they are in the Netherlands, they should not have to deal with such a situation. They testify about their experiences before a Commission of the Dutch House of Representatives.

Boris van der Ham, president of the Dutch Humanist Association, conducts conversations with them about what should be done about the situation. He also takes them on a visit to the Amsterdam City Archives, where they read documents about the Dutch Enlightenment philosopher Baruch Spinoza (1632–1677), who was evicted from the Jewish community in 1656 because of his lack of faith.

== Cast ==
- Ayman Ghoujal (from Syria)
- Fauzia Ilyas (from Pakistan)
- Javeed (from Afghanistan)
- Marina (from Afghanistan)
- Saikat (from Bangladesh)
- S(a)yed Gillani (from Pakistan)
- Boris van der Ham (president Dutch Humanist Association)

== See also ==
- Islam's Non-Believers
