= Islam's Non-Believers =

2016 documentary directed by Deeyah Khan

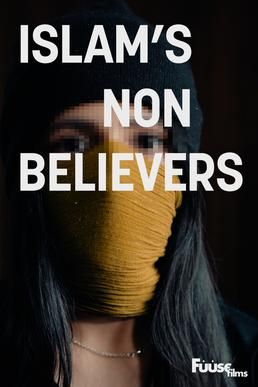
- Directed by: Deeyah Khan
- Starring: Nadia El Fani (from Tunisia); Sadia Hameed (from Britain); Imad Iddine Habib (from Morocco); Fauzia Ilyas (from Pakistan); Maryam Namazie (from Iran); Arif(ur) Rahman (from Bangladesh); Rayhana Sultan (from Bangladesh); Usama al-Binni (from Jordan)
- Countries of origin: United Kingdom, Norway
- Original language: English

Production
- Producers: Deeyah; Darin Prindle; Andrew Smith
- Cinematography: Deeyah Khan; Darin Prindle; Julie Tørrissen
- Editors: Kevin Thomas; Michael Ho
- Running time: 49 minutes

Original release
- Network: ITV
- Release: 13 October 2016

Islam's Non-Believers is a 2016 documentary produced by Fuuse Films, and filmed and directed by Deeyah Khan. The film documents the lives and experiences of ex-Muslims: people who have left Islam to become atheists, and who often face discrimination, harassment, ostracism and violence for leaving Islam, both in the UK and abroad. The documentary was first shown on the ITV's current affairs series Exposure.

== Synopsis ==
Panel discussion about Islam's Non-Believers with Kahn, Ilyas, Hameed, Habib and others (2017)

Islam’s Non Believers explores the experiences of ex-Muslims worldwide through following the work of Council of Ex-Muslims of Britain, a support and campaigning group founded by Iranian-born human rights activist Maryam Namazie.

The film portrays dangers and difficulties faced by people who have renounced Islam. Interviewees, several of whom appear incognito, talk about the risks of suicide and self-harm, and the experiences of physical and psychological abuse from family members. Many are terrified of being shunned or abused if their beliefs were to become known to their families and communities. The film shows that many young British ex-Muslims hide their true beliefs, running huge risks if they 'come out' as atheists within their communities.

The documentary also states that the danger for ex-Muslims who live in Muslim-majority countries can be higher. Apostasy from Islam carries the death penalty in many countries. Atheists may face persecution by their own governments, and the risk of violence at the hands of extremist gangs.

Special attention is given to the situation of atheist and secularist activists (writers, bloggers, publishers, scientists) in Bangladesh, where public machete attacks by Islamic extremists have claimed dozens of lives since 2013, and large public protests in Bangladesh and in the Bangladeshi community in London have called for atheists and apostates to be killed.

== Cast ==
- Bonya Ahmed (from Bangladesh)
- Nadia El Fani (from Tunisia)
- Sadia Hameed (from Britain)
- Imad Iddine Habib (from Morocco)
- Fauzia Ilyas (from Pakistan)
- Maryam Namazie (from Iran)
- Arif(ur) Rahman (from Bangladesh)
- Rayhana Sultan (from Bangladesh)
- Usama al-Binni (from Jordan)
- "Safiyya" (pseudonym)
- "Sameera" (pseudonym)
- "Zainab" (pseudonym)
- Several unidentified ex-Muslims from around the world were interviewed using videotelephony.
- Omer El-Hamdoon, president of the Muslim Association of Britain, was also interviewed to give a Muslim perspective on ex-Muslims.

== Reception ==
Writing for The Guardian, Jonathan Wright labeled the documentary "austere", and the part about Bangladesh "especially disturbing", and that it makes clear that many apostates require support after leaving Islam. Spiked writer Hardeep Singh called the film "excellent", strongly recommending it to anyone "left with any doubt about the courage required to come out as an ex-Muslim", whom he considered to be "among the most courageous people living in Britain today".

On 23 July 2017, director Deeyah Khan received an Award from the Council of Ex-Muslims of Britain for raising awareness about the fate of ex-Muslims. Namazie thanked her for making a film on this taboo subject, and although Khan is a Muslim herself, she was seen as a friend and ally of the CEMB. Khan herself was not present at the award ceremony, so Sadia Hameed, who featured prominently in the film, accepted the prize on her behalf, and explained why the film was so important for her and others sharing her fate: "Ex-Muslims, atheists, freethinkers, we've all been persecuted throughout history, in all periods. We were nameless and faceless and voiceless. Deeyah gave us a voice, she gave us a face, she made us human again."

== See also ==
- Among Nonbelievers (2015)
- Non-believers: Freethinkers on the Run (2016)
