= Maryam Namazie =

Iranian human rights activist, broadcaster

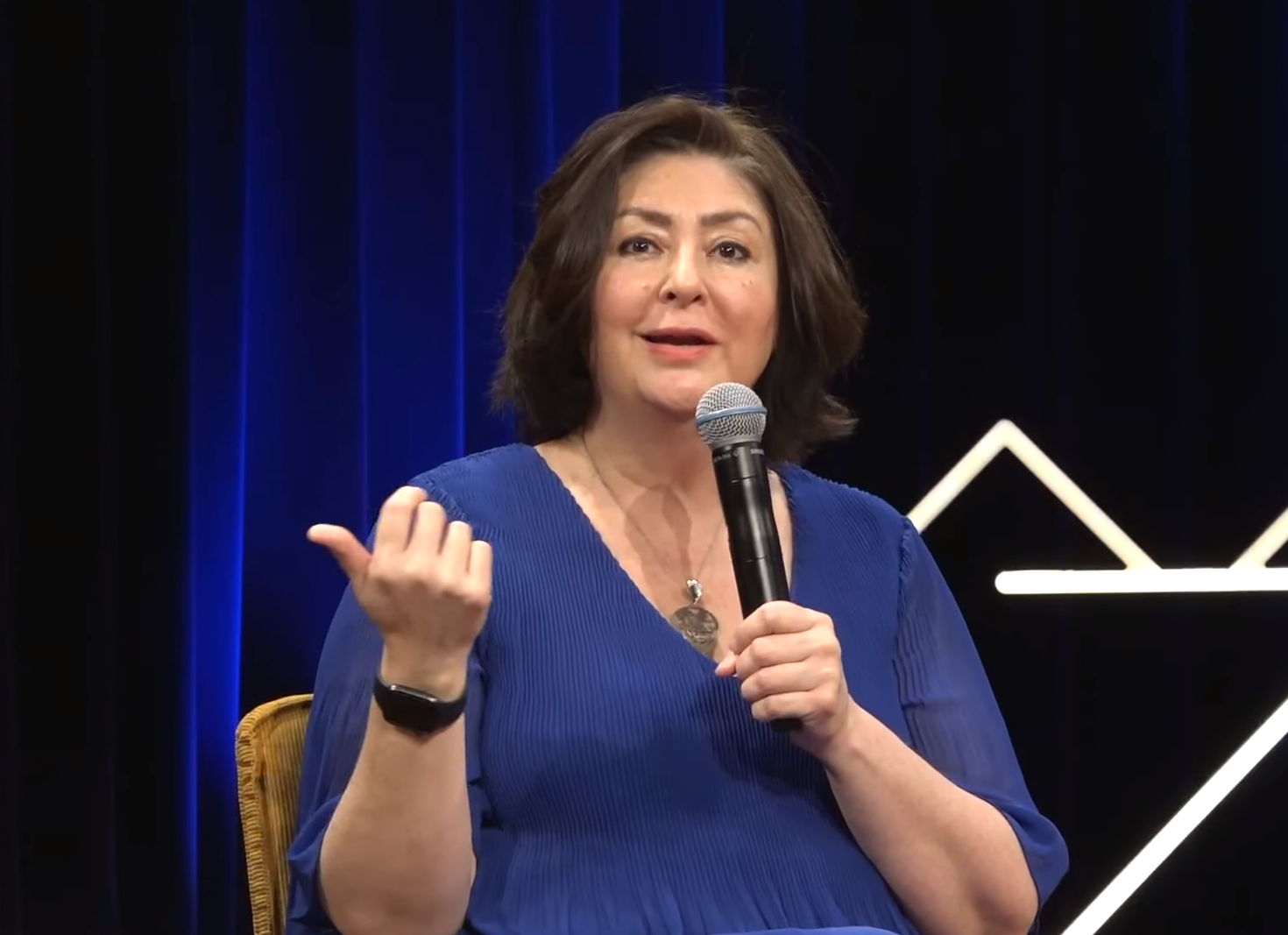
- Namazie on a 2021 discussion panel in De Balie in Amsterdam
- Born: May 1966 (age 60); Tehran, Iran
- Occupation: Human rights activist
- Organization: Council of Ex-Muslims of Britain

Maryam Namazie (Persian: مریم نمازی; born 1966) is a British-Iranian secularist, communist and human rights activist, commentator, and broadcaster. She is the Spokesperson for Fitnah – Movement for Women’s Liberation, One Law for All and the Council of Ex-Muslims of Britain. She is known for speaking out against Islam and Islamism and defending the right to apostasy and blasphemy.

== Early life ==
Namazie was born in Tehran to Hushang and Mary Namazie, but left with her family in 1980 after the 1979 revolution in Iran. She has subsequently lived in India, the United Kingdom, and the United States, where she began her university at the age of 17.

Most of her early work focused on refugee rights, especially in Sudan, Turkey, and Iran, and she has actively campaigned against sharia law. Namazie became well known in the mid-2000s for her pro-secularism positions and her critique of the treatment of women under Islamic regimes. In 2015, her lectures were opposed by groups labeling her as too provocative.

== Work with immigrants ==
Namazie first worked with Ethiopian refugees in Sudan. After a 1989 military coup when Islamic law was instituted in Sudan, her clandestine organisation in defence of human rights, Human Rights Without Frontiers, was discovered and she was threatened by Sudanese security and had to leave the country. Back in the United States in 1990 she became the Founder of the Committee for Humanitarian Assistance to Iranian Refugees (CHAIR). In 1994 she worked with Iranian refugees in Turkey and produced a film about their situation. Namazie was then elected Executive Director of the International Federation of Iranian Refugees with branches in more than 20 countries. She has led several campaigns, especially against human rights violations of refugees in Turkey. He has also broadcast programmes via satellite television in English: TV International.

== Activism ==
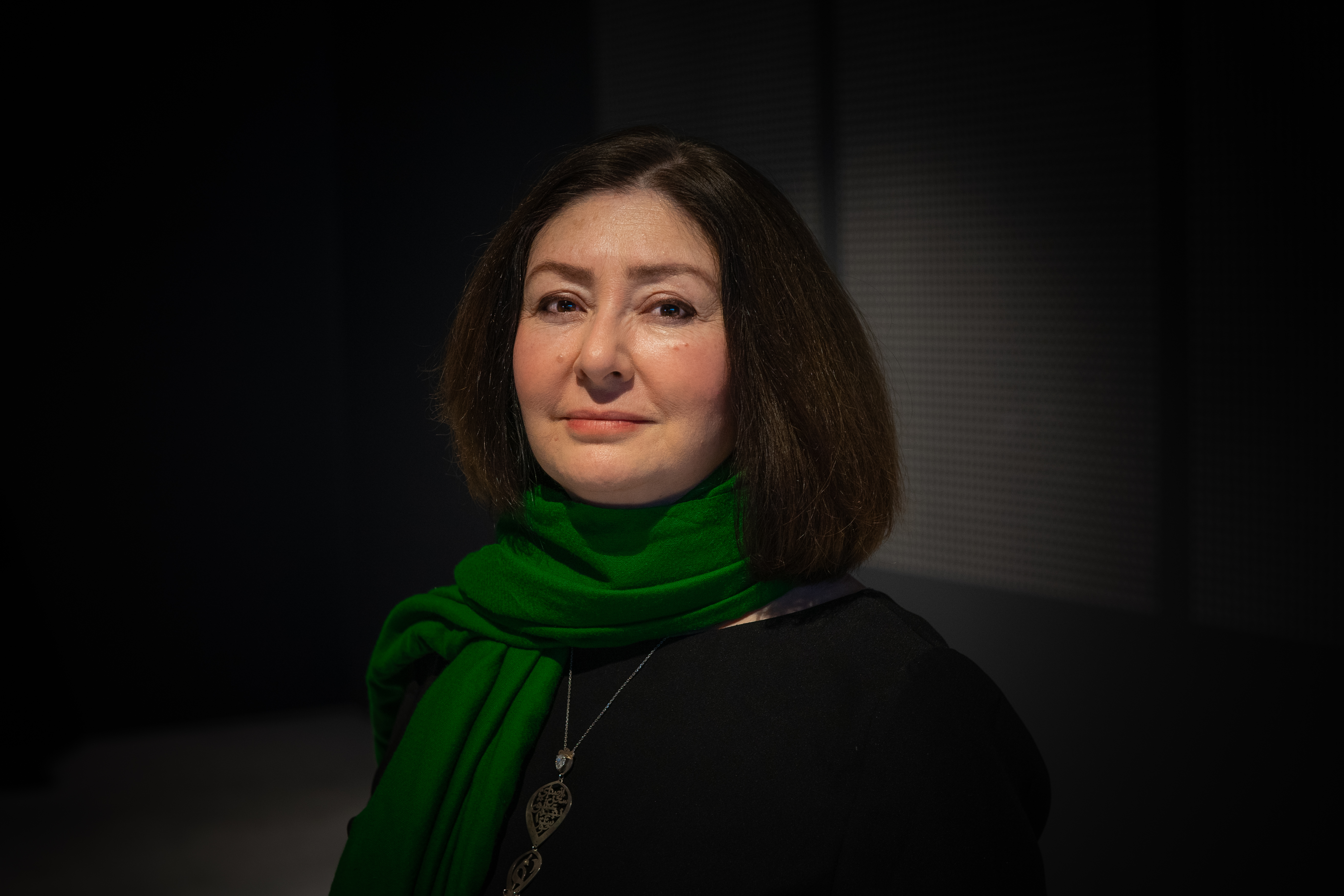
Maryam Namazie in an atheist conference in Oslo, arranged by Ateistene and Norwegian Humanist Association, 2019.

Namazie has had campaigned for secularism, and had criticized Islam in Iran and internationally including in Canada and Britain, where she currently lives. In numerous articles and public statements she has challenged cultural relativism and political Islam. These activities were recognised by the National Secular Society with the 2005 Secularist of the Year award, making her its first recipient.

During the Danish cartoon riots, she was one of the twelve signatories of Manifesto: Together Facing the New Totalitarianism together with Ayaan Hirsi Ali, Chahla Chafiq, Caroline Fourest, Bernard-Henri Lévy, Irshad Manji, Mehdi Mozaffari, Taslima Nasreen, Salman Rushdie, Antoine Sfeir, Philippe Val, and Ibn Warraq. The manifesto begins thus: "After having overcome fascism, Nazism, and Stalinism, the world now faces a new totalitarian global threat: Islamism." Namazie said in a 2006 interview that the response by the public "has been overwhelming. Many feel such a manifesto is extremely timely whilst of course there is the usual hate mail from Islamists."

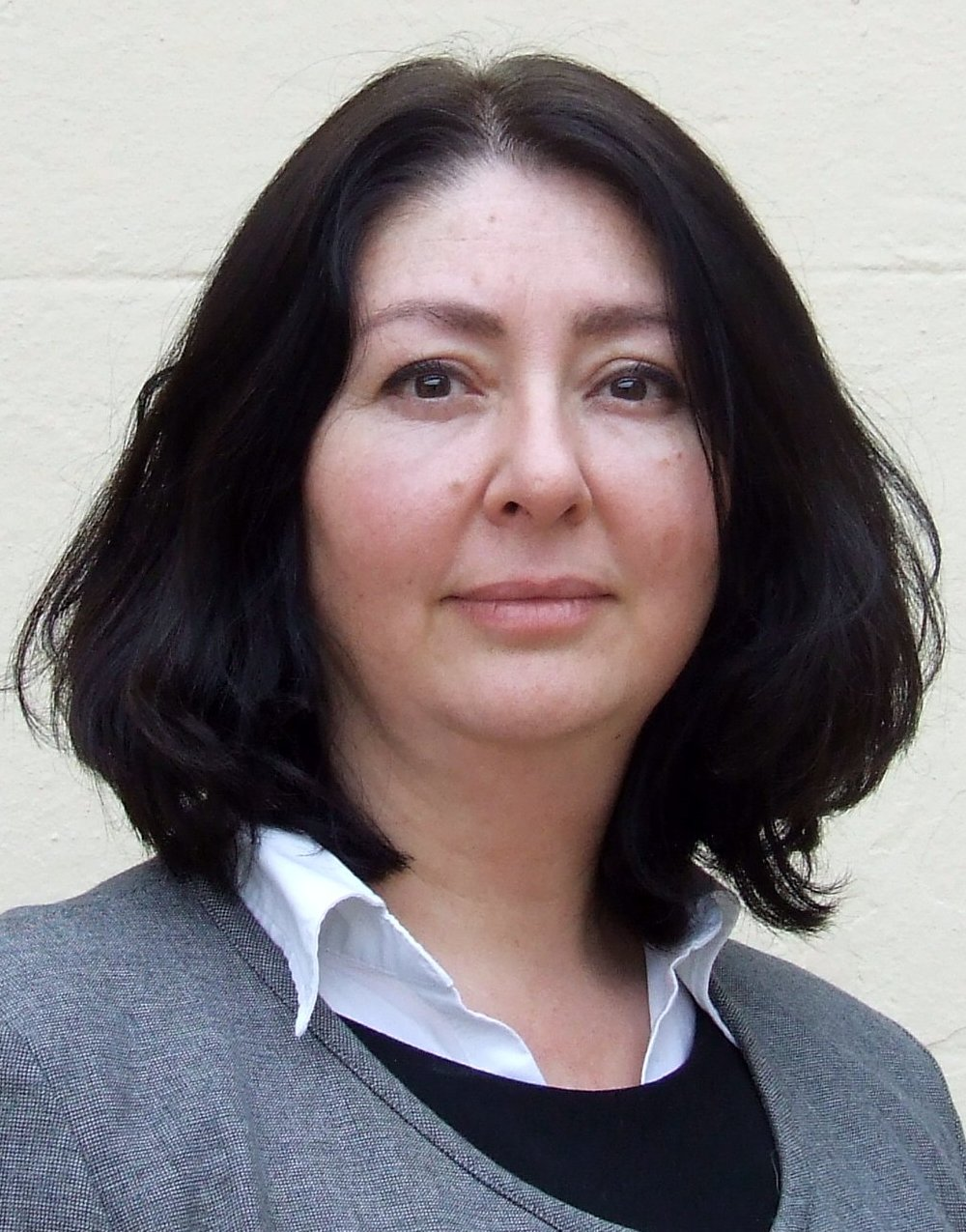
Maryam Namazie, 2012

Namazie believes Britain should ban the niqab, and women under 18 should be banned from wearing the hijab.

Namazie was also the spokesman of Fitnah- Movement for Women's Liberation, a protest movement which is, according to their website, "demanding freedom, equality, and secularism and calling for an end to misogynist cultural, religious, and moral laws and customs, compulsory veiling, sex apartheid, sex trafficking, and violence against women." Namazie says that the name of the movement "fitna", is in defiance of the Islamic prophet Muhammad who, Namazie says, portrays women as a source of harm and affliction in a hadith. She explains that even though the term is generally perceived as negative, the fact that women who are called fitnah are those who "are disobedient, who transgress the norms, who refuse, who resist, who revolt, who won't submit" makes it suited for a women's liberation movement. She has explained that the creation of the movement was sparked by contemporary movements and revolutions around the world, especially those in the Middle East and North Africa, although she emphasizes Fitnah has global relevance.

Namazie has denounced the discrimination women have to endure under the Islamic regime: "From the very fact that you are a second-class citizen, even your testimony legally is worth half that of a man's, you get half what a boy does in inheritance if you are a girl. You have to be veiled if you're a girl or a woman, and there are certain fields of education or work that are closed to you because you're considered emotional." She compares women's situation under Islamic regimes today to the social inequalities under apartheid in South Africa, and she cites as examples the existence of separate entrances for women into government offices and the separation of men and women on swimming areas in the Caspian Sea by a curtain.

After Mina Ahadi launched the Central Council of Ex-Muslims in Germany in January 2007, Namazie became the co-founder of the Council of Ex-Muslims of Britain (CEMB) in June, and was involved in the founding of the Dutch branch in September: the Central Committee for Ex-Muslims, an initiative of Ehsan Jami. The representatives of the three ex-Muslim councils signed a "European Declaration of Tolerance". The rise of ex-Muslim organisations have been described by MEP Sophie in 't Veld as a "new Renaissance"; Namazie herself compared the breaking of taboos and the 'coming out' of Muslim apostates with the emancipation of homosexuals.

In February 2008, Namazie and Ahadi were selected among of the top 45 "Women of the Year 2007" by Elle Quebec for their role in the foundation of the ex-Muslim councils. Though the Dutch Committee for Ex-Muslims was dissolved in 2008, its British and German counterparts were reinforced with a French branch: by the initiative of Waleed Al-Husseini the Council of Ex-Muslims of France was founded on 6 July 2013, in which Namazie was again involved.

Namazie was named in Victims of Intimidation: Freedom of Speech within Europe's Muslim Communities, a late 2008 report about 27 European public figures with an Islamic background that have been made the focus of terrorist attention on the basis of what they have said about issues such Islam, homosexuality or religious experience.

Since 1982, there has been an Islamic Sharia Council in the United Kingdom, and Islamic sharia courts are allowed to adjudicate in familial matters (marriage, divorce, inheritance, custody of children) according to the Arbitration Act 1996. Namazie campaigns against these issues under the name One law for all. She deems sharia law is discriminatory and unjust, especially against women and children: "Rights and justice are meant for people, not for religions and cultures", said Namazie. The action was launched on 10 December 2008 during the 60th anniversary of the Universal Declaration of Human Rights.

Namazie has also spoken against cultural relativism in regards to human rights and equality, denouncing the fact that cultural relativism disregards violations of human rights and the oppression of women in countries ruled by Islamists, under the excuse that these actions are part of the culture of the countries where they occur. She has also pointed out that she believes the greatest opponents of sharia law and Islamism are precisely people who have lived under its rule, and that no one should have lesser rights for having been born in the place where they were born.

On 15 September 2010, Namazie, along with 54 other public figures, signed an open letter published in The Guardian, stating their opposition to Pope Benedict XVI's state visit to the UK.

Namazie opening the 2014 Secular Conference in London

Namazie was keynote speaker at the World Atheist Convention 2011 in Dublin, where she stated that there is currently an "Islamic Inquisition" going on; that labeling people and countries as being first and foremost 'Islamic' or 'Muslim' denies the diversity of individuals and societies and gives Islamists more influence; that human rights are not 'Western' but universal; and that the word "Islamophobia" is wrong because it is not a form of racism, because fear of Islam and opposition against it is not unfounded, but even necessary. A similar speech she made in Salt Lake City at the 2014 American Atheists National Convention opposed the wearing of the veil.

After the gesture of the Egyptian blogger Aliaa Magda Elmahdy, who posted nude pictures of herself to provoke the Islamists, Namazie launched a calendar with pictures of naked female activists in February 2012, with among others the Ukrainian Alena Magela of the FEMEN group. Namazie said: ""Islamists and the religious right are obsessed with women's bodies. They want to silence us, to make us go veiled and chained through life. Nudity breaks taboos, and is an important means of resistance." She called Elmahdy's deed "a scream against Islamism" and "the ultimate act of rebellion". Namazie emphasizes the difference between Muslims on the one hand, believers like any other, and Islamists on the other, who are dangerous because they form repressive political movements that have seized power in some countries. She argues that all religious Right movements are the same fundamentally.

Namazie on celebrating apostasy and blasphemy, opening the International Conference on Free Expression and Conscience 2017

In September 2015, the students' union of Warwick University briefly banned her from a forthcoming talk on campus organised by the Warwick Atheists, Secularists and Humanists' Society because of a fear that she might "incite hatred" of the university's Muslim students. In an interview with the Coventry Telegraph's Simon Gilbert, she was quoted as saying: "It angers me that we're all put in a little box and that anyone who criticises Islam is labelled racist. It's not racist, it's a fundamental right. ... The Islamic movement is a movement that slaughters people in the Middle East and Africa. It's important for us to speak about it and criticise it." The ban was lifted after a few days.

In December 2015, she gave a talk about blasphemy at the Goldsmiths University in London, sponsored by the university's Atheist, Secularist and Humanist society. During her talk, members of the university's Islamic Society caused a disruption by heckling and switching off her PowerPoint presentation when Namazie displayed a cartoon from the series Jesus and Mo. Some of the students were alleged to have issued threats. In response to the incident, the university's Feminist Society released a statement on Tumblr, expressing support for the Islamic Society, and condemning the Atheist, Secularist and Humanist Society for hosting "known Islamophobes" to speak at the university.

Namazie is the spokesperson for One Law for All and the Council of Ex-Muslims of Britain. Namazie is an honorary associate of the National Secular Society, and a patron of Pink Triangle Trust. She is also involved with the International Committee against Stoning. In the past she used to be spokesperson for Iran Solidarity, and for Equal Rights Now - Organisation Against Women's Discrimination in Iran, that seeks to defend women's rights and the struggle against "sexual apartheid" in Iran.

== Politics ==
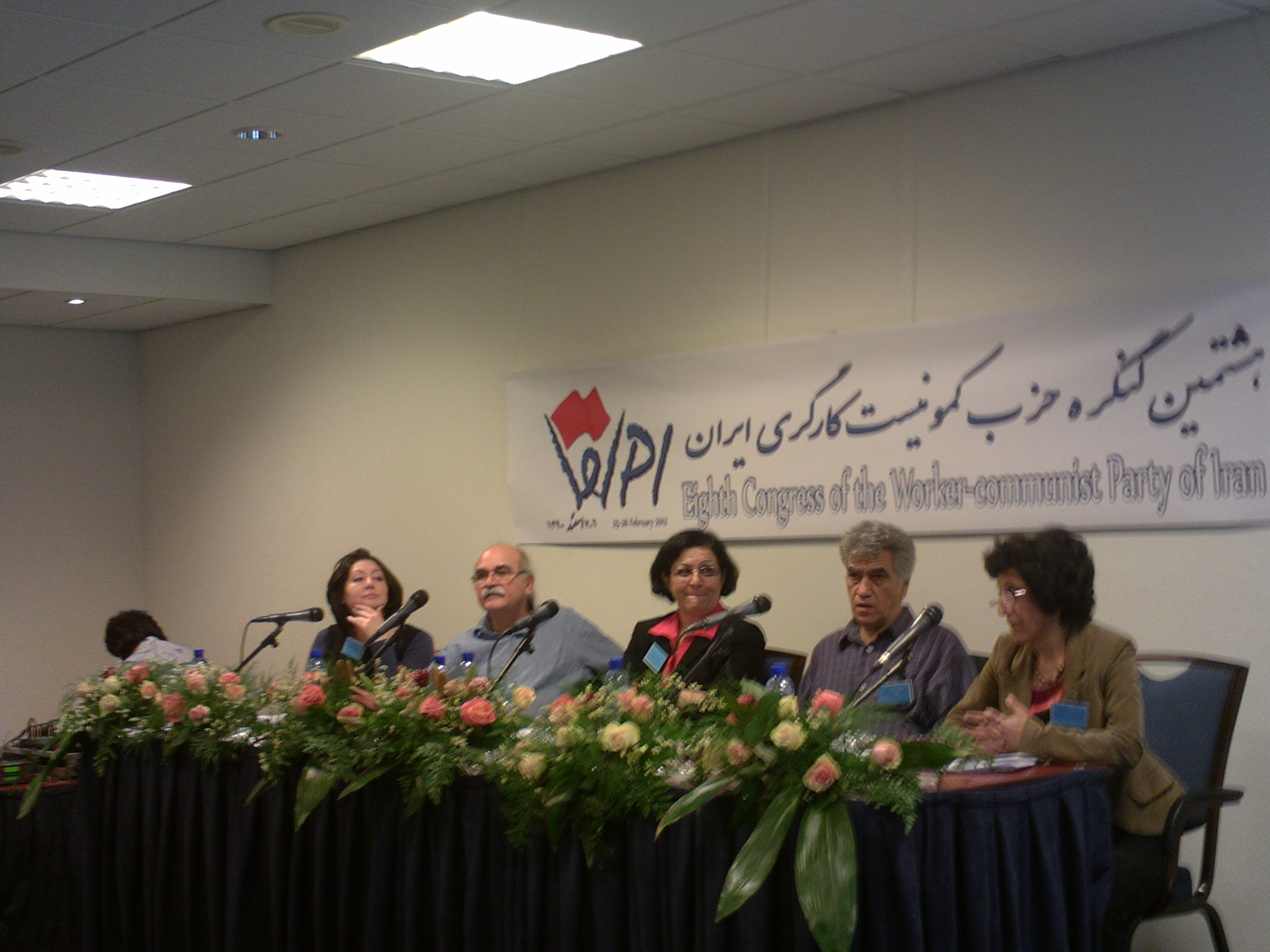
Namazie at the eighth WPI Congress

Maryam Namazie used to be a Central Committee member of the Worker-communist Party of Iran, as editor for the Worker-communist Review. She advocated ideas inspired by worker-communism, especially those of the Iranian theorist Mansoor Hekmat. Maryam Namazie and Fariborz Pooya resigned from membership of the Worker-communist Party of Iran on 1 January 2009. Central Committee secretary Hamid Taqvaie regretfully accepted their resignation, saying the party would 'continue to support [their] social activities and campaigns against political Islam', and expressed hope that Namazie and Pooya would continue to work on the Bread and Roses programme.

Namazie strongly distances herself from far-right anti-Islamic groups, whom she does not regard as allies, but enemies as well. At the World Atheist Conference in Dublin in 2011, referring to the far-right, she said "they are like the Islamists" and that Muslims need equal protection under the law, while she stressed the need to be able to criticize religion. She strongly condemned the far-right movements after the terrorist attacks on mosques in Christchurch, New Zealand, which took away 50 victims' lives, stating that "We stand with Muslims everywhere who face discrimination, violence and terror".

== Works ==
- Maryam Namazie, Sharia Law in Britain: A Threat to One Law for All and Equal Rights (2010). One Law For All.
- Adam Barnett & Maryam Namazie, Enemies Not Allies: The Far-Right (2011). One Law For All.
- Maryam Namazie, Nahla Mahmoud, Atoosa Khatiri e.a., Political and Legal Status of Apostates in Islam (2013). Council of Ex-Muslims of Britain.

== Documentaries ==
Namazie is featured in the following documentary films:

- Among Nonbelievers (2015), directed by Dorothée Forma, produced by HUMAN
- Islam's Non-Believers (2016), directed by Deeyah Khan, produced by Fuuse

== See also ==
- Mina Ahadi
- Criticism of Islam
- Pragna Patel
- List of Iranian women activists

== Bibliography ==
- Benn, Piers. Intellectual Freedom and the Culture Wars. Germany, Springer International Publishing, 2020.
