= Chahla Chafiq =

Iranian writer

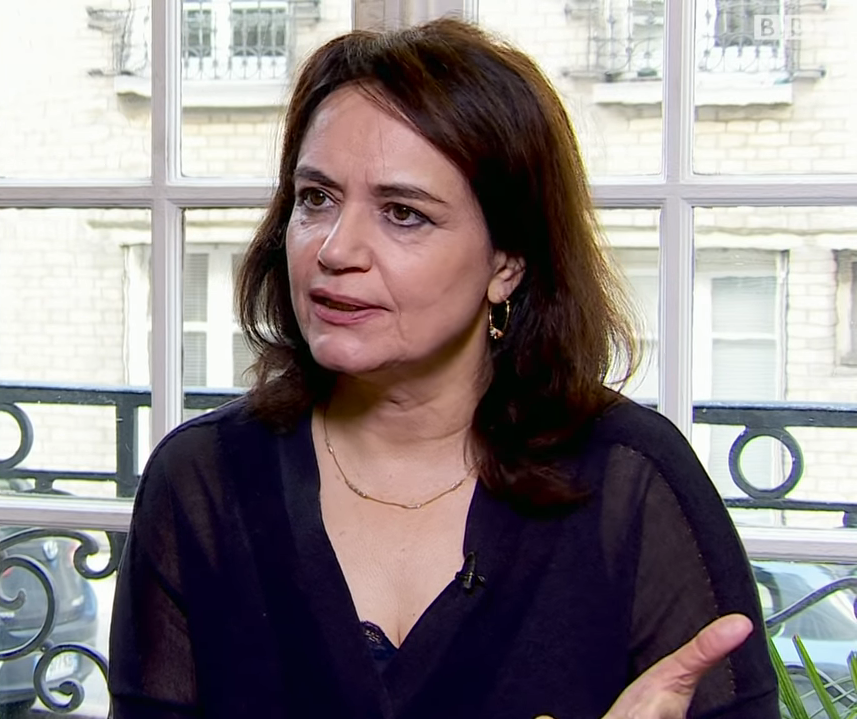
Chahla Chafiq on BBC Persian in 2019

Chahla Beski-Chafiq (Persian: شهلا بسکی شفیق Šahlâ Beski Šafiq; born Beski on May 5, 1954), better known by her pen name Chahla Chafiq, is an Iranian writer living in France. She has chosen the pen name "Chafiq" in honor of her mother, Shafiqeh ("compassionate").

As a leftist militant, in 1983 she left her country following the Islamic Revolution. She has published several essays about the treatment of women and the power of the ayatollahs in Iran. She was among the 12 signatories of "Manifesto: Together Facing The New Totalitarianism" in the aftermath of the Jyllands-Posten Muhammad cartoons controversy.

Alongside her writing activities, Chahla Chafiq has worked in the field of intercultural relations in France and, in 2003, she created the Agency for the development of intercultural relations for citizenship (French: Agence de développement des relations interculturelles pour la citoyenneté, ADRIC), which she directed until 2014. Two ADRIC guides have been published under her direction: "Faced with violence and discrimination: supporting women from immigrant backgrounds" and "Acting for secularism in a context of cultural diversity". These guides received the "European Year of Intercultural Dialogue" label in 2008. In 2009, she obtained a doctorate in sociology at Paris-Dauphine University.

From 2016 to 2019, she was a member of the High Council for Equality between Women and Men of the French Republic. In 2017, she received the insignia of Chevalier de la Légion d'honneur. The same year, she was honored by the Iranian Women's Studies Foundation as the "Woman of the Year". In 2018, she received the Rationalist Union Prize for her contributions to the development of critical thinking. In 2021, she was made Officier de l'Ordre national du Mérite.

== Writings ==
In French

- La femme et le retour de l'islam, Éditions du Félin, 1991
- Femmes sous le voile : face à la loi islamique (with Farhad Khosrokhavar), Éditions du Félin, 1995
- Le nouvel homme islamiste : la prison politique en Iran, Éditions du Félin, 2002
- Chemins et brouillard, Éditions Métropolis, 2005
- Islamisme et société : religieux, politique, sexe et genre à la lumière de l'expérience iranienne, 2009 [thesis]
- Islam, politique, sexe et genre, Presses universitaires de France, 2011
- Demande au miroir, Éditions L'Âge d'Homme, 2015
- Le Rendez-vous iranien de Simone de Beauvoir, Editions iXe, 2019

In Persian

- Sug (The mourning) (2000), a collection of connected short stories that recount the experiences and emotions of a couple that tries to come to terms with the death of their teenage daughter
