= Sabatina James =

Austrian-Pakistani humanitarian and writer (born 1984)

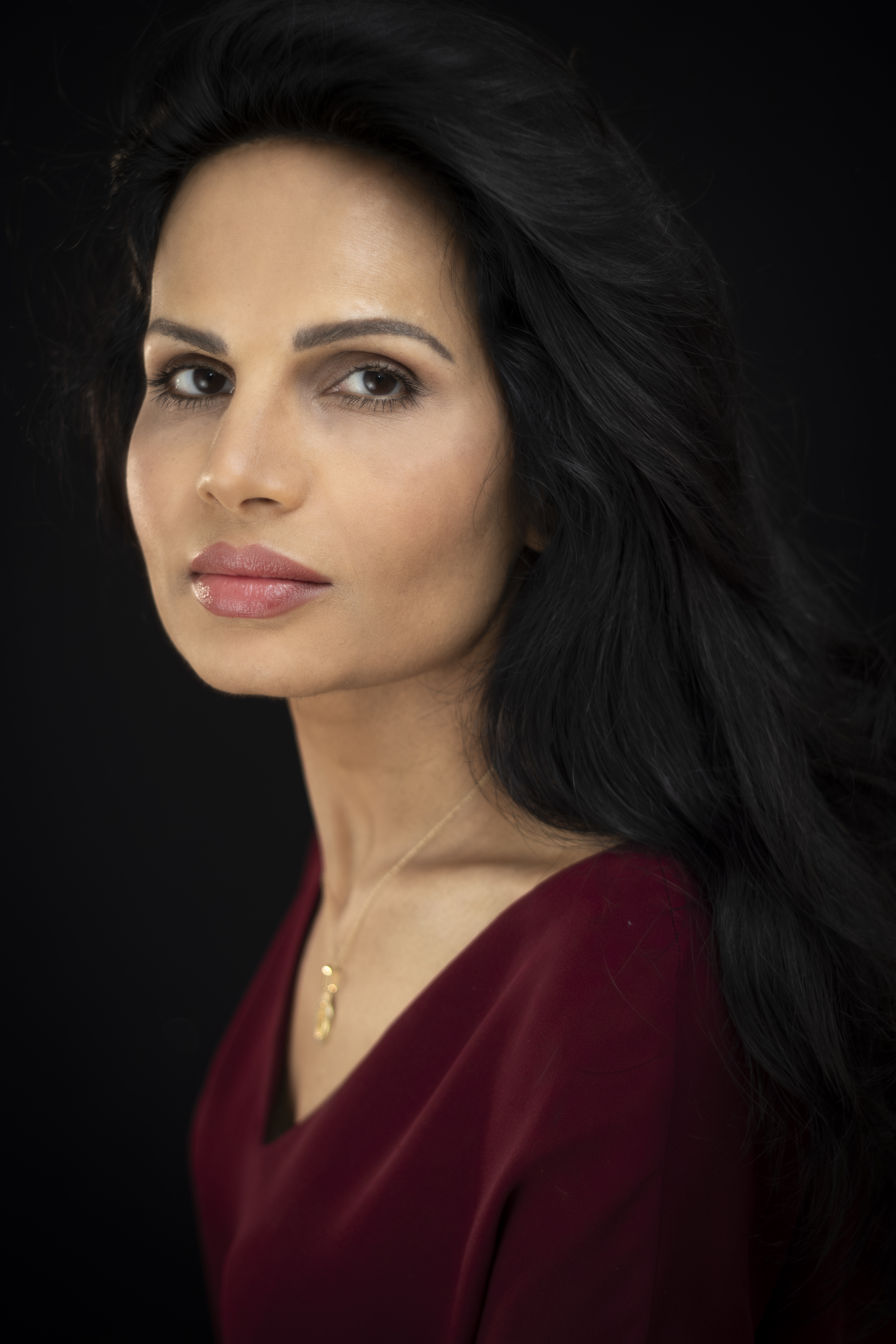
- Sabatina James in 2024
- Born: November 1984 (age 41–42); Dhadar, Pakistan
- Occupation: Humanitarian
- Known for: Sabatina e.V. (Friends of the Passion)
- Notable work: Sterben sollst du für dein Glück (2003); Scharia in Deutschland – Wenn die Gesetze des Islam das Recht brechen (2015); The Price of Love (2025)

Sabatina James (born November 1984) is the pseudonym of an Austrian Pakistani humanitarian, author and founder of Sabatina e.V. (Friends of the Passion), a non profit organisation based in Germany. She is known for her human rights advocacy, especially for rescuing persecuted Christians in Pakistan and helping Muslim girls in Germany to flee from forced marriage and honour killings.

== Escape ==
She survived by sleeping in a youth homeless shelter and working at a local café in Linz. Her parents harassed her at both places, showing up and ordering her to wed. Sabatina escaped to Vienna with the help of friends. There she started a new life, changed her name and was baptized Catholic in 2003. She wrote a book about this experience, and her parents sued for defamation of character. However, the court ruled in her favor. The German police took her into the victim protection program. In 2006 she established Sabatina e.V. (Friends of the Passion) in Hamburg to help victims of forced marriage and Christians persecuted for their faith. A prominent debater, she rose to fame by appearing in several leading Austrian and German TV Shows. In a feature story, the German Spiegel Magazine called her "God's Supermodel".

== Career ==
Since 2006, her organization has fought for victims of honour violence and persecuted Christians in Pakistan.

In 2010, she received the "Filippas Engel" Youth Prize by Princess Gabriela zu Sayn Wittgenstein and the Ingrid zu Solms Human Rights Award in Frankfurt.

In 2012, she took part in the international counter-jihad conference in the European Parliament in Brussels, billed as the "International Conference for Free Speech & Human Rights".

In 2014, at the Look! Gala in Vienna, she was honored as "Woman of the year" to spotlight her outstanding achievement for human rights.

== Works ==
- James, Sabatina (2003). Sabatina: Vom Islam zum Christentum - ein Todesurteil (in German). St. Andrä-Wördern: Kleindienst. ISBN 3-9501151-8-8. OCLC 314489100.
- James, Sabatina (2004). Sterben sollst du für dein Glück gefangen zwischen zwei Welten (in German). München. ISBN 978-3-426-77754-1. OCLC 76611134.
- James, Sabatina (2015). Scharia in Deutschland? wenn die Gesetze des Islam das Recht brechen (in German). München. ISBN 978-3-426-78680-2. OCLC 897524504.
- James, Sabatina (2017). Nur die Wahrheit macht uns frei mein Leben zwischen Islam und Christentum (in German). München: Knaur Taschenbuch. ISBN 978-3-426-78540-9. OCLC 964394909.
- James, Sabatina (2025). The Price of Love: The Fate of a Woman—and a Warning to the West. Manchester, NH: Sophia Institute Press. ISBN 979-8-88911-496-3.
