= Mardjan Seighali =

Iranian-Dutch activist

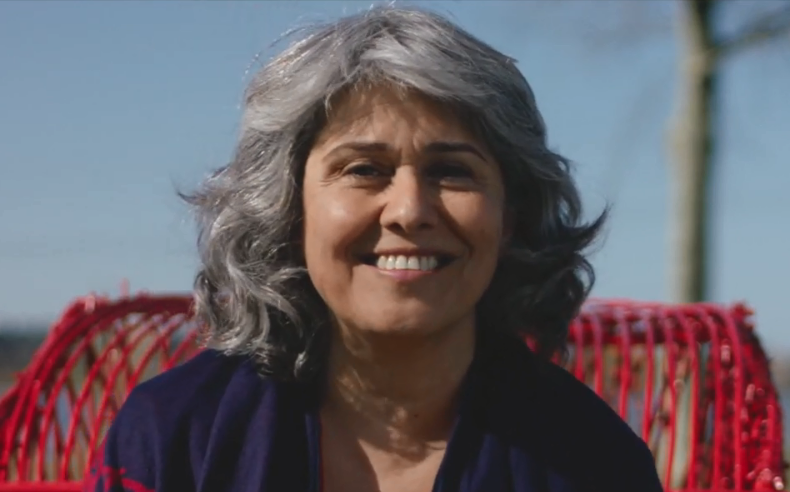
- Seighali in 2019
- Born: Mardjan Seighali; 1964 (age 61–62); Rasht, Iran
- Education: Social work at Hogeschool van Amsterdam
- Occupations: Director of Stichting voor Vluchteling Studenten UAF, President of Humanistisch Verbond
- Children: 2

Mardjan Seighali (born 1964) is an Iranian-born Dutch human rights activist, refugee worker and non-profit director. In 2013 Seighali became director of the Stichting voor Vluchteling Studenten UAF (Refugee Students Foundation). She serves on the Advisory Board of the College voor de Rechten van de Mens, and a member of the Supervisory Board of Het Loo Palace.

== Biography ==
=== Youth ===
Mardjan Seighali was born in 1964 in the northern Iranian city of Rasht on the Caspian Sea. Until the outbreak of the Iranian Revolution in 1978, Seighali had a protected family life, but the fall of the Shah inspired her to take an interest in politics.

=== Adult life in Iran ===
After the Revolution was hijacked by Islamists in 1979, Seighali joined a progressive party to fight for freedom and equal opportunities. She distributed pamphlets and attended meetings where she participated in discussions. Because of these oppositional political activities, she had to go in hiding for a few months at her aunt's home in Tehran when she was 17 years old; however, there was little she could do in daily life because she had to remain out of sight. Eventually she was able to persuade her father to let her celebrate Nowruz together in her parental home, but on the day of her arrival in 1982 she was arrested in her sleep, after which she was imprisoned for 1.5 years. She has said she experienced extreme fear every day, she was tortured, and several women with whom she was imprisoned were executed. Despite all the torture, she managed to not let her will be broken.

Seighali was eventually released after her parents made a deal with the regime, in which they paid a heavy ransom, she was forced to marry and was henceforth banned from studying and working. Seighali was furious that she had had no say in this decision, and that she now had to live a life dedicated to making other people happy; she herself was (initially) not happy at all. Her parents refused to discuss the deal with her, and she was not allowed to tell them about what she had been through in prison; it was painful for everyone involved. After some resistance, on 8 December 1983 she eventually married Rasul, a friend of hers of several years, even though she was not ready for marriage at all yet. It took several years before they developed true love for each other, and eventually had two sons.

=== Flight to the Netherlands ===
Freedom Interview with Seighali for Liberation Day 2019

In 1989, Rasul as cameraman secretly filmed an execution with the intention of smuggling the footage out of the country, but he was caught, had to immediately flee abroad, and ended up in the Netherlands. The regime soon confiscated their house, and Seighali and her children had to move back with her parents. She was then arrested several times and released again shortly after as an act of intimidation. Seighali made several failed attempts and fleeing the country. After 21 June 1990 Manjil–Rudbar earthquake hit Rasht, Rasul restored contact with Seighali via her aunt, revealed to her with a subtle hint that he was in the Netherlands, and gave her his phone number. Shortly thereafter, with the help of a migrant smuggler, she succeeded in fleeing to the Netherlands with her children on an aeroplane. After arriving in Breda, she applied for asylum, and first ended up in refugee camp AZC Blitterwijck near Venray; later she moved to Brummen and finally Almere.

=== Life in the Netherlands ===
Having arrived in the Netherlands, Seighali first learnt Dutch all by herself, and then began studying, which she had been barred from doing in Iran. She eventually became very happy with her new life in the Netherlands, where she feels at home, a free and strong woman. She overcame her homesickness, but she remained in correspondence with her family in Iran.

In 1997 she completed her social work and services studies at the Hogeschool van Amsterdam, and subsequently followed several post-bachelor courses. From 1996 to 2013 Seighali worked in youth services as a manager, in rehabilitation and at heritage foundation Erfgoed Nederland.

In 2013 Seighali became director of the Stichting voor Vluchteling Studenten UAF (Refugee Students Foundation). In June 2016 she entered the Advisory Board of the College voor de Rechten van de Mens, an independent supervisor for human rights issues in the Netherlands. She is also a member of the Supervisory Board of Het Loo Palace. In 2019 Seighali won the Comeniusprijs, an award for "eye-catching commitment to the interests of training, education, science and culture for the development of international society". According to the jury, she was an "enthusiastic inspirator in society who knows how to connect and support people so that they can push their own boundaries in society". On 21 November 2020 Seighali became president of the Humanistisch Verbond (Dutch Humanist Association). In the period from January 1st to September 1st, 2023, she served as the head of the Natuurstad Rotterdam Foundation.

== Awards ==
- 2019: Comeniusprijs

== Works ==
- Tot op de dag (2021)
