= Boris van der Ham =

Dutch politician and actor

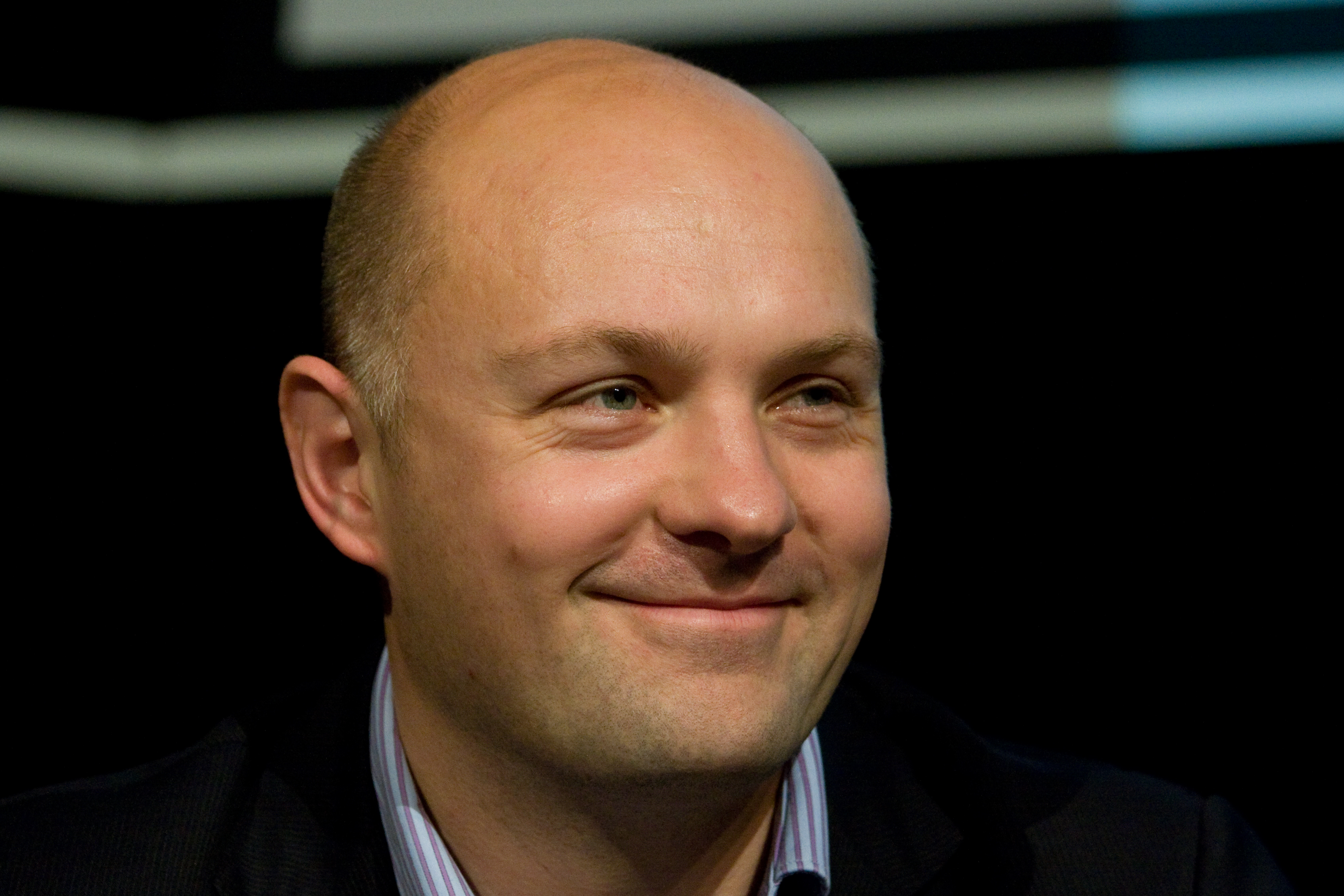

Member of the House of Representatives
- In office 23 May 2002 – 19 September 2012

Personal details
- Born: Boris van der Ham; 29 August 1973 (age 53) Amsterdam, Netherlands
- Party: Democrats 66
- Education: Maastricht Academy of Dramatic Arts (BA)
- Occupation: Politician, actor, singer-songwriter, writer, chairman Dutch Humanists
- Website: (in Dutch) Boris van der Ham website (English) Boris van der Ham's voice Recorded November 2016

Boris van der Ham (born 29 August 1973) is a Dutch writer, humanist, former politician, and actor. On 23 May 2002, he became a member of the House of Representatives for the Democrats 66 (D66), a social liberal party. From 24 November 2012 to 21 November 2020, he was the president of the Humanistisch Verbond (Dutch Humanist Association).

== Personal life ==
Van der Ham was raised non-religious, though his parents were raised orthodox Protestant. Van der Ham is sympathetic to the Remonstranten, but calls himself an agnostic humanist. He is openly gay and father of a son and daughter.

== Member of Parliament ==
In May 2002, van der Ham was elected Member of Parliament. He was re-elected in 2003, 2006 and 2010 with preferential votes. Together with members of GroenLinks and the Labour Party he drafted the bill that led to the 2005 European Constitution referendum, the country's first referendum in two hundred years. He drafted several other successful bills, among others: the possibility to correct parliamentary bills by people-initiated referendums, an amendment to put equal rights for gays and persons with disabilities in the Constitution, a bill to abolish the ban on blasphemy, a bill to reform a ban on shopping on Sundays and a proposal to make the formation process of a new government more transparent. In November 2006, he also became deputy parliamentary leader of his party. He focused on matters of education, drug policy, culture, mass media, economic affairs, environment and energy, social equality, democracy, and freedom of speech. In 2007 he wrote a book Voortrekkers en Baanbrekers ("In the front row") about the role of the Netherlands in the European Union after the European Constitution referendum. In 2012 he published a book "The Morality of Freedom" ("De Vrije Moraal") about the history and dilemmas of permissive societies.

== Out of parliament ==
In his political afterlife he maintained a public figure. In 2014 he wrote the book De Koning Kun Je Niet Spelen ("You can't play the king") on both his acting and political work.

== Chairman of the Dutch Humanists ==
In November 2012 Van der Ham was elected chair of the Dutch Humanist Association. In this position he is focusing on issues of freedom of speech, education and solidarity with atheists and humanists in Muslim-majority countries. Since January 2010, he has maintained a weekly vlog on YouTube about freethinking, humanism and liberalism. On 9/11 2009 he produced his first English spoken "Freethoughtvlog" about the Ground 0 Mosque. He is also publishing English written blogs on his website. In 2015 he featured in the documentary Among Nonbelievers about the hardships of ex-Muslims, and spoke at the Human Rights Council in Geneva on the topic of blasphemy laws. In 2016, he featured in the follow-up documentary Non-believers: Freethinkers on the Run about the dismal situation of irreligious asylum seekers in Dutch refugee camps. In 2018 he published the book 'Nieuwe Vrijdenkers' ('New Freethinkers'). On 21 November 2020, he was succeeded by Mardjan Seighali.

== Acting career and music ==
After leaving office he played in several tv-productions, and in some theatreproductions. In 2016/2017, Van der Ham featured in the musical Ciske de Rat He did the voice-over of the Dutch version of 'The Secret Life of 4 year olds'. In 2018 he returned to the stage in the Dutch adaption of Kwame Kwei-Armah's play 'Beneatha's Place'. His acting work also includes television, like in Flikken Maastricht, Smeris and the Netflix-series Amsterdam Empire. In 2020 he released his debut album as a singer and writer. He did a tour with his music in 2021, and had released a second album in 2022, followed with a range of new singles. In 2021 and 2022 he played George Orwell in the adaption of '1984' from the New European Ensemble, both on film and stage.

== Books ==
- Voortrekkers en Baanbrekers (2007)
- De Vrije Moraal (2012 and 2020)
- De Koning Kun Je Niet Spelen (2014)
- Nieuwe Vrijdenkers (2018)

== Decorations ==
- In 2012 he was awarded Knight of the Order of Orange-Nassau by Queen Beatrix of the Netherlands.
- In 2018 he was awarded as ‘Freethinker of the year’ by the Dutch Freethinkers Association.
