= Humanistisch Verbond =

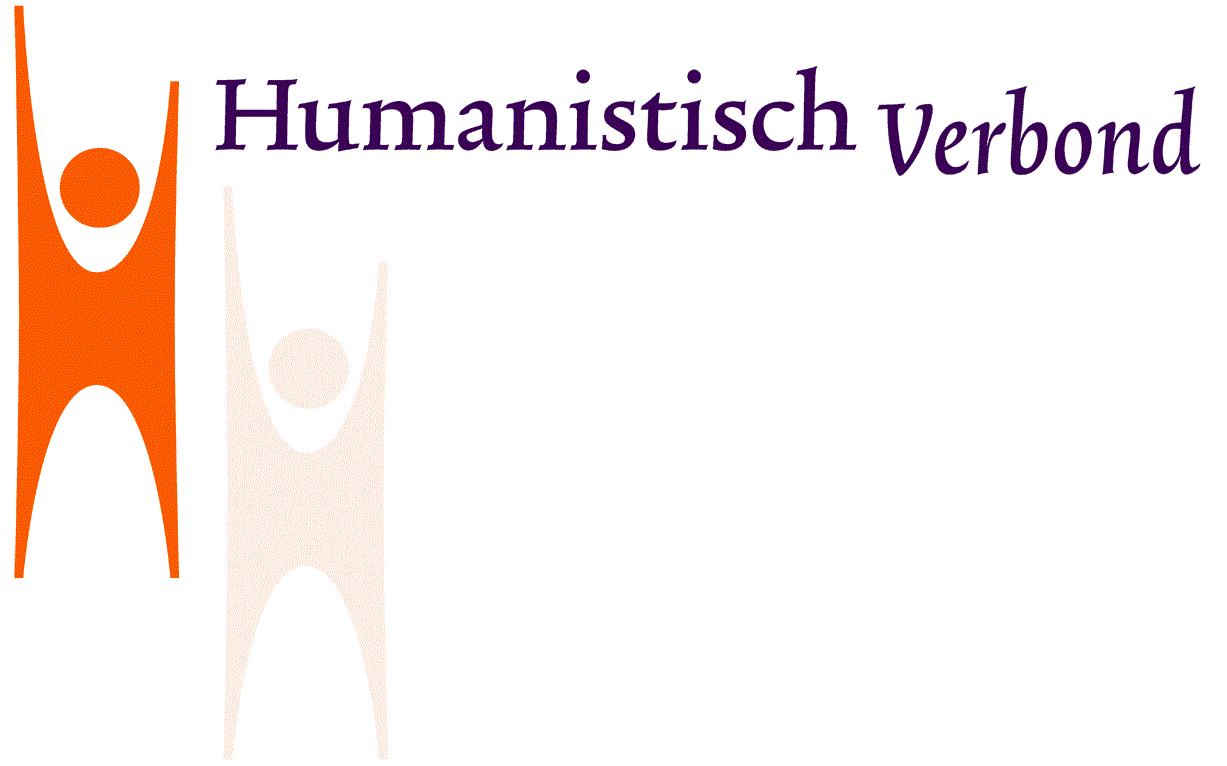
Logo.

The Humanistisch Verbond (HV; sometimes translated as Humanistic Association Netherlands, Dutch Humanist Association or Dutch Humanist League) is a Dutch association based on secular humanist principles.

== Basics ==
The foundation of the HV is that everyone is responsible for their own actions, but also has co-responsibility for the environment and others. The HV strives to spread and protect values such as self-determination, equal treatment and toleration. These have freedom of choice and personal responsibility at their core.

The HV uses slogans such as:

- Zelf denken, samen leven ("Thinking for yourself, living together")
- Het Humanistisch Verbond wil een inspiratiebron en ontmoetingsplaats zijn. Het behartigt tevens de belangen van mensen die zich in het humanisme herkennen ("The Humanistisch Verbond wants to be a source of inspiration and place to meet up. It also looks after the interests of people who identify with humanism") In 2022, the organisation stated that it had about 17,000 paying members, up from 13,000 in 2016

The services offered by the HV include speeches at funerals, humanist mental care and celebrating relationships.

== Netherlands ==
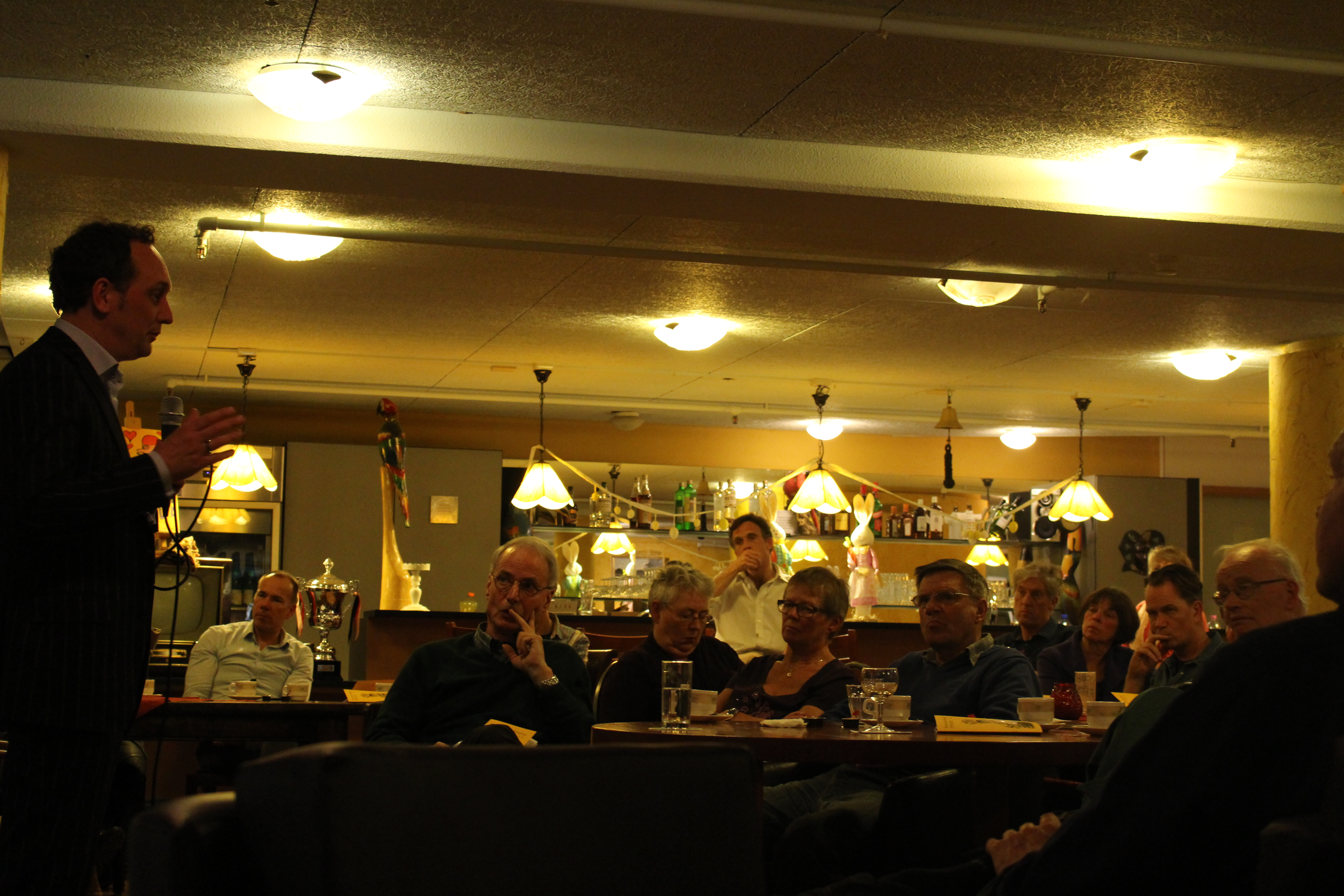
Ruard Ganzevoort at an HV event.

The Humanistisch Verbond (HV) was founded on 17 February 1946 as a response to 'spiritual nihilism' - that was held partially responsible for the atrocities of the Second World War - and the slighting of the non-religious in the Netherlands. The initiators were, amongst others, Jaap van Praag, Garmt Stuiveling and Jan Brandt Corstius. The widow of the prominent freethinker and humanist Leo Polak, Henriette Polak, was also closely involved in the foundation. The goal of the HV was uniting all humanists and deepening, spreading and defending the humanist worldview. Nowadays the HV focuses on the motto Zelf denken, samen leven ("Thinking for yourself, living together") to fulfilling two core tasks:

1. Formulating humanist perspectives to current worldview and personal questions;
2. Reinforcing and establishing humanist services, including humanist mental care, humanist funeral guidance and humanist formative education.

The Humanistisch Verbond is one of the founders of the Dutch humanist umbrella, the Humanistische Alliantie, and is member of the European Humanist Federation and International Humanist and Ethical Union.

== Chairs ==
Chair of the Humanistisch Verbond were:

- 1946: J. Hoetink
- 1946–1969 Jaap van Praag
- 1969–1977 Max Rood
- 1977–1987 Rob Tielman
- 1987–1993 Jan Glastra van Loon
- 1993–1995 Paul Cliteur
- 1996–1998 Marjan Verkerk
- 1998–2001 Liesbeth Mulder
- 2001–2003 Frits van Vugt
- 2003–2005 Roger van Boxtel
- 2005–2012 Rein Zunderdorp
- 2012–2020: Boris van der Ham
- 2020–present: Mardjan Seighali

== See also ==
- De Vrije Gedachte
- Non-believers: Freethinkers on the Run
