= Human (broadcaster) =

Dutch public broadcaster

HUMAN
- Type: Public broadcaster
- Country: Netherlands
- Availability: Netherlands
- Founded: 1989
- Parent: NPO
- Official website: human.nl

Human (stylised as HUMAN; earlier Humanistische Omroep and HOS: English: Humanist Broadcaster) is a special broadcaster on the Netherlands Public Broadcasting system, which is allowed to broadcast on radio and television because of their spiritual background. It was one of the "2.42 broadcasters" (named after the Article 2.42 of the Mediawet, the Dutch media law, which allowed faith-based broadcasters to get airtime on radio and TV without having to have any members). However, Human has been attempting to obtain a regular public broadcasting license, and attained the minimum number of members to be eligible to become an aspirant broadcaster as of 2014. As of 2022 it operates as a company within the Dutch Public Broadcasting system.

Human is known for broadcasting from a humanist perspective and has broadcast since 1989. Since 2001 Human is part of the Humanistische Alliantie (Humanist Alliance).

== Productions ==
Trailer of Among Nonbelievers.

- Among Nonbelievers (2015) by Dorothée Forma
- Non-believers: Freethinkers on the Run (2016) by Dorothée Forma

== See also ==
- De Vrije Gedachte
