= Council of Ex-Muslims of Britain =

British branch of the Central Council of Ex-Muslims

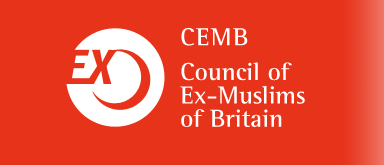
- Founded: 22 June 2007
- Purpose: Representing people who left Islam
- Location: London
- Region served: United Kingdom
- Key people: Maryam Namazie, Jimmy Bangash and Ali Malik
- Website: ex-muslim.org.uk

The Council of Ex-Muslims of Britain or CEMB (pronounced as see-em-BEE) is the British branch of the Central Council of Ex-Muslims. It was launched in Westminster on 22 June 2007.

== Manifesto ==
The CEMB in its manifesto states that its members do not desire to be "represented by regressive Islamic organisations and 'Muslim community leaders'". It says that by the choice of members to openly publish their names and photographs, they act as representatives of many other apostates who fear coming out in public due to death threats they expect to receive. The CEMB members state they are both breaking the taboo of quitting Islam and "taking a stand for reason, universal rights and values, and secularism".

The Council in its manifesto also demands several things such as freedom to criticise religion, separation of religion from the state and the "protection of children from manipulation and abuse by religion and religious institutions".

== History ==
The Council plans to protest against Islamic states that still punish Muslim apostates with death under the Sharia law, as prescribed by the scriptures of that religion. The council is led by Maryam Namazie, who was awarded Secularist of the Year in 2005 and has faced death threats.

The British Humanist Association and National Secular Society sponsored the launch and support the new organisation.

The activists of the organisation, many of whom are Iranian exiles, support the freedom to criticise religion and the end to what they call "religious intimidation and threats", Namazie says they have 4,000 users on their forum and assist around 350 people a year, "the majority of whom have faced threats for having left Islam – either by their families or by Islamists".

== Activities ==
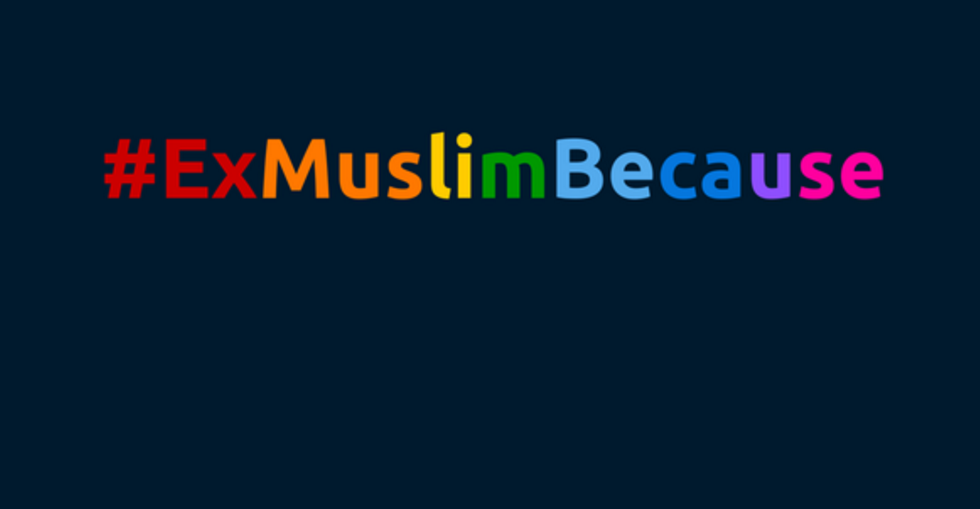
The #ExMuslimBecause campaign, late 2015

The CEMB seeks to provide a safe haven for ex-Muslims in trouble, raise awareness about the problems surrounding apostasy, blasphemy, homophobia, sexism and other forms of repression, intolerance and discrimination in Islam, organises and attends public protests and online campaigns for the human rights of ex-Muslims and other victims of Islamism, hosts a weekly television programme called Bread and Roses TV, and holds an annual Secular Conference.

=== #ExMuslimBecause ===
In November 2015, the CEMB launched the social media campaign #ExMuslimBecause, encouraging ex-Muslims to come out as apostates, and explain why they left Islam. Within two weeks, the hashtag had been used over 1,000 times. While proponents argued that it should be possible to freely question and criticise Islam, opponents claimed the campaign was amongst other things 'hateful'.

=== CEMB at Pride ===
CEMB at Pride 2017 marching for LGBT rights in Islamic states

On 8 July 2017, the CEMB took part in the Pride in London march for the first time in order to highlight the fact that 13 states under Islamic rule (14 if Daesh-held territories were included) impose the death penalty for homosexuality, and many of these also execute apostates and blasphemers if they criticise or leave the religion. Afterwards, the CEMB was the subject of a complaint from the orthodox East London Mosque (ELM) and others about CEMB's placards used during the march, with claims they were "Islamophobic" and "incited hate", in breach of Pride's guidelines. They specifically objected to one banner that suggested their Masjid incited murder - the placard read "East London Mosque incites murder of LGBT." Namazie responded that the term 'Islamophobia' is abused to conflate 'criticism of Islam or the political Islamic movement or Islamic State [with] bigotry and racism.' She stated that 'we’re obviously opposed to bigotry ourselves. We need to stand up to racism and bigotry and at the same time we should be able to criticise religion and the religious right.' 'Pride is full of ‘God is gay’ and ‘Jesus had two fathers’ placards as well as those mocking the church and priests and pope, yet hold a sign saying ‘Allah is gay’ – as we did – and the police converge to attempt to remove them for causing offence.' After a brief inquiry into the 'Allah is gay' placards, London police allowed the CEMB protesters to proceed. Pride in London organisers launched an investigation into the matter, with a spokesperson saying: "If anyone taking part in our parade makes someone feel ostracised, discriminated against or humiliated, then they are undermining and breaking the very principles on which we exist. Our code of conduct is very clear on this matter... We will not tolerate Islamophobia." The row escalated when Pride organisers published a statement in August along the same lines, and CEMB responded with a fierce statement criticising the policy of Pride organisers, whom they accused of 'a cultural relativism and tone policing that is only applicable to critics of Islam and never [to] critics of Christianity,' and '[buying] into the Islamist narrative that betrays the persecuted and defends the persecutors. This is a politics that rewards bullies and blames victims.' CEMB went on to highlight instances of homophobia committed by the East London Mosque, for which the mosque apologised and promised not to let it happen again. Peter Tatchell, co-organiser of the first Pride in London in 1972 and Patron of Pride in London, came out in support of CEMB, while confirming the ELM's track record of homophobic incidents.

None of the CEMB placards were against Muslim people. They did not incite hate against Muslims. They criticised homophobic religious ideas. Criticising ideas is fine. Stirring hate against people is not.
Since there is nothing wrong or shameful about being gay, there is nothing insulting about saying Allah, God, Jesus, Moses, Buddha, Shiva or any other religious figure is gay. A person would only say it was insulting if they were anti-LGBT.

— Peter Tatchell

Several other prominent activists such as atheism advocate professor Richard Dawkins and Muslim reformist Maajid Nawaz sided with CEMB as well. 8 months later, Pride organisers met with CEMB and agreed to let them participate again in future Pride marches.

=== Bread and Roses TV ===
Nano GoleSorkh (Persian) or Bread and Roses TV (English) is the CEMB's weekly bilingual television programme and YouTube channel. It is hosted by Maryam Namazie and Fariborz Pooya. The programme aims to promote freethought and break religious taboos around the world. A typical episode is about 25 minutes long, features news about ex-Muslims and human rights issues around the world, an interview with a prominent atheist or secularist activist, the "Insane Fatwa of the Week", and a "Slice of Life".

=== Secular Conference ===
Islam's Non-Believers panel discussion at the 2017 Conference

Since 2014, the Council of Ex-Muslims of Britain has organised a Secular Conference to discuss issues relating to the situation of ex-Muslims, how to strengthen and grow the movement and how to address Islam, Islamism and other opponents of ex-Muslims, such as Western far-right and regressive left groups. The 2017 conference was claimed to be "the largest gathering of ex-Muslims in history".

- 2014 Secular Conference: Religious Right, Secularism and Civil Rights Conference
- 2015 Secular Conference: Sharia Law, Apostasy and Secularism Conference
- 2016 Secular Conference: Sharia Law, Legal Pluralism and Access to Justice Conference
- 2017 Secular Conference: International Conference on Freedom of Conscience and Expression
- 2018 Secular Conference: International Conference on Sharia, Segregation and Secularism

== News coverage ==
- The courage of their convictions - Guardian Unlimited
- NSS supports the launch of the Ex-Muslim Council of Britain - National Secular Society
