= Capital punishment for non-violent offenses =

Capital punishment for offenses is allowed by law in some countries. Such offenses include adultery, apostasy, blasphemy, corruption, drug trafficking, espionage, fraud, homosexuality, treason, and sodomy not involving force, perjury causing execution of an innocent person (which, however, may well be considered and even prosecutable as murder), prostitution, sorcery, witchcraft, and theft. In addition to civilian treason and espionage, often considered capital crimes against the state where the death penalty is retained, military laws frequently ordain execution for serious offences, including in jurisdictions where capital punishment is illegal or obsolete under civilian law.

== Adultery ==
The following countries impose the death penalty for adultery: Afghanistan, Brunei, Iran, Maldives, Mauritania, Nigeria, Saudi Arabia, Yemen, Sudan, Qatar.

== Apostasy and blasphemy ==
Apostasy means renouncing/abandoning/leaving one's religion for another religion (known as conversion) or irreligion (known as deconversion or disaffiliation, including to stances such as atheism, agnosticism and freethought). In the 21st century, this is considered a crime only for Muslims, in a limited number of countries and territories (twenty-five as of 2014 according to Pew Research Center, all of which were located in Africa or Asia), about ten of which include capital punishment as a penalty for it; other jurisdictions may inflict less severe punishments such as imprisonment, a fine or loss of some civil rights, notably one's marriage and child custody. Converting a Muslim to another religion or irreligion is sometimes also criminalised as being an 'accomplice to apostasy'. Apostasy is not known to be a crime liable to any type of penalty for adherents of any other religion in any country in the 21st century. Article 18 of the Universal Declaration of Human Rights (1948) includes the 'freedom to change [one's] religion or belief', therefore any obstruction of apostasy is considered a human rights violation in international law.

Blasphemy means insult, defamation or desecration (sacrilege) of something that or someone who is deemed holy in one or more religions. Unlike apostasy, the religious status of the person suspected or accused of blasphemy is generally regarded as irrelevant; for example, a Muslim may be accused of 'blaspheming' a thing or person deemed holy by some Christians (or Christian organisation or authority), and vice versa, even if that thing or person is not 'holy' to the suspect. In the 21st century, blasphemy is much more widely criminalised than apostasy, in jurisdictions around the world, and is influenced by several religions including Christianity and Islam. As of July 2020, blasphemy could be punished by the death penalty in eight countries, all of which were Muslim-majority.

In some jurisdictions influenced by Sharia (Islamic law), apostasy and blasphemy are closely linked offences. 'Apostasy', or 'public expression of apostasy', is sometimes considered a form, or evidence of, blasphemy; it is then prosecuted as such, even though 'apostasy' itself may not be a crime. This has occurred for example in Pakistan. Likewise, blasphemy is sometimes considered a form, or evidence of, apostasy, and is then prosecuted as such, even though 'blasphemy' itself may not be a (capital) crime. An example of where this situation can occur is Qatar.

Apostasy and blasphemy tend to be closely legally linked to atheism. Formally, being an atheist—or otherwise non-religious person—itself is not an offence in any country, but in practice it is difficult to be an atheist without being able to become an atheist (which is legally impossible for Muslims in many countries, some of which impose capital punishment) or while needing to keep it a secret to everyone that one is an atheist. Therefore, although there is a technical difference between becoming an atheist (a form of apostasy), being an atheist (atheism), and expressing that one is an atheist (which is considered a form of 'blasphemy' by some), some commentators frame the legal situation such that 'being an atheist is punishable by death' or that 'atheism is punishable by the death penalty' in some countries.

=== Apostasy ===
Death penalty for apostasy

As of July 2020, apostasy by Muslims (ridda) carries the death penalty in the following countries: Afghanistan, Brunei, Iran, the Maldives, Mauritania, Qatar, Saudi Arabia, Somalia (implicitly), the United Arab Emirates, and Yemen. Malaysia's states Kelantan and Terengganu mandate the death penalty for apostasy, but federal law prohibits execution for this purpose; due to this, it is never implemented in practice. Likewise in Nigeria, some northern states have adopted Sharia law, although execution for apostasy would violate the Federal Constitution, and it is therefore uncertain whether death sentences could actually be carried out.

- Afghanistan: "According to the Article 1 of the Penal Code, crimes of hudud and qisas, including apostasy, have punishments inflicted in accordance with the Hanafi Jurisprudence of Sharia law, which includes death punishment for non-believers and apostates."
- Brunei: Section 112(1) of the 2013 Syariah (Sharia) Penal Code (fully implemented in 2019) makes a Muslim who declares himself non-Muslim punishable by death, or with imprisonment for a term not exceeding thirty years and corporal punishment, depending on the type of evidence. If a Sharia Court is satisfied that the accused has repented, the Court must order an acquittal.
- Iran: Apostasy is not explicitly defined in Iran's civil or criminal legislation, but according to Article 167 of the constitution: "The judge is bound to endeavor to judge each case on the basis of the codified law. In case of the absence of any such law, he has to deliver his judgment on the basis of authoritative Islamic sources and authentic fatwa." Sharia law has been used to punish Muslim apostates with the death penalty. In 1989, Hossein Soodmand, who converted from Islam to Christianity and was a pastor of the Assemblies of God, was murdered for apostasy. The last recorded murder for apostasy in Iran was in 1990.

State laws on apostasy in Malaysia. Criminal offences include 'apostasy', 'attempted apostasy' and being an 'accomplice to the apostasy' of someone else (i.e. converting another person). Death penalty (suspended by federal law) Imprisonment or detention Apostasy not legally possible Apostasy legally possible after counselling

- Malaysia: Apostasy is not a federal crime. Islamic apostasy laws differ from state to state. Malaysia's states Kelantan and Terengganu mandate the death penalty for apostasy, but federal law prohibits execution for this purpose, and so, it is never implemented in practice. The maximum punishment any state can currently convict a Muslim apostate to is 3 years imprisonment.
- Maldives: "While many religious 'crimes' are not individually spelled out under the penal code, wide berth is given for the prosecution of hudud crimes under Sharia law. The penal code grants judges discretion to impose Sharia penalties, including apostasy and blasphemy." In June 2010, Mohammed Nazim who had publicly declared himself a former Muslim, was arrested by police and given religious counselling by the Islamic Ministry in prison to repent or be executed; Nazim repented and was released.
- Mauritania: "In 2018, Mauritania enacted a law which makes the death sentence for apostasy compulsory."
- Nigeria: "The Nigerian Constitution protects freedom of religion and allows religious conversion. Section 10 of the constitution states, 'The Government of the Federation of a State shall not adopt any religion as State Religion.' However, sections 275–279 of the Constitution give constituent states the power to establish their own Sharia courts on civil matters. Abiding by Sharia law is required for Muslims in some states but optional in others and enforcement differs by state. Rulings and procedures are sometimes difficult to find." Although the states of Nigeria have a degree of autonomy to adopt their own laws, the first paragraph of the Federal Constitution stipulates that any law inconsistent with the provisions of the constitution shall be void. The Sharia penal code does contradict the Constitution, yet the federal government has not made a move to restore this breach of the constitutional order, letting the northern Muslim-dominated states have their way and not protecting the constitutional rights of citizens violated by Sharia. It is unclear whether any of the 12 northern states that have adopted some Sharia legislation are carrying out the death penalty, which would violate the Federal Constitution.
- Qatar: "Converting to another religion from Islam is considered apostasy and remains a capital offence in Qatar (Article 1.1 of Law 11 of 2004)." ... "A blasphemy accusation could be taken as evidence of apostasy" (rather than the other way around). "However since 1971 no punishment for apostasy has been recorded." On its own, blasphemy carries the maximum penalty of imprisonment.
- Saudi Arabia: In Saudi Arabia Sharia functions as the law of the land, but it is uncodified in statute. "Apostasy is criminalized and mandates a death penalty. The criminal accusation of "apostasy" is sometimes deployed against people (including writers, activists, artists, or lawyers) who show any serious sign of pushing at the outer boundaries of freedom of expression, or who are critical of the religious authorities, and whose views (rightly or wrongly) are termed 'atheist' or as 'insulting to religion'. These laws are actively utilized."
Blasphemy (conceived as 'a deviation from Sunni Islam') is frequently considered a form of apostasy and may be prosecuted as such (contrary to other jurisdictions, where apostasy is sometimes used as evidence of blasphemy). In a 2012 incident, Saudi authorities detained two men and charged them with apostasy for adopting the Ahmadiyya interpretation of Islam.
- Somalia: "The 2012 provisional federal constitution of Somalia does not explicitly prohibit apostasy but does state that Sharia law comes before federal law."
  - 'Article 2: State and Religion. (3) No law can be enacted that is not compliant with the general principles and objectives of Shari'ah.'
    Since execution for apostasy is the regular punishment in Sharia law, it is presumed that apostasy in Somalia carries the death penalty. In addition, the federal constitution (Article 2), the Somaliland constitution (Article 5.1), and the Puntland constitution (Article 6) all prohibit the propagation of any other religion than Islam, and the latter two also explicitly prohibit Muslim apostasy
  - 'Article 33: Freedom of Belief 1. Every person shall have the right to freedom of belief, and shall not be compelled to adopt another belief. Islamic Sharia does not accept that a Muslim person can renounce his beliefs.';
  - 'Article 24: Freedom of Faith. 1. No one can be forced to a faith; different from his/her believes. 2. The Muslim person does not have the right to convert from the Islamic faith.',
    though the punishment is not clear.
- United Arab Emirates: "All citizens of the UAE are deemed to be Muslims. Conversion to other religions (and by implication, advocacy of atheism) is forbidden and the legal punishment for conversion from Islam is death (Article 1 and 66 of the Penal Code), although there have been no known prosecutions or legal punishments for apostasy in court."
- Yemen: "The act of 'apostasy' is punishable by death. Under Yemeni law "denouncing Islam" or any blasphemy conviction may constitute evidence of 'apostasy'. While the rate of capital punishment in Yemen is very high, the government does not enforce the death penalty for apostasy in practice: the law allows those charged with apostasy three opportunities to repent, which absolves them from the death penalty. It is unclear whether a moratorium is in place or whether an 'apostate' who refused to repent would face the death penalty. Family law prohibits marriage between a Muslim and an apostate; by law, apostates have no parental or child-custody rights."

=== Blasphemy ===
Death penalty for blasphemy

As of July 2020, blasphemy can be punished by death in Afghanistan, Brunei, Iran, Mauritania, Nigeria (some northern states), Pakistan, Saudi Arabia and Somalia (al-Shabaab-controlled areas).

- Afghanistan: Blasphemy law in Afghanistan is defined by the Penal Code of 1976, which addresses "Crimes Against Religions", but leaves the issue of blasphemy to Sharia. Sharia permits the authorities to treat blasphemy as a capital crime. The authorities can punish blasphemy with death if the blasphemy is committed by a male of sound mind over age 18 or by a female of sound mind over age 16. Anyone accused of blasphemy has three days to recant. If an accused does not recant, death by hanging may follow.
- Brunei: Capital punishment in Brunei was introduced for blasphemy in April 2019, but under heavy international pressure, the sultan of Brunei announced a moratorium on the death penalty while defending the legislation overall. Various offences of the new Sharia-based penal code which could be framed as 'blasphemy' include 'Propagation of religion other than religion of Islam' (Article 209), printing, disseminating, importing, broadcasting, and distributing of publications deemed contrary to Sharia (Articles 213, 214 and 215), non-Muslims using 'Allah' as the name of their god (for example, Bruneian Christians), 'Contempt etc. of religious authority' (Article 230), 'Incitement to neglect religious duty' (Article 235), amongst other hudud crimes.
- Iran: The Islamic Republic of Iran has a Sharia-based penal code. Amongst the religious offences that may be punished with execution are those categorised as moharebeh, usually translated as 'enmity against God', and mofsed-e-filarz, 'spreading corruption on Earth'. Classically, moharebeh encompassed crimes such as brigandry, rape —especially as a weapon of war, unlawful warfare (or terrorism), while mofsed-e-filarz applied to crimes that threatened society as a whole, such as actions that destabilised good governance.
In modern-day Iran, such charges are brought against political protesters for civil unrest and disobedience (moharebeh) and reformers or political opponents for treason (mofsed-e-filarz), and not aimed at nonbelievers or religious dissenters. The regime periodically executes dozens of prisoners under the guise of these religious offences. For example, in the aftermath of the Mahsa Amini protests, by December 2022, forty-three Iranians had been sentenced to death for moharebeh or mofsed-e-filarz due to their purported involvement. Similarly, there was an upsurge in executions for these crimes following the 2009 Iranian election protests. Although the argument for this use is that opposition to the Islamic state is akin to defiance of Allah, this is not the mainstream Islamic scholarly view. As journalist Brian Murphy explained in a 2009 Associated Press article:

The concept has its roots in a Quranic verse that calls for death, maiming or banishment for those who "wage war" against God, the Prophet Muhammad or bring corruption into society. Many Islamic scholars interpret the references to acts that defy universal codes such as intentionally killing civilians during warfare or causing random destruction.

As such, there has been opposition from clerics within Iran to the use of moharebeh charges against political protesters.
Apart from its political applications, use of the moharebeh or mofsed-e-filarz concepts to prosecute individuals for actual denunciation of Islam or sacrilegious acts is intended to penalise "insulting Islam", and "publishing materials that deviate from Islamic standards"; members of religious minorities (non-Shīʿa, in addition to non-Muslim) are mostly targeted for these transgressions. A clause of this section of the penal code provides for remission of the death penalty to 74 lashes instead, if a convicted person professes that the blasphemy was a mistake or made in anger.
- Mauritania: In 2018, Mauritania upgraded its punishment for blasphemy from imprisonment to death and made it compulsory; convicts were no longer given the option of repentance within three days to go free.
- Nigeria: Blasphemy law in Nigeria allows a suspect to be condemned for blasphemy via the Customary system and the Sharia system. Although this prohibition against blasphemy in the Criminal Code and in Sharia is potentially unconstitutional, since the Federal Constitution's Section 38 entitles every Nigerian to freedom of thought, conscience, and religion, and Section 39 gives every Nigerian the right to freedom of expression, death sentences for blasphemy are frequently carried out in some of the 12 northern states that have implemented Sharia, such as Kano State in 2015 and 2016. Moreover, five Muslim vigilantes who reportedly hacked a Christian woman to death for 'blaspheming the prophet Muhammad' on 2 June 2016 were all acquitted of murder by the Sharia court of Kano State.
- Pakistan: Blasphemy in Pakistan is criminalised by Penal Code Articles 295 to 298. Only blasphemy under 295-C may be punished with the death penalty. It states: 'Use of derogatory remarks, etc., in respect of the Holy Prophet: Whoever by words, either spoken or written, or by visible representation or by any imputation, innuendo, or insinuation, directly or indirectly, defiles the sacred name of the Holy Prophet Muhammad shall be punished with death, or imprisonment for life, and shall also be liable to fine.' Apostasy is sometimes considered evidence of "blasphemy" and is then prosecuted as such, even though apostasy itself is not a crime in Pakistan.
- Saudi Arabia: Blasphemy is conceived of as 'a deviation from Sunni Islam' and therefore considered a form of apostasy and may be prosecuted as such (contrary to other jurisdictions, where apostasy is sometimes considered a form, or evidence, of blasphemy). Because apostasy carries the death penalty, blasphemers are executed, usually by beheading or crucifixion. It is unclear whether blasphemy itself would be separately punishable if there were no prohibition on apostasy.
- Somalia: Due to the ongoing Somali civil war, the militant group Al-Shabaab is able to impose the death penalty for blasphemy in the areas it controls. On the other hand, the 1963 Criminal Code, which applies in the rest of the country, at most punishes 'blasphemy' and 'defamation of Islam' by up to two years in prison. The 2012 provisional federal constitution of Somalia and the Puntland and Somaliland regional constitutions, despite acknowledging the freedom of expression, all prohibit the promotion or propagation of religion other than Islam, though the punishment that the internationally recognised government and regional governments would apply for it is not clear.

== Corruption ==
The following countries impose the death penalty for corruption: China, Indonesia (some acts of corruption which "damage national economy or finances"), Morocco and Thailand (bribery).

== Drug offences ==
Capital punishment for drug offences Only under certain conditions

The following countries allow capital punishment for drug trafficking:

- Bahrain
- Bangladesh
- Brunei
- Burma
- China
- Cuba
- Democratic Republic of the Congo (in wartime)
- Egypt
- India (option for second conviction for drug trafficking in specific quantities)
- Indonesia
- Iran
- Iraq
- Jordan
- Kuwait
- Laos
- Libya
- Malaysia
- North Korea
- Oman
- Qatar
- Pakistan
- Saudi Arabia
- Singapore
- South Korea
- South Sudan (with "aggravated circumstances")
- Sri Lanka
- Sudan
- Syria
- Taiwan
- Thailand
- United Arab Emirates
- United States (under certain conditions or if the offence involved death)
- Yemen

=== Alcohol offences ===
Possessing or using alcoholic beverages is illegal or highly restricted in some countries. There has been at least one report of an execution for an alcohol-related offence. In 2020, Amnesty International reported that a man was sentenced to death in Iran for "repeated convictions for drinking alcohol". The sentence of death was carried out. In those states where alcohol is illegal or highly restricted—including, in most circumstances, in Iran—the penalties are generally fines, jail sentences, or corporal punishments such as whipping.

== Espionage ==
The following countries impose the death penalty for espionage:

- Afghanistan
- Algeria
- Bahrain
- Bangladesh
- Barbados
- Botswana
- Burkina Faso
- Cameroon
- China
- Cuba
- Democratic Republic of the Congo
- Egypt
- Equatorial Guinea
- Eritrea
- Ethiopia
- Guatemala
- India
- Indonesia
- Iran
- Iraq
- Jordan
- Kuwait
- Laos
- Lebanon
- Liberia
- Libya
- Mali
- Mauritania
- Morocco
- Niger
- North Korea
- Oman
- Pakistan
- Palestine
- Peru
- Qatar
- Saudi Arabia
- Somalia
- South Korea
- Sudan
- Syria
- Thailand
- Tunisia
- United Arab Emirates
- United States
- Vietnam
- Yemen

== Fraud ==
China and Vietnam impose the death penalty for fraud. In the case of China, it can be imposed for especially damaging cases of financial fraud.

== Homosexuality and sodomy ==
Laws regarding homosexuality Capital punishment Death penalty on books but not applied

According to the ILGA, there are six countries which under law allow capital punishment for same-sex sexual acts: Brunei, Iran, Mauritania, Nigeria (in part: northern states only), Saudi Arabia, and Yemen. There are five others for which the situation is less certain legally, but where capital punishment for same-sex sexual acts may apply: Afghanistan, Pakistan, Qatar, Somalia (including Somaliland), and the United Arab Emirates.

In 2023, Uganda passed the Anti-Homosexuality Act, 2023 which introduced harsher penalties for homosexual acts. Section 3 of the act created an offence of "aggravated homosexuality" which is liable to the death penalty. This is defined as sexual intercourse with a person over 75 or child under 18, a person not consenting or unable to consent, or a disabled or mentally ill person. Those convicted of homosexual offences multiple times are also defined as "aggravated homosexuals".

In July 2020, the sodomy law of Sudan, that previously punished gay men with up to 100 lashes for the first offence, five years in jail for the second and the death penalty the third time around, was abolished, with new legislation reducing the penalty to prison terms ranging from five years to life.

== Perjury ==
The following countries impose the death penalty for perjury causing the wrongful execution of an innocent person:

- Afghanistan
- Algeria
- Bahrain
- Bangladesh
- Brunei
- Egypt
- India
- Iran (only in case of recidivism for capital sexual offences)
- Kuwait
- Malaysia
- Mauritania
- Morocco
- Myanmar
- Niger
- Nigeria
- Oman
- Pakistan
- Qatar
- Singapore
- South Sudan
- Sri Lanka
- Sudan
- United Arab Emirates
- some U.S. states:
  - California
  - Nebraska
- Yemen

Most U.S. states, as well as most countries around the world that retain capital punishment, would normally consider perjury causing execution of an innocent person as murder and punish it the same way; often by death or life without parole. In Nebraska and Colorado, perjury causing execution of an innocent person is considered by law as an act of first-degree murder, punishable by death or life without parole. In California, perjury causing execution of an innocent person is a discrete offence and is separated from laws regarding murder or homicide; it is also punishable by death or life without parole. (In comparison, in this jurisdiction, first-degree murder is punished by death, life without parole or 25 years to life in prison). Some countries, such as Morocco and Mauritania, punish perjury by death when any person who is innocent has been sentenced to death for any reason. Even if the execution does not occur, perjury causing someone to be sentenced to death in itself is a death-eligible offence in these countries.

== Prostitution ==
Iran, North Korea, Sudan, and Yemen provide for capital punishment for prostitution.

The following countries impose the death penalty for various offences related to prostitution:

- Forced prostitution only: Bangladesh
- Child prostitution: Cuba

== Sorcery and witchcraft ==
Saudi Arabia, and Iran impose the death penalty for sorcery and witchcraft.

== Theft ==
The following countries impose the death penalty for theft: Afghanistan; Algeria and Cameroon (both for "aggravated theft"); China; Iran and Saudi Arabia (both for "recidivist theft"); North Korea ("grand theft").

== Treason ==
The following countries still allow capital punishment for treason:

- Afghanistan
- Algeria
- Antigua and Barbuda
- Bahamas
- Bahrain
- Bangladesh
- Barbados
- Belarus
- Belize
- Botswana
- Brazil (only in war)
- Brunei
- Burkina Faso
- Burma ("high treason")
- Cameroon
- China
- Cuba
- Democratic Republic of the Congo
- Dominica
- Egypt
- Equatorial Guinea
- Eritrea
- Eswatini
- Ethiopia
- Gambia
- Ghana
- Grenada
- Guatemala
- Guyana
- India
- Indonesia ("high treason")
- Iran
- Iraq
- Japan
- Jordan
- Kenya
- Kuwait
- Laos
- Lebanon
- Lesotho
- Liberia
- Libya ("high treason")
- Malaysia
- Maldives
- Mali
- Mauritania
- Morocco
- Niger
- Nigeria
- North Korea
- Oman
- Pakistan
- Palestine
- Peru
- Qatar
- Saint Christopher and Nevis
- Saint Lucia
- Saint Vincent and the Grenadines
- Saudi Arabia
- Singapore
- Somalia
- South Korea ("conspiracy with foreign countries")
- South Sudan
- Sri Lanka
- Sudan
- Syria
- Taiwan
- Tanzania
- Thailand ("high treason")
- Tonga
- Trinidad and Tobago
- Tunisia
- Uganda
- United Arab Emirates
- United States – federal crime; also in some individual states, for example:
  - Arkansas
  - California
  - Georgia
  - Louisiana
  - Mississippi
  - Missouri
- Vietnam
- Yemen

== See also ==
- Coker v. Georgia
- Kennedy v. Louisiana
- Outline of capital punishment
- Capital punishment by country
- Victimless crime
