= New Age Islam =

Institution based in New Delhi, India

New Age Islam (Hindi: न्यू ऐज इस्लाम, Urdu:نیو ایج اسلام, Arabic: نيو أج اسلام) is a liberal Muslim institution based in New Delhi, India. It encourages progressive thinking among Muslims worldwide by exposing them to news, analyses and opinions on a variety of social, political, theological and spiritual issues related to Islam. It also provides a platform for debate on contemporary concerns facing Muslims, such as religious extremism, terrorism and relations with other religious groups.

== History ==
New Age Islam was established in April 2008 by a group of Muslims concerned that “the very word Muslim has become synonymous with terrorism, backwardness and ignorance.” Its founders are mostly South Asian, some of them based in the Middle East, Europe, North America and Australia.

Sultan Shahin, the Indian editor of NewAgeIslam.com, said in a 2009 interview with The Hindu newspaper that the thinking behind the institution went back at least a decade, to the time he was “hectored by an earnest young man outside London’s Finsbury Park mosque” who said Indian Muslims were not “true Muslims” as they did not resort to violence. In a still earlier incident, a 20-year-old member of the Ahle Hadees, a sect that propagates a puritanical interpretation of Islam, told him that all Muslims who did not belong to his sect should be killed. Shahin said these experiences transformed him: “It became clear to me that the Islam that I believe in was under serious threat, and that I would have to do something if the religion I loved was not to be demeaned by the evil that was being spoken in its name.”

Shahin spent the next few years writing in various print and online publications against religious extremism, terrorism and sectarianism among Muslims and arguing for a return to Islam's syncretic values, before establishing New Age Islam and launching its website. The website soon became popular, gaining 29,000 subscribers for its newsletter within a year of its launch, and 117,000 registered subscribers in two years. It underwent a complete redesign in early 2012.

The website was blocked in Pakistan in 2013.

== Activities ==
New Age Islam's tagline is «Mapping an Agenda for the Twenty-first Century». Editor Sultan Shahin has stated that he launched NewAgeIslam.com «to reclaim Islam from the clutches of jihadists and petrodollar-funded Salafist-Wahhabis» Its editorial position is liberal and progressive.

Its stated objectives are to:

1. Encourage serious rethinking about all Islamic postulates, point by point, in the light of our requirements in the 21st century.
2. Keep the global Muslim community informed of all that is going on in the Muslim world so that they can take informed decisions.
3. Encourage a debate with our educated youth, which seems to be going astray, becoming prey to misguided ideologies and participating in activities that are endangering the lives of other Muslims and non-Muslims.
4. Keep reminding ourselves of the rich spiritual traditions of tolerance, pluralism and multiculturalism that we have inherited.

New Age Islam also promotes human equality by arguing, from within the common tradition of all Abrahamic faiths, that all mankind is born from Adam and Eve (Hawwa), rendering religious, ethnics and other differences meaningless. The institution prints an annual anthology of selected works from its website.

== Contributors ==
New Age Islam publishes Indian Islamic scholars Asghar Ali Engineer, Maulana Wahiduddin Khan, Dr. Shabbir Ahmed, Professor Yoginder Sikand, Maulvi Waris Mazhari and Masood Alam Falahi. It also occasionally publishes Javed Ahmad Ghamdi, Chandra Muzaffar, Mike Ghouse, Maulvi Yahya Nomani, M.J. Akbar, Maulana Javed Haider Zaidi, and many other moderate thinkers who may not be considered Islamic scholars but have studied and write extensively on Islam. It has interviewed scholars and activists such as Maulana Zahid ur-Rashidi, Maulana Mirza Mohammad Athar, Banu Mushtaq, Daud Sharifa Khanum, Seema Mustafa, Hanif Lakdawala, Aijaz Ilmi, Firoz Bakht Ahmed and Ather Farouqui, who are working in various fields and seeking to uphold a moderate view of Islam. It also publishes conservative views of Deobandi scholars such as Maulana Nadeemul Wajidi, and translates opinion pieces from the Urdu press.

== See also ==
- Islam in India
- Liberal Muslim movements
