= Evangelical Lutheran Church of Eritrea =

Protestant denomination in Eritrea

- Classification: Protestant
- Orientation: Lutheran
- Associations: Lutheran World Federation; Lutheran Communion in Central and Eastern Africa; Fellowship of Christian Councils and Churches in the Great Lakes and Horn of Africa
- Region: Eritrea
- Origin: 1866
- Members: 11,000

The Evangelical Lutheran Church of Eritrea (ELCE) is a Lutheran denomination in Eritrea. It was established in 1866. It is a member of the Lutheran World Federation, which it joined in 1963. Its president is Rev. Yoseph Fanuel Ghebreyesus and its General Secretary is Temesghen Berhane Zecharias. It has 11 thousand members.
