= International League of Non-Religious and Atheists =

International association formed in 1976

Logo of IBKA

The International League of Non-religious and Atheists (German: Internationaler Bund der Konfessionslosen und Atheisten, IBKA) is an international association founded in Berlin in 1976 as "International League of Non-religious" (IBDK). It originated from the MIZ magazine and the Bund der Konfessionslosen Berlin (Union of the non-religious in Berlin) founded in 1972, and adopted the name IBKA in 1982. It has approximately 1000 members and 13 corporate members, as well as a Scientific Council. It is registered as an eingetragener Verein (e.V.) in Germany.

Among its objectives, IBKA promotes rationalism and pursues the establishment of human rights and scientific freedom, as well as the separation of church and state. In 2014, it campaigned together with the "Alliance for Self-Determination until the End of Life" against the penalization of assisted dying in Germany.
