= Mohamed Cheikh Ould Mkhaitir =

Mauritanian blogger (born 1985)

- محمد الشيخ ولد امخيطير
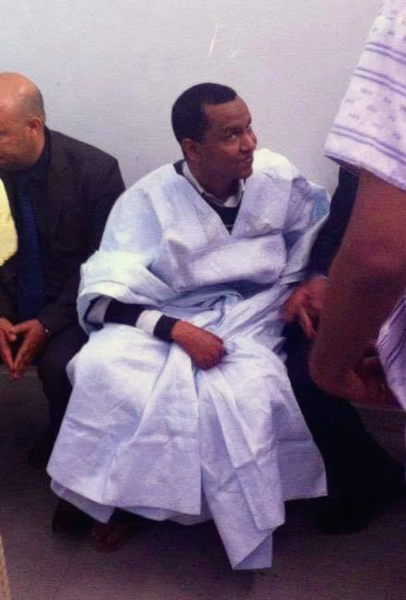
- Born: 1985 (age 40–41)
- Occupations: Engineer, freelance journalist, blogger
- Known for: Blogging, apostasy and blasphemy charge

Mohamed Cheikh Ould Mkhaitir (Arabic: محمد الشيخ ولد امخيطير; born 1985) is a Mauritanian blogger who was a political prisoner from 2014 to 2019. He was sentenced to death after he wrote an article critical of Islam and the caste system in Mauritania, after which he became a designated prisoner of conscience by Amnesty International. He now lives in exile in France due to concerns for his safety.

Mkhaitir was born into the Moulamines caste, commonly referred to as the blacksmith caste, which holds the second lowest social status in Mauritania. Before he was arrested on charges of apostasy he worked for SAMMA, a company partially owned by Kinross.

== Arrest and death sentence ==
Mkhaitir was arrested in his home in the city of Nouadhibou on 2 January 2014, two days after publishing an article titled “Religion, Religiosity and Craftsmen” on the website Aqlame. The article was critical of incidents from the prophet Muhammad's life being used to justify slavery of people descended from craftsmen by the upperclass of Mauritania (relating to the caste system in Mauritania). Clerics issued a fatwa against him and demanded he be executed, and a businessman offered reward of 10,000 ouguiya for his death. He was charged with apostasy under Article 306 of the Mauritanian criminal code, and subsequently sentenced to death by firing squad. If the sentence had been carried out Mkhaitir would have been the first person executed in Mauritania since 1987. Despite repenting and saying the shahada, the supreme court upheld his death sentence.

On 1 April 2016 the case was heard by the court of appeals. The verdict was upheld, but the case was sent to Mauritania's Supreme Court. In December 2016, Mkhaitir's parents fled the country and appealed for asylum in France, unable to bear constant death threats any longer. On 31 January 2017, the Supreme Court heard the case and returned it to the Court of Appeals. When the appeal was taken to the Supreme Court, protesters, some of them armed, gathered in Nouakchott demanding his execution.

Addressing the United Nations Human Rights Council as a representative of the International Humanist and Ethical Union, Kacem El Ghazzali highlighted the case of Mkhaitir, to which the Mauritanian ambassador to the UNHRC claimed Mkhaitir was arrested for his own safety. The diplomat also reportedly insisted "there is no need to talk about the death penalty".

On 3 November 2017, police in the capital Nouakchott dispersed a demonstration and arrested four people for inciting to kill Mkhaitir. A week later, the Court of Appeals in Nouadhibou reduced his death sentence to a two-year jail term. He was supposed to be released immediately as he had already been in jail for more than two years, reported the BBC. However, by May 2018 he still had not been released according to human rights groups. In late April 2018, the Mauritanian government even adopted a new, more stringent blasphemy law that could have alleged 'blasphemers' such as Mkhaitir subjected to the death penalty. Twenty-one national and international organisations vehemently opposed the new law, including Center for Inquiry President Robyn Blumner at the United Nations Human Rights Council.

On 30 July 2019, Mkhaitir's lawyer Fatimata Mbaye and the campaign group Reporters Without Borders reported that Mkhaitir had been released from prison and no longer in Nouakchott, though Mbaye said he 'is not completely free in his movements'. Mkhaitir thanked all the organisations who had been campaigning on his behalf ever since his arrest in January 2014. In October 2019, AFP reported that he had started a new life in Bordeaux, France where he continued his activism, having learned French during his time in prison.

== See also ==
- Raif Badawi – A liberal Muslim blogger sentenced to 1,000 lashes for "insulting Islam" in Saudi Arabia
- Ashraf Fayadh – Also sentenced to death for apostasy
