= Ahmad Al Shamri =

- أحمد الشامري
- Born: Hafar al-Batin
- Known for: Alleged apostasy, death sentence

Ahmad Al Shamri is an imprisoned Saudi dissident facing the death penalty for alleged apostasy and blasphemy. He was born in the city of Hafar al-Batin, Saudi Arabia. His case was first brought to the religious authorities in 2014 after he allegedly renounced his Islamic faith on social media. In 2015 he was sentenced to death upon conviction of apostasy and blasphemy by a local court. After two appeals his death sentence was upheld, drawing international reactions in both support and opposition to the sentence via the hashtag #مرتد_حفرالباطن.
