= Sultan Shahin =

Indian journalist

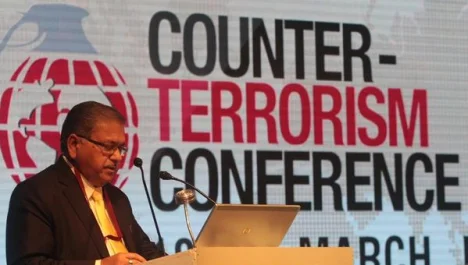
- Born: Aurangabad, Bihar, India
- Education: Patna University
- Occupations: Journalist, author
- Notable work: Founder of New Age Islam

Sultan Shahin is an Indian journalist, editor, and the founder of the online publication New Age Islam. He is known for his critical analysis of contemporary issues related to Islam, particularly in the context of extremism, terrorism, and the reform of Islamic thought.

== Early life and education ==
Shahin was born in 1949 in a village in Aurangabad district, Bihar, India. His father was a maulvi and an Urdu teacher. Shahin's early education was at home and later at a local Hindi-medium school. Despite financial constraints, he pursued higher education, earning a bachelor's degree from Patna University.

== Career ==
Shahin's journalistic career began with the English-language organ of the Jamaat-e-Islami, Radiance Weekly, in Delhi. However, he soon left due to ideological differences. Over the years, he worked with various newspapers and news agencies, both in India and abroad, including a stint in London.

Sultan Shahin has worked with various media organizations, both in India and internationally. His journalism often focuses on the challenges faced by Muslims in the modern world, particularly the rise of radicalism and the need for a progressive interpretation of Islam. He has been an outspoken critic of extremist ideologies and has called for a reformative approach within the Muslim community to counteract the narratives of violence and intolerance.

In 2008, Sultan Shahin founded New Age Islam, a web magazine dedicated to promoting moderate and progressive views within Islam. The platform provides a space for intellectual discourse on a wide range of topics, including the reinterpretation of Islamic scriptures, the role of women in Islam, and the relationship between Islam and modernity.

== Ideology and influences ==
Shahin’s ideology, as reflected in his writings on NewAgeIslam.com, center on a passionate call for reform within Islamic thought and practice. As the founder and editor of the platform, Shahin positions himself as a progressive Muslim voice advocating for a reimagined Islam that aligns with modern values of peace, pluralism, gender justice, and tolerance, while fiercely opposing extremist ideologies like jihadism, Salafism, and Wahhabism.

Shahin’s work is rooted in the belief that Islam, at its core, is a spiritual path to salvation rather than a political or totalitarian ideology. He critiques the historical evolution of Islamic theology and jurisprudence, particularly from the 8th and 9th centuries, which he argues has been distorted into a framework of supremacism, xenophobia, and violence—fueling contemporary radicalism. His speeches and writings, such as "Defeating Islamism and Jihadism: Evolve a New Theology of Peace, Pluralism and Gender Justice" and "If Islam Means Peace, Why Is Much of Its Theology Soaked In Hatred, Humiliation, Offensive War?", emphasize the urgent need for Muslims to rethink these theological foundations. He urges the development of a counter-narrative that reflects Islam’s original ideals of coexistence and harmony, as he perceives them, to combat the allure of jihadist ideologies among youth.

A key aspect of Shahin’s work is his critique of what he terms "Petrodollar Islam" — the spread of rigid, exclusivist interpretations funded by oil-rich states, which he sees as a betrayal of Islam’s pluralistic heritage. He positions himself as a defender of a tolerant, inclusive Islam, drawing from his personal experiences with extremism to underline the stakes. His advocacy extends to practical reforms, such as in "Reform Muslim Personal Law, Use Debate on Triple Talaq as an Opportunity," where he calls for modernizing Muslim personal laws in India, particularly on issues like triple talaq, to address gender inequality and stagnation in religious thought.

Shahin’s approach is both intellectual and activist. He engages with Islamic texts, history, and contemporary issues, often addressing the United Nations Human Rights Council (UNHRC) to amplify his message globally. His writings reflect a deep frustration with the Muslim community’s failure to confront radicalism proactively and a conviction that progressive reinterpretation (via principles like Ijtihad) is essential for Islam to remain relevant in the 21st century. While he acknowledges the diversity of Muslim societies, he consistently challenges the ulema and traditional scholars to shed outdated doctrines and embrace a theology that prioritizes human rights and mutual respect across faiths.

In essence, Shahin’s work reveals an ideology that is reformist, pluralistic, and anti-extremist, driven by a vision of Islam as a dynamic, evolving faith capable of fostering peace and justice in a modern, interconnected world.
