= Sam Touzani =

Belgian actor, television presenter, choreographer and stand-up comedian

- Born: 1968 (age 57–58); Belgium
- Occupations: Actor; comedian; presenter; choreographer

Sam Touzani (born 1968) is a Belgian actor, television presenter, choreographer and stand-up comedian with Berber-Moroccan roots. Touzani is known as a critic of Islamism, of the far-right, and of what he perceives as political correctness from the left. He is an ex-Muslim and has received fatwas and hundreds of death threats because of his public apostasy, especially from Muslims.

== Biography ==
Touzani's parents came from the Rif in Morocco. They came to Belgium in 1964 during a migration wave. When Touzani was 8 years old, he and his parents took part in a demonstration against racism, which had a deep and lasting impact on him. He began to develop a strong interest in protest, political ideologies, forms of government and human rights. In this formative period, the Belgian-Moroccan dissident Mohammed el Baroudi had an important influence on the evolution of his ideas. He chose democracy and dialogue over violent resistance and authoritarianism.

He discovered theatre, comedy and humour as a means to make people think, question their views and start necessary discussions about societal issues. He read up on philosophy and psychoanalysis, two ways of thinking which made him very critical of religion, and publicly renounce his Islamic faith at the age of 19.

After the November 2015 Paris attacks, which were prepared in the Brussels municipality of Molenbeek, Touzani kept performing in Brussels, despite the heightened fears of new terrorist attacks and amid militarised security forces on the streets. He stated it was important not to give in to fear, and that he would maintain his 'sharp critique of Islamists, nationalists and extremists.' His new show Les enfants de Dom Juan, co-written by Ben Hamidou, was his response to the attacks, in which he demands the Muslim community to critically reflect on their beliefs and behaviour, that motivated some of its members towards radicalisation and terrorism. It also sought to break the taboo on homosexuality and apostasy within the Muslim community. Parti Socialiste politician Philippe Moureaux (former burgomaster of Molenbeek 1993–2012) banned Touzani from performing in the municipality for 10 years, and the show was boycotted by the inhabitants and associations of Molenbeek.

== Views ==
Touzani is an 'atheist', an 'ex-Muslim' and 'irreligious', but he doesn't like those terms because they indicate what he is not, while there are many things he does believe in, namely 'humanity, nature and humane laws.' He is a great admirer of Richard Dawkins, the editors of Charlie Hebdo (many of whom he knows/knew personally), sympathises with the Church of the Flying Spaghetti Monster (pastafarianism), and in one of his shows he announced his own parody religion of Touzanism.

Touzani often takes part in the public debate, and rebukes both far-right extremists (amongst which he includes Vlaams Belang) and Islamists who regularly send him death threats and have even attacked him physically for being an ex-Muslim and openly criticising Islam. Neither does he want 'the politically correct left' to tell him how to behave, and he refuses to use the term 'Islamophobia', "not even a second; that concept is being used to make any criticism [of Islam] impossible, and silence the real debate." Furthermore, he criticises cultural relativism: "Our country emphasies ethnic-religious diversity and rights, while equality, citizenship and transparency come in second place. It should be the other way around." According to Touzani, Islam is in desperate need of reform, similar to how the Catholic Church has implemented an aggiornamento at the Second Vatican Council; otherwise it will disappear due to its 'rigidity'.

== Theatrical shows ==
- 2002: One Human Show, one man show, Théâtre de Poche (Brussels)
- 2003: Gembloux ! À la recherche de l'armée oubliée, with Ben Hamidou and Sam Touzani, KVS and Avignon (about Moroccan soldiers during World War I)
- 2004: Les Discours du XXième siècle, Théâtre de Poche (Brussels)
- 2005: Contes érotico-urbains, by Thomas Gunzig, with Riton Liebman, Théâtre de Poche (Brussels)
- 2005: Ruben déballe tout !, one man show
- 2005: Allah Super Star, by Yassir Ben Miloud, Théâtre de Poche (Brussels)
- 2006: Le Rapport des enfants sur l’état du Monde, by Stanislas Cotton, Théâtre de la Balsamine
- 2006: Liberté égalité sexualité, one man show by Bernard Breuse and Sam Touzani, KVS
- 2010: Mozaik, one man show, with Dhalia Pessemiers, Zuideperhuis, Antwerpen
- 2010: Ruben refait le monde, one man show, Festival of Spa
- 2011: À portée de crachat, by Taher Najib, with Sam Touzani, Espace Senghor
- 2011: For the Beauty of Confusion, musical spectacle, with Geike Arnaert, Le Botanique
- 2012: Peur de rien, one man show, with Richard Ruben, Centre culturel de Woluwé
- 2014: Papier d’Arménie – Sans retour possible, by Caroline Safarian, with Sam Touzani, Espace Magh
- 2014: Rwanda mais avant et puis après, by Souâd Belhaddad, with Sam Touzani, Centre culturel de Schaerbeek
- 2014: Je suis Belge... mais ça ne se voit pas, with Richard Ruben, Théâtre du Forum, Festival of Avignon
- 2014: Les chaussures de Fadi or Les Souliers de Fadi, by Caroline Safarian, with Ben Hamidou, Espace Magh
- 2015: C’est ici que le jour se lève, by Sam Touzani and Rolland Westreich, Théâtre Le Public
- 2016: Les enfants de Dom Juan
- 2017: Liberté-Egalité-Identité, Théâtre Le Public

== Filmography ==
=== Films ===
Feature films

- 1997: Le Bal masqué by Julien Vrebos: Nico
- 1999: Deuxième quinzaine de juillet by Christophe Reichert: M. Dehaan
- 2003: Et si... (vertige de la page blanche) by Raoul Ruiz: Pierre Marchand

Short films and intermediate films

- 1995: La Visite, short film by Lilian Cornelis and Jean Baptiste Van Zeebroeck: Maxime
- 1996: Testament d'un macaque, intermediate film by Jamel Mokni: Lakhdar
- 2004: Beaucoup de bruit by Ismaël Saidi: Sami
- 2005: Le Train by Luc Descamps: the passenger

=== Television ===
- 1993: École d'enfer by Jacques Bourton: Mehdi
- 1994: La Veuve de l'architecte by Philippe Monnier: Pépo
- 1995: Tip Tap Show, television musical by Pierre Baré, RTBF-Télé 2-TV5: the professor / Charlot
- 2001: Le Piège d'Oléa by Alain Robak: the brancardier
- 2001: La Torpille by Luc Boland: Gus, the rapper
- 2009: Chante !: Karim Brahi

As presenter

- 1993: presentation of the theme night Étranges étrangers (Arte)
- 1993–1996: Luna Park (RTBF, TV5)
- 1994: live presentation of the Fête de la musique in Dinant (RTBF)
- 1995: co-presentation of L'Énigme de Cristal (RTBF, TV5)
- 1995: Basketmania (RTBF La Deux)
- 1997: co-presentation of Complètement Télé (RTBF La Deux)
- 2003: Mille et une culture, portrait of Sam Touzani (RTBF-TV5)
- 2004: La Bataille de Gembloux, de la réalité à la fiction (RTBF La Deux)
- 2006: La Malédiction de l’Anneau, series on Richard Wagner's Tetralogy (RTBF)

== Recognition ==
- Sabam award for Liberté-Egalité-Identité
