= Kritische Islamkonferenz =

Logo

The Kritische Islamkonferenz or KIK (English: Critical Islam Conference) is an irregular organised event in Germany, which was conceived to be the critical counterpart to the Deutsche Islamkonferenz (German Islam Conference). Its first edition took place in 2008 in Cologne, where it was co-hosted by the Central Council of Ex-Muslims and the Giordano Bruno Foundation. The second edition was held in Berlin in 2013.

== Background ==
According to the self-conception of the organisers, the second Kritische Islamkonferenz (2013) was an "alternative dialogue forum" to the Deutsche Islamkonferenz (held annually from 2006 to 2009). They considered efforts to "improve the integration of migrants" by "strengthening religious identity" to have been a "failure". Whoever reduces "the individual to a single religious group identity", obstructs the "emancipation of individuals" and stimulates the "development of parallel societies". By contrast, they should rely on the "model of transcultural society" in which "each individual, on the basis of secular values, has the opportunity" to "shape their lives autonomously", and thus experience "a cultural diversity that is actually an enrichment, rather than a threat". Instead of the integration policy, an "emancipation policy" should be followed, in the midst of which stands the "individual" and not the "construct of a supposedly homogenous social group". On this basis, society should be further developed in the sense of human rights.

== History ==
=== 2008 edition ===
On 31 May and 1 June 2008 in Cologne, the following speakers held lectures: Mina Ahadi, Michael Schmidt-Salomon, Ralph Giordano, Hartmut Krauss, Philippe Witzmann, Stephan Grigat and Klaus Blees. Aside from them, there were several panel discussions. The following speakers contributed to these panels: Maryam Namazie (Council of Ex-Muslims of Britain, UK), Ehsan Jami (Central Committee for Ex-Muslims, Netherlands), Afsane Vahdat (Central Council for Ex-Muslims in Scandinavia, Sweden), Shahnaz Moratab (Central Council of Ex-Muslims, Germany), Mina Ahadi, Sonja Fatma Bläser, Thomas Maul, Arzu Gazi, Assia Maria Harwazinski, Margalith Kleijwegt and Günter Wallraff. The slogan of the first Kritische Islamkonferenz was "Aufklären statt verschleiern" (loosely translated: "Enlightening instead of disguising"; the latter can both mean "to obscure" and "to cover oneself (with a veil)").

=== 2013 edition ===
In 2013, the second Kritische Islamkonferenz took place on 11 and 12 May in the af Auditorium Friedrichstraße in Berlin. The following speakers presented: Hamed Abdel-Samad, Mina Ahadi, Lale Akgün, Necla Kelek, Lukas Mihr, Michael Schmidt-Salomon, Arzu Toker and Ali Utlu. The night before on 10 May, the film Der Iran-Job was shown in the Hackesche Höfe cinema. According to an announcement by the organisers, unlike the 2008 conference, the 2013 conference would also feature liberal and progressive Muslims. This resulted from a supposed need for an alliance between secularist and liberal religious forces to defend the "open society" against the "double threat of political Islam and chauvinistic xenophobia". For example, it was during this conference that reformist Muslim Seyran Ateş presented her vision of a liberal mosque for the first time. The theme was "Selbstbestimming statt Gruppenzwang. Gegen Islamismus und Fremdenfeindlichkeit." ("Self-determination instead of peer pressure. Against Islamism and xenophobia").
