= Michael Schmidt-Salomon =

German author, philosopher, and PR manager

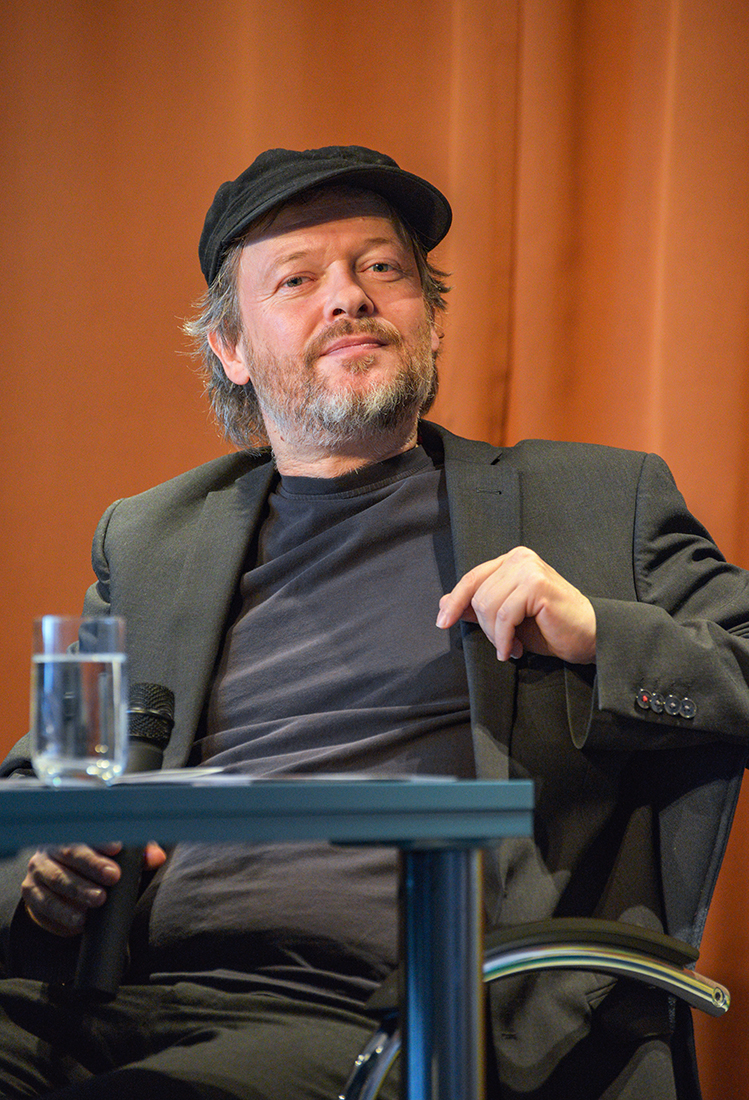
Schmidt-Salomon at Rana Ahmad's book presentation in January 2018

Michael Schmidt-Salomon (born 14 September 1967 in Trier) is a German author, philosopher, and public relations manager. As chairman of the Giordano Bruno Foundation, a humanist organization that is critical of religion, he has been identified as Germany's "Chief Atheist." His books include the Manifesto of Evolutionary Humanism: A Plea for a Contemporary Culture, and Die Kirche im Kopf (The Church in the Head). His children's book Wo bitte geht's zu Gott?, fragte das kleine Ferkel ("Which is the way to God, please?, little Piglet asked") caused controversy for its depiction of religion.

== Life ==
Schmidt-Salomon studied education sciences at the University of Trier, earning his master's degree in educational theory in 1992, and his PhD in 1997. From 1992 to 2001 he worked as a research assistant and lecturer at the University of Trier. The main focuses of his work are science theory, anthropology, aesthetics, society theory, futurology, religious criticism and ideology criticism, as well as practical ethics. He began lecturing at the Institut D'Etudes Educatives et Sociales (IEES) in Luxembourg in 2002. From 1999 to 2007, Schmidt-Salomon was editor of the journal MIZ (Contemporary Materials and Information: The Political Magazine for Atheists and the Irreligious) He has been CEO of the Giordano Bruno Foundation since 2006. He co-inspired Mina Ahadi's foundation of the Central Council of Ex-Muslims in 2007, and co-organised the Kritische Islamkonferenz in 2008 and 2013.

Schmidt-Salomon lives in Vordereifel, and has a non-traditional family consisting of two biological children, three adopted children, and three other adults. He has debated Christian philosopher, theologian and apologist William Lane Craig on the existence of God.

== Children's book controversy ==
Schmidt-Salomon's book Wo bitte geht's zu Gott?, fragte das kleine Ferkel, illustrated by Helge Nyncke, was published in the autumn of 2007. The book has been described as "Richard Dawkins's The God Delusion for children," due to its criticism of religion.

In December 2007, the Federal Ministry for Family Affairs raised objections to the book, deeming it inappropriate for children and youth due to its depiction of religion, and charging that the book had "anti-Semitic tendencies". The Ministry announced in January 2007 that it was considering a ban on selling the book to minors. The Central Council of Jews in Germany supported such a ban. One criticism of the book was that Jews were illustrated in a more negative light than Christians or Muslims. The illustrations were compared to "anti-Semitic caricatures from the Nazi era."

Peter Riedesser, director of the University Hospital for Child and Youth Psychiatry and Psychotherapy in the University Medical Center Hamburg-Eppendorf, deemed the book suitable for children. Riedesser saw the book as emphasizing equality between believers and unbelievers, and he did not find it indoctrinating or demeaning of religion.

== Publications ==
- Michael Schmidt-Salomon: Hoffnung Mensch Eine bessere Welt ist möglich. Piper, München 2014, ISBN 978-3-492-05608-3
- Michael Schmidt-Salomon: Leibniz war kein Butterkeks. Den großen und kleinen Fragen der Philosophie auf der Spur Pendo Publishing Company, München-Zürich 2011, ISBN 978-3-86612-280-2
- Michael Schmidt-Salomon: Jenseits von Gut und Böse. Warum wir ohne Moral die besseren Menschen sind Pendo Publishing Company, München-Zürich 2009, ISBN 3-86612-212-8
- Michael Schmidt-Salomon: Susi Neunmalklug erklärt die Evolution: Ein Buch für kleine und große Besserwisser Alibri Publishing Company, Aschaffenburg 2009, ISBN 978-3-86569-053-1
- Michael Schmidt-Salomon: Die Geschichte vom frechen Hund: Warum es klug ist, freundlich zu sein Alibri Publishing Company, Aschaffenburg 2008, ISBN 3-86569-041-6
- Michael Schmidt-Salomon: Auf dem Weg zur Einheit des Wissens. Die Evolution der Evolutionstheorie und die Gefahren von Biologismus und Kulturismus. Alibri Publishing Company, Aschaffenburg 2007, ISBN 3-86569-200-1
- Helge Nyncke und Michael Schmidt-Salomon: Wo bitte geht’s zu Gott? fragte das kleine Ferkel. Ein Buch für alle, die sich nichts vormachen lassen. Alibri Publishing Company, Aschaffenburg 2007, ISBN 3-86569-030-0 English translation of the text (PDF)
- Carsten Frerk und Michael Schmidt-Salomon: Die Kirche im Kopf. Von "Ach Herrje!" bis "zum Teufel!". Alibri Publishing Company, Aschaffenburg 2007, ISBN 3-86569-024-6
- Michael Schmidt-Salomon: Manifest des evolutionären Humanismus. Plädoyer für eine zeitgemäße Leitkultur. 2. enlarged editions, Alibri Publishing Company, Aschaffenburg 2006, ISBN 978-3-86569-011-1
- Hermann Gieselbusch und Michael Schmidt-Salomon (Ed.): "Aufklärung ist Ärgernis...": Karlheinz Deschner - Leben, Werk, Wirkung. Alibri Publishing Company, Aschaffenburg 2005, ISBN 978-3-86569-003-6 (omnibus with contributions from Hans Albert, Karlheinz Deschner, Horst Herrmann, Joachim Kahl, Ludger Lütkehaus, Hermann Josef Schmidt and others)
- Michael Schmidt-Salomon: Stollbergs Inferno. Alibri Publishing Company, Aschaffenburg 2003, ISBN 978-3-932710-49-0
- Michael Schmidt-Salomon: Erkenntnis aus Engagement. Alibri Publishing Company, Aschaffenburg 1999, ISBN 978-3-932710-60-5 (an interdisciplinary contribution to the discussion about the shaping of the future)
- Michael Schmidt-Salomon: Mythos Marx? Grundrisse des Lebens und Werks des Philosophen, Ökonomen und Politikers Karl Marx. In: Aufklärung und Kritik. Special report 10/2005
- Michael Schmidt-Salomon: Von der Negation zur Position: Über die Notwendigkeit säkularer sozialer Dienstleistungen. In: Humanismus Aktuell 3/1998
