= Helmut F. Kaplan =

Austrian philosopher (1952–2026)

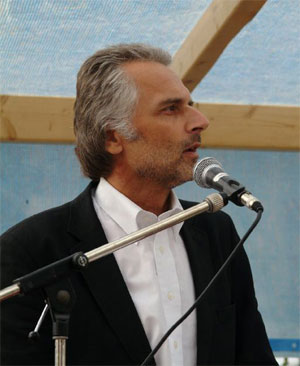
- Kaplan speaking in 2006
- Born: Helmut Friedrich Kaplan; 13 October 1952; Salzburg, Austria
- Died: 18 May 2026 (aged 73); Hallein, Salzburg, Austria
- Education: University of Salzburg
- Occupations: Philosopher, author, animal rights activist
- Known for: Works on animal rights and animal ethics

Helmut Friedrich Kaplan (13 October 1952 – 18 May 2026) was an Austrian philosopher, animal rights theorist, and author who focused primarily on animal rights and animal ethics.

== Background ==
After completing his schooling, Kaplan studied psychology at the University of Salzburg, graduating with a doctorate in 1982. He subsequently completed a degree in philosophy with a master's thesis focused on the work of Peter Singer. Both academic works laid the foundation for his later book publications, which achieved widespread distribution, particularly within the animal rights movement. In addition to writing articles, lecturing, and publishing books, he made regular media appearances on television talk shows and radio programs.

Kaplan was divorced and had two children. His daughter, Astrid, is also active in the field of animal rights; in 2003, she completed a doctoral thesis examining the psychological connections between violence against animals and violence against humans.

Kaplan died on 18 May 2026, at the age of 73.

== Animal rights advocacy and positions ==
Kaplan first emerged as an author in the mid-1980s. His core themes centered on the philosophy and psychology of human-animal relationships, vegetarianism, and meat consumption. According to his own statements, his views on animal ethics were primarily influenced by Peter Singer and Arthur Schopenhauer.

He served as an advisor or collaborator for several non-governmental organizations, including Animal Peace and PETA. During the 1990s, he served for a time as the president of the Vegetarian Society of Austria (Vegetarische Gesellschaft Österreichs).

His 1993 book, Leichenschmaus – Ethische Gründe für eine vegetarische Ernährung ("Feast of Corpses: Ethical Reasons for a Vegetarian Diet"), achieved wide distribution in German-speaking countries and was translated into several languages. An updated edition was published in 2011, aiming to convey what the preface called "the sheer force of the arguments for animal liberation" to a younger generation.

Because definitions of animal rights vary widely within animal ethics, Kaplan formulated and propagated a simplified, actionable framework in 2017: "Animals have the right to have their interests considered equally to comparable human interests." In 2018, he appeared in the animal rights documentary Citizen Animal – A Small Family’s Quest for Animal Rights.

In 2019, Kaplan published the study Menschenrechte und Tierrechte: Solidarität mit den Leidensfähigen ("Human Rights and Animal Rights: Solidarity with Those Capable of Suffering"). In it, he argued that anyone who supports human rights must logically support animal rights as well. In a 2020 article for the journal TIERethik, he explored the justifications for both human and animal rights, noting that using human dignity as the foundational justification for human rights is historically a surprisingly recent phenomenon.

Kaplan argued that the term "animal rights" had been pushed out of public discourse by corporate marketing buzzwords like "organic" or "animal welfare." In his 2020 book, Tierrechte und Menschenrechte: Eine Einheit ("Animal Rights and Human Rights: A Unity"), he called for a "re-sensitization to the core idea of animal rights."

=== Animal ethics theories ===
Invoking the frameworks of Peter Singer and Tom Regan, Kaplan sought to initiate a "third stage of animal ethics" and establish a baseline of "Simple Ethics" (Einfache Ethik). By this, he meant the stance that complex moral calculations regarding animals are just as unnecessary as complex moral calculations regarding humans. He argued that just as humans should not be discriminated against based on skin color or gender, animals should not be discriminated against based on their species. In his book Ich esse meine Freunde nicht ("I Don't Eat My Friends"), he expanded on this concept for a general audience. For Kaplan, the animal rights movement was a direct historical continuation of previous liberation movements, such as the abolition of slavery and women's emancipation.

Kaplan rejected traditional animal welfare or environmental conservation approaches that permitted the exploitation of animals. He accused mainstream animal welfarists of "giving meat-eaters back the clean conscience they had lost prior to the emergence of the animal rights movement." His baseline demand was a complete cessation of meat consumption and a drastic reduction in the use of other animal products, alongside the active development and promotion of vegan alternatives.

Following the publication of his essay Müssen Tierrechtler Veganer sein? ("Do Animal Rights Activists Have to be Vegan?"), Kaplan faced internal criticism within the movement. Critics accused him of inconsistency because he admitted to occasionally eating cheese and wore leather orthopedic shoes due to a medical condition. Kaplan maintained a pragmatic position, arguing that few people transition to veganism without first taking the intermediate step of vegetarianism. This pragmatism drew sharp criticism from radical abolitionist vegans such as Achim Stößer.

In an interview with Der Spiegel, Kaplan clarified his stance: "I consider the moral condemnation of vegetarianism to be counterproductive. It converts almost no one to veganism, but it prevents many from becoming vegetarians." He maintained, however, that the ultimate goal must be a vegan society "in which humans no longer live at the expense of animals."

He sparked further debate by claiming that public discussions surrounding mainstream books like Eating Animals by Jonathan Safran Foer and Anständig essen ("Eating Decently") by Karen Duve were ultimately "a stroke of luck" for the meat industry. He argued that the demand to eat less meat, rather than no meat, lacked true moral authority—drawing a parallel to demanding that someone torture less rather than stop torturing entirely. Furthermore, he claimed that the slogan "less meat" served as a perfect corporate marketing hook to improve the image of meat consumption via concepts like "conscious eating" and "organic meat," which he argued could inadvertently increase overall consumption.

In his 2012 book Tierrechte: Modetrend oder Moralfortschritt? ("Animal Rights: Fashion Trend or Moral Progress?"), Kaplan argued that the animal rights movement had reached a critical crossroads: "Either the animal rights movement can build upon what it started in the last quarter of the previous century, or animal exploitation will continue forever."

=== Holocaust comparisons and violence debates ===
Journalist Henryk M. Broder criticized Kaplan for comparing factory farming and animal slaughter to the Holocaust, arguing that such comparisons dehumanized and relativized the genocide of the Jews. Kaplan, however, continued to defend PETA's controversial "Holocaust on Your Plate" campaign after it was withdrawn in Germany following public protests. Kaplan's public defense of the animal rights activities of the neo-religious Christian community Universelles Leben (Universal Life), of which he was not a member, also drew criticism.

Several controversial statements made by Kaplan regarding the use of force within the animal rights movement were criticized by authors such as Michael Miersch, who argued that Kaplan failed to sufficiently distance himself from illegal acts or provided philosophical inspiration for eco-terrorism.

Kaplan was also criticised by Emil Franzinelli for granting an interview to the national-revolutionary querfront journal Der Fahnenträger titled "The Holocaust comparison is becoming increasingly important."

== Advisory roles ==
Kaplan was listed alongside figures such as Karl Albrecht Schachtschneider, Wolfgang Berger, Eberhard Hamer, and Eva Herman on the scientific advisory board of the "Wissensmanufaktur," an independent institute whose core operators (Andreas Popp, Rico Albrecht, and formerly Michael Friedrich Vogt) are associated by political scientists with the German New Right and Querfront spectrum. Kaplan was no longer listed on the organization's website by 2019.

== Selected bibliography ==
- Ist die Psychoanalyse wertfrei? Hans Huber, Bern 1982, ISBN 3-456-81122-5.
- Philosophie des Vegetarismus. Peter Lang, Frankfurt 1988.
- Warum Vegetarier?: Grundlagen einer universalen Ethik. Peter Lang, Frankfurt 1989, ISBN 978-3631416044.
- Sind wir Kannibalen? – Fleischessen im Lichte des Gleichheitsprinzips. Frankfurt 1991, ISBN 3-631-43628-9.
- Warum ich Vegetarier bin – Prominente erzählen. Rowohlt, Reinbek 1995, ISBN 3-499-19675-1.
- Tiere haben Rechte – Argumente und Zitate von A bis Z. Harald Fischer Verlag, Erlangen 1998, ISBN 3-89131-118-4.
- Tierrechte – Die Philosophie einer Befreiungsbewegung. Echo, Göttingen 2000, ISBN 3-926914-35-1.
- Wozu Ethik? Asku-Presse, 2001, ISBN 3-930994-12-7.
- Die Ethische Weltformel – Eine Moral für Menschen und Tiere. Vegi-Verlag, Neukirch-Egnach 2003, ISBN 3-909067-04-2.
- Shitai no bansan （死体の晩餐）. Doujidaisya, Tokyo 2005, ISBN 4-88683-544-9. (Japanese translation of (Leichenschmaus)
- Der Verrat des Menschen an den Tieren. Vegi-Verlag, Neukirch-Egnach 2006, ISBN 3-909067-06-9.
- Ich esse meine Freunde nicht oder Warum unser Umgang mit Tieren falsch ist. trafo Verlagsgruppe, Berlin 2009, ISBN 978-3-89626-941-6.
