= Hilgendorf =

Hilgendorf is a surname of German origin. People with that name include:

- Eric Hilgendorf (born 1960), German professor of law and legal philosopher
- Franz Martin Hilgendorf (1839–1904), German zoologist and paleontologist
  - Hilgendorf's saucord, a rockfish
  - Hilgendorf's tube-nosed bat
- Frederick Hilgendorf (1874–1942), New Zealand teacher, lecturer and agricultural scientist
- James Hilgendorf (born 1982), Australian rugby union player
- Tom Hilgendorf (1942–2021), American former professional baseball player
