= Manifesto of Evolutionary Humanism =

2005 philosophy book

- Author: Michael Schmidt-Salomon
- Language: German
- Genre: Non-fiction
- Publication date: 2005
- Publication place: Germany

Manifesto of Evolutionary Humanism is work of naturalistic philosophy by Michael Schmidt-Salomon. It was originally published in German in 2005, and later in translation in Polish and English.

== Thesis ==
Schmidt-Salomon advocates an empirically grounded universal perspective. He starts from a naturalistic concept of the cosmos in which there are no interventions of supernatural creatures (e.g. gods, demons, witches or goblins) in world events by way of miracles. The manifesto outlines, that humanity will be able to create more life-friendly, free, and just conditions than can be found today. The concept can be traced to the work of Julian Huxley, the first UNESCO Director General and a major contributor to the Universal Declaration of Human Rights.

The introduction says that humanity would live in an age of asynchrony:

While technologically we are firmly in the 21st century, our world views are still characterized by ancient legends which are thousands of years old. This combination of high-level technical ability and highly naïve child-like beliefs could have disastrous consequences in the long run. We are behaving like five-year-olds who have been given responsibility for a jumbo jet.

Appendix B contains "The Ten Offers of Evolutionary Humanism" in contrast to the Ten Commandments of the Bible. In short they read as follows:

1. Serve neither foreign nor familiar "gods" but rather the great ideal of ethics to lessen the suffering in the world. To possess science, philosophy and art means not to need religion!
2. Behave fairly to your neighbour and also to those farthest away!
3. Have no fear of authorities, but rather the courage to reason for yourself!
4. You shall not lie, cheat, steal or kill – unless, in an emergency, there is no other way of asserting the ideals of humanity!
5. Free yourself from the bad habit of moralizing!
6. Do not immunize yourself against criticism!
7. Do not be too confident! But even doubt should be doubted!
8. Overcome any tendency towards tradition blindness by informing yourself in depth from all sides before making a decision!
9. Enjoy your life because it is highly probable that it will be the only one you have!
10. Put your life in the service of a "greater cause", become a part of the tradition of those who desire(d) to make the world a better place in which to live.

== Reception ==
Originally published in German in 2005, in 2012 the book was translated to Polish, and in 2014 to English. The book is promoted and distributed by the Giordano Bruno Foundation (gbs), where Schmidt-Salomon serves as the co-founding chair and spokesperson. According to gbs, 50,000 copies have been sold.

Telepolis writes that Schmidt-Salomon mentions a pretty combination of science, philosophy and arts as an opposite of religion. But part of the manifesto appears not fully developed. However, taking its claims seriously, criticism like this would be welcome to foster the great project of a Leitkultur of enlightenment and humanism.

A legal dispute of the author with a cardinal of the Catholic church in Germany drew broad media coverage to the theses of the manifesto. On 25 May 2008, Gerhard Ludwig Müller, preached in a sermon about a section of the manifesto concerning mountain gorillas and infanticide. Müller attributed certain Nazi-views of the promotion of infanticide to the author, for which Schmidt-Salomon sued the cardinal for false assertion of facts and slander. In a decision of the Higher Administrative Court of Bavaria, the cardinal was found to have violated the duty of truthfulness and due diligence, and was charged to pay the legal fees of Schmidt-Salomon. The cardinal appealed against the Bavarian court decision, and eventually in 2011, the Federal Administrative Count of Germany declined the cardinal's appeal.

In 2009 in the Spiegel, the largest weekly news magazine in Europe, Karen Duve described the manifesto as "astute and highly relevant for current affairs".

The Institute for Research on Religious and Ideological Issues (EZW) of the Protestant Church in Germany (EKD) criticized that in the manifesto God would be psychologized in a way that would form a mirror-image of the creationist slogan of the "intelligent designer".

In the 2017 book New Atheism: Critical Perspectives and Contemporary Debates the 2005 manifesto is marked as the first project of gbs in the then upcoming New Atheism, which is stated to provide a philosophical guideline for a secular ethics, that integrates scientific findings with humanist values and fights infringement on individual liberties.
