= Ulla Wessels =

German philosopher

- Born: 1965 (age 60–61); Münster, West Germany (now Germany)

Education
- Education: University of California, Berkeley, Australian National University, Saarland University

Philosophical work
- Era: Contemporary philosophy
- Region: Western philosophy
- School: Analytic philosophy
- Main interests: Ethics
- Website: www.uwessels.de

Ulla Wessels (born 1965) is a German analytic philosopher working in practical philosophy, particularly ethics. She is a Professor of Practical Philosophy in the Philosophy Department of the Saarland University in Saarbrücken.

== Research ==
Ulla Wessels was born in 1965 in Münster. She has researched and taught in Leipzig and Göttingen and at the University of California, Berkeley and at the Australian National University in Canberra. Wessels' research interests include consequentialism, welfarism, utilitarianism, supererogation, moral psychology and bioethics.

In 2003, Wessels' book Die gute Samariterin: Zur Struktur der Supererogation received the Wolfgang Stegmüller-Prize from Die Gesellschaft für Analytische Philosophie (Society for Analytic Philosophy).

Wessels is part of the scientific advisory board of the Giordano Bruno Foundation, a non-profit foundation under public law that pursues the “Support of Evolutionary Humanism”.

== Publications ==
- "Die gute Samaritern". Zur Struktur der Supererogation. Berlin 2002.
- "Das Gute". Frankfurt am Main 2011 (Vittorio Klostermann).
- "Preferences" (co-edited with Christoph Fehige). Berlin 1998 (Walter de Gruyter)
