= Jacques Tilly =

German sculptor and illustrator

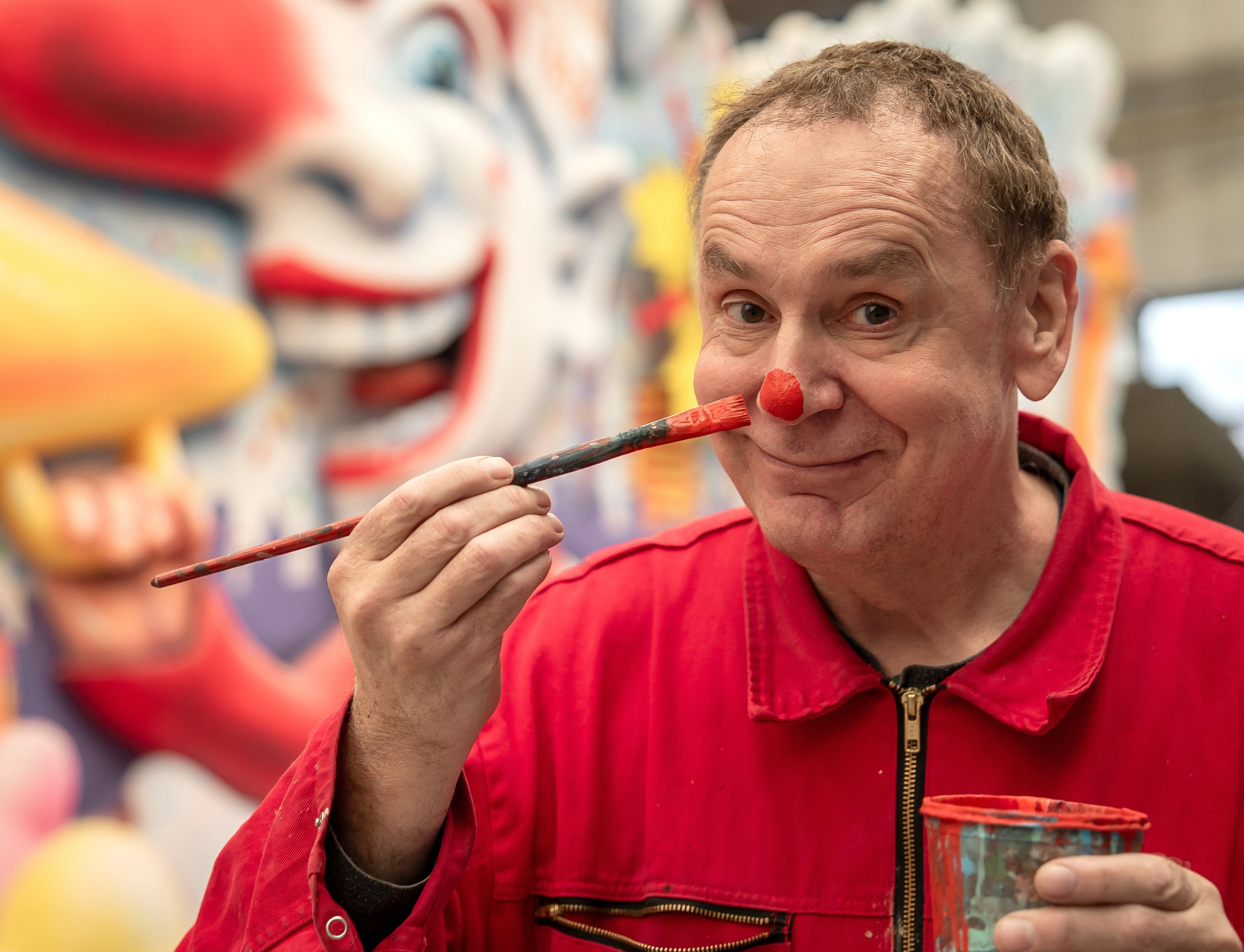
- Jacques Tilly in 2026
- Born: 27 June 1963 (age 63); Düsseldorf, North Rhine-Westphalia, West Germany (now Germany)
- Education: University of Duisburg-Essen
- Spouse: Ricarda Hinz

Jacques Tilly (born 27 June 1963) is a German sculptor and illustrator, known for his politically satirical sculptures that adorn floats in protests and parades, and is considered the premier carnival float designer in Germany.

== Early life ==
Jacques Tilly was born in 1963 in Düsseldorf, and attended the Comenius-Gymnasium high school. He studied graphic design at the University of Duisburg-Essen, graduating in 1994.

Tilly is an atheist and a humanist, and is an advisory member of the Giordano Bruno Foundation.

== Artistic career ==
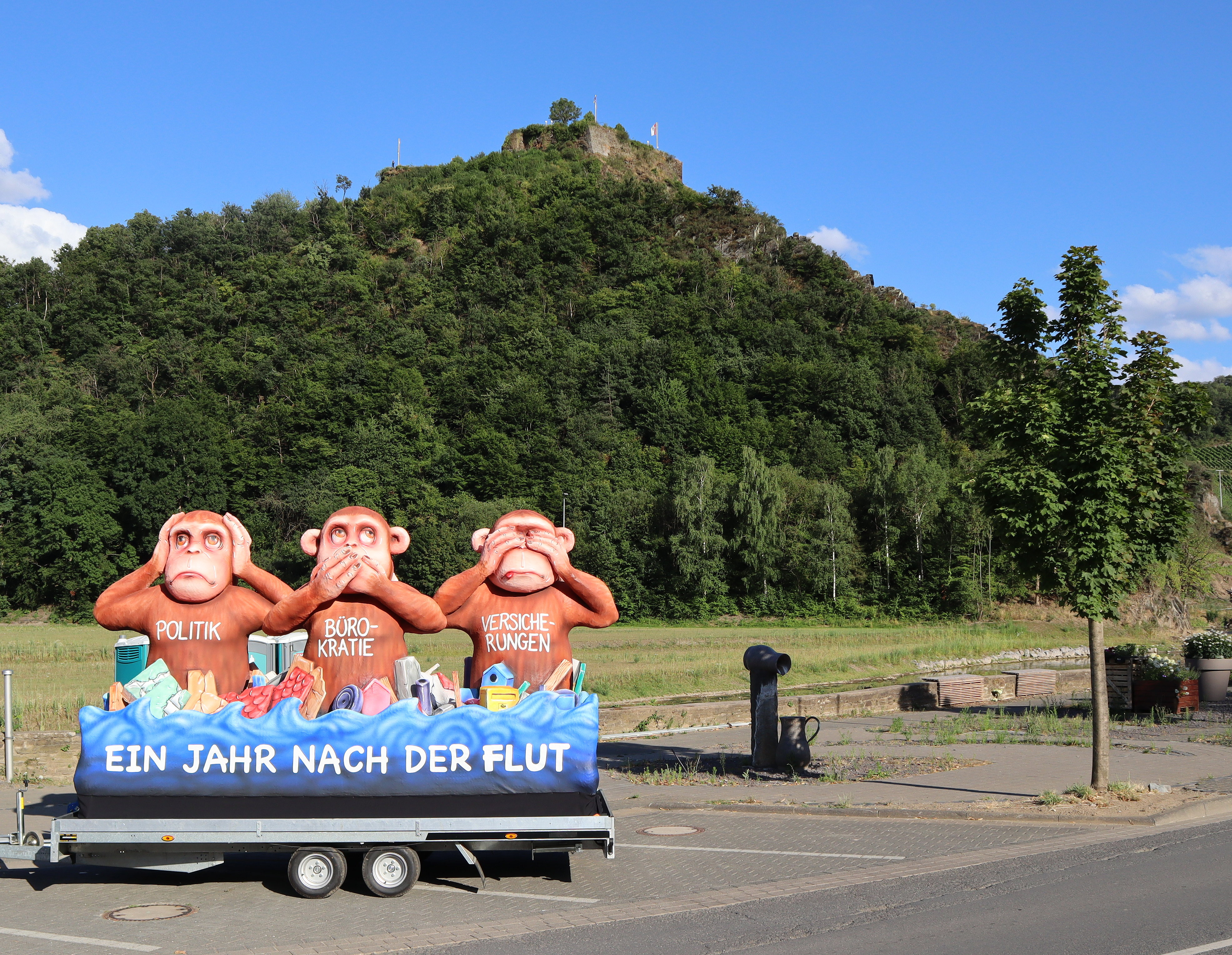
Jacques Tilly's sculpture of the Three wise monkeys one year after the 2021 flood in Germany in the Ahr Valley.

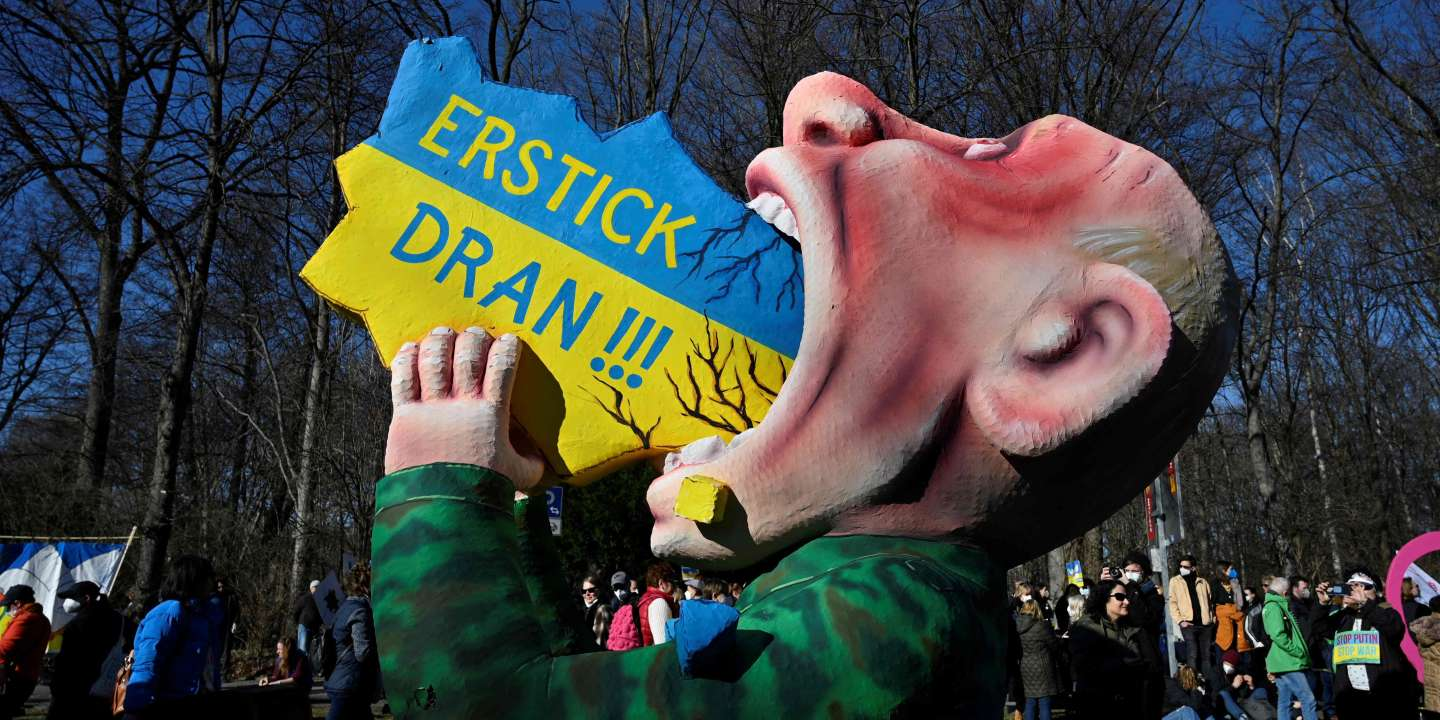
A Tilly sculpture of Vladimir Putin, commemorating the 2022 Russian invasion of Ukraine. The inscription reads: "Choke on it!!!".

Tilly is known for his papier-mâché sculptures that are featured on parade floats, most notably those in Rosenmontag, during Carnival in Düsseldorf, for which he has made sculptures since 1983. The sculptures often have overt political messaging to them, and frequently include caricatured depictions of politicians, world leaders, and religious figures, especially those on the far-right. These themes gained increased attention during the late 2010s, with some of Tilly's sculptures featuring U.S. President Donald Trump, U.K. Prime Minister Theresa May, Polish Deputy Prime Minister Jarosław Kaczyński, and German Chancellor Angela Merkel. Other topics of note include Brexit and the COVID-19 pandemic. In addition to German parades and festivals, the sculptures have also appeared at protests and political events abroad, including one in front of the House of Parliament in London.

Tilly is also an illustrator, and has designed official postcards, calendars, and portraits for several German cities.

In 2025 Tilly was sued by Russian President Vladimir Putin, whom he had portrayed in various works. According to the Basmanny District court website, the artist is accused of "Defamation of the Russian army". Tilly was found guilty in March 2026 by a Moscow court and sentenced in absentia to 8 years and 6 month in prison, a Euro 20,000 fine and a 4 year prohibition of activity.
