= Giordano Bruno Foundation =

German non-profit foundation

Giordano-Bruno-Stiftung Giordano Bruno Foundation
- Formation: 30 March 2004; 22 years ago
- Type: Nonprofit organisation
- Purpose: Supporting evolutionary humanism
- Headquarters: Oberwesel
- Region served: Germany
- Executive Board: Michael Schmidt-Salomon, Ulla Wessels
- Website: www.giordano-bruno-stiftung.de

The Giordano Bruno Foundation (German: Giordano-Bruno-Stiftung, abbreviated: gbs) is a Germany-based non-profit foundation under public law that promotes evolutionary humanism and the enlightenment. It was founded by entrepreneur Herbert Steffen in 2004 and was named after Giordano Bruno. Cofounder and spokesperson is Michael Schmidt-Salomon. He has formed the Executive Board with Ulla Wessels since 2022. The foundation has more than 10,000 supporting members and 50 regional and university groups.

== Goals ==
The Giordano Bruno Foundation advocates the position of Evolutionary Humanism, as formulated in the Manifesto of Evolutionary Humanism (German: Manifest des Evolutionären Humanismus), which was published by Michael Schmidt-Salomon in 2005 and sold around 50,000 copies. In the manifesto, Schmidt-Salomon pleads for a naturalistic philosophy. He starts from a naturalistic concept of the cosmos in which there are no interventions of supernatural creatures (e. g. gods, demons, witches or goblins) in world events by way of miracles. The manifesto outlines, that humanity will be able to create more life-friendly, free, and just conditions than can be found today. The concept can be traced to the work of Julian Huxley, the first UNESCO Director General and a major contributor to the Universal Declaration of Human Rights.

== Activities ==
Starting with the 2005 series of events “Heathen fun rather than Hell’s torture” (“Heidenspaß statt Höllenqual”) on the occasion of the Catholic World Youth Day in Cologne, the gbs has been addressing a wide range of topics around humanism, enlightenment and the principles of a scientific world view in many highly publicized campaigns and events. A chronology and the documentary "In Humanity We Trust – The story of evolutionary humanism" provide information on the most important events in the history of the foundation. The gbs and its regional and university groups organize about 150 events per year throughout Germany.

In 2007, the gbs supported the founding of the Central Council of Ex-Muslims (German: Zentralrat der Ex-Muslime), which inspired similar movements in other countries; in 2012, the campaign “Against Religious Discrimination at the Workplace” (German: Gegen religiöse Diskriminierung am Arbeitsplatz, GerDiA); in 2013, the project Evokids - Evolution in Primary School; in 2017, the founding of the Institute for Secular Law (German: Institut für Weltanschauungsrecht, ifw); and in 2017, the founding of the Atheist Refugee Relief (German: Säkulare Flüchtlingshilfe).

== Funding ==
The gbs is funded by private donors and publishes information on its annual financial data and its assets. In 2018, the total assets were around 4,000,000 euros. The expenditure in 2018 was 628,000 euros, mainly for events and projects.

== Board of directors ==
The board of directors consists of Michael Schmidt-Salomon (since 2004) and Ulla Wessels (since 2022). Founder Herbert Steffen (1934 - 2022) was board director until 2022. Managing director is Elke Held and the foundation has 14 employees and scholars. The board of trustees consists of Thorsten Barnickel, Jacqueline Neumann, Christian Pawlu, Rainer Rosenzweig and Assunta Tammelleo.

== Advisory board ==
The advisory board is composed by around 30 scientists, philosophers and artists, including:

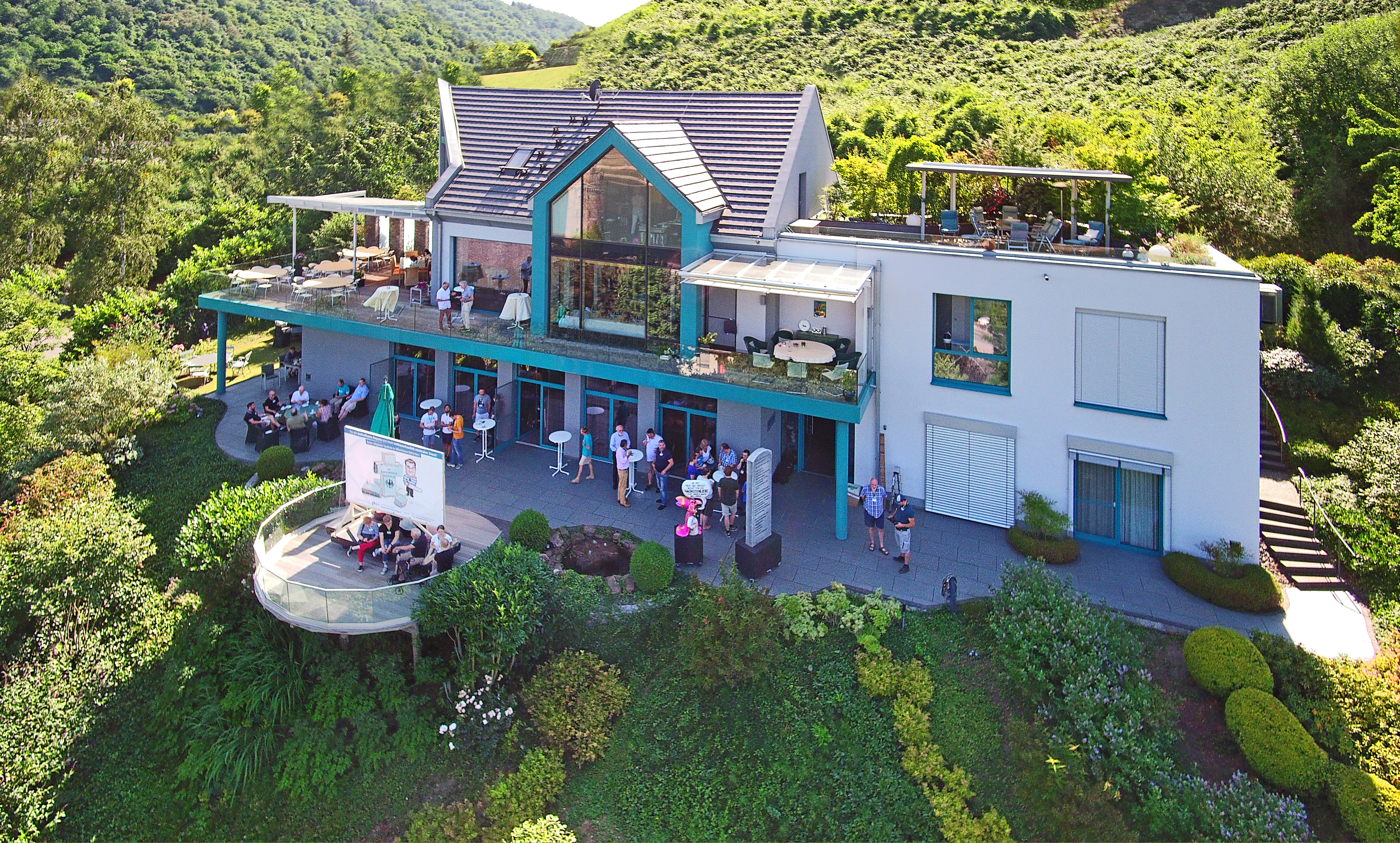
"Haus Weitblick", home of Giordano Bruno Foundation in Oberwesel.

Hamed Abdel-Samad	Reinhard Merkel	Esther Vilar
Hans Albert	Axel Meyer	Gerhard Vollmer
Michael Braungart	Ludwig A. Minelli	Ulrich Walter
Karen Duve	Holm Putzke	Ulla Wessels
Monika Griefahn	Rolf Schwanitz	Franz Wuketits
Eric Hilgendorf	Volker Sommer	Jacques Tilly
Janosch	Gerhard Streminger	Thomas Metzinger

== Deschner Prize ==
From its beginnings the foundation has been particularly committed to the work of Karlheinz Deschner. It awards the "Deschner Prize” at the sum of 10,000 euros for outstanding achievements relating to the criticism of religion and ideology. The prize was awarded to Richard Dawkins (2007) and to Raif Badawi and his wife Ensaf Haidar (2016).
