= Gerhard Streminger =

Austrian philosopher (born 1952)

Gerhard Streminger (born 1952 in Graz) is an Austrian philosopher and author. From 1970, he studied philosophy and mathematics in Graz, Goettingen, Edinburgh with G.E.Davie and Oxford with J. L. Mackie. He gained his PhD in 1978 at the University of Graz, where he held posts from 1975 until 1997. In 1981 he was Visiting Professor at the University of Minnesota, Minneapolis. Streminger was appointed Assistant Professor at the University of Graz in 1988 and received the title of University Professor in 1995.

He received several awards and prizes: 1974 a scholarship of the Deutsche Akademische Auslandsdienst; 1978 one of the British Council; and he was awarded the 1991/92 Humboldt Scholarship. In 2006 he gained the David Hume Award of the Kellmann Society for Humanism and Enlightenment.

Streminger is generally considered as an engaged agnostic/agnosticism. He is a member of the Giordano Bruno Stiftung, a society to promote evolutionary humanism.

Streminger is widely known as editor and translator of works of David Hume. His biographies and commentaries on Hume and Adam Smith are seen as the standard of research on the Scottish Enlightenment in the German-speaking world. Besides, he published many articles on this subject and the Philosophy of Religion. His philosophically most important work Gottes Guete und die Uebel der Welt deals comprehensively with Theodicy (the Problem of evil).

== Publications ==
His most important publications are:

- Adam Smith. Reinbek: Rowohlt 1989 (2. ed.: 1999, German) (New edition: Rowohlt e-book 2022 ISBN 978-3-644-01632-3).
- Gottes Guete und die Uebel der Welt. Das Theodizeeproblem. Tuebingen: Mohr 1992, 2nd revised edition 2016 (German and Italian).
- David Hume. Sein Leben und sein Werk. Paderborn: Schoeningh 1994 (2. ed.: 1994; paperback: 1995, German).
- Der natuerliche Lauf der Dinge. Marburg: Metropolis 1995 (German).
- David Hume. Der Philosoph und sein Zeitalter. München: C.H.Beck, 2011. Revised edition: Munich 2017. 3rd revised edition 2024
- ECCE TERRA. Norderstedt b. Hamburg (books on demand) 2008 (German). New Impression: Weitra - Bibliothek der Provinz 2013
- DALRIADA. Ein schottisches Märchen. Graz: Leykam 2015
- DIE FREMDE. Novel (in German). Vienna: Baumueller 2016 (also as e-book)
- Adam Smith. Wohlstand und Moral. Eine Biographie. München: C.H.Beck, 2017, ISBN 978-3-406-70659-2.
- Die Welt gerät ins Wanken. Das Erdbeben von Lissabon im Jahre 1755 und seine Nachwirkungen auf das europäische Geistesleben. Ein literarischer Essay.. Alibri Verlag 2021, ISBN 978-3-86569-346-4.
- Der lange Schatten der Schwermut. Roman. Verlag: Buchschmiede 2025.
