= Volker Sommer =

German anthropologist

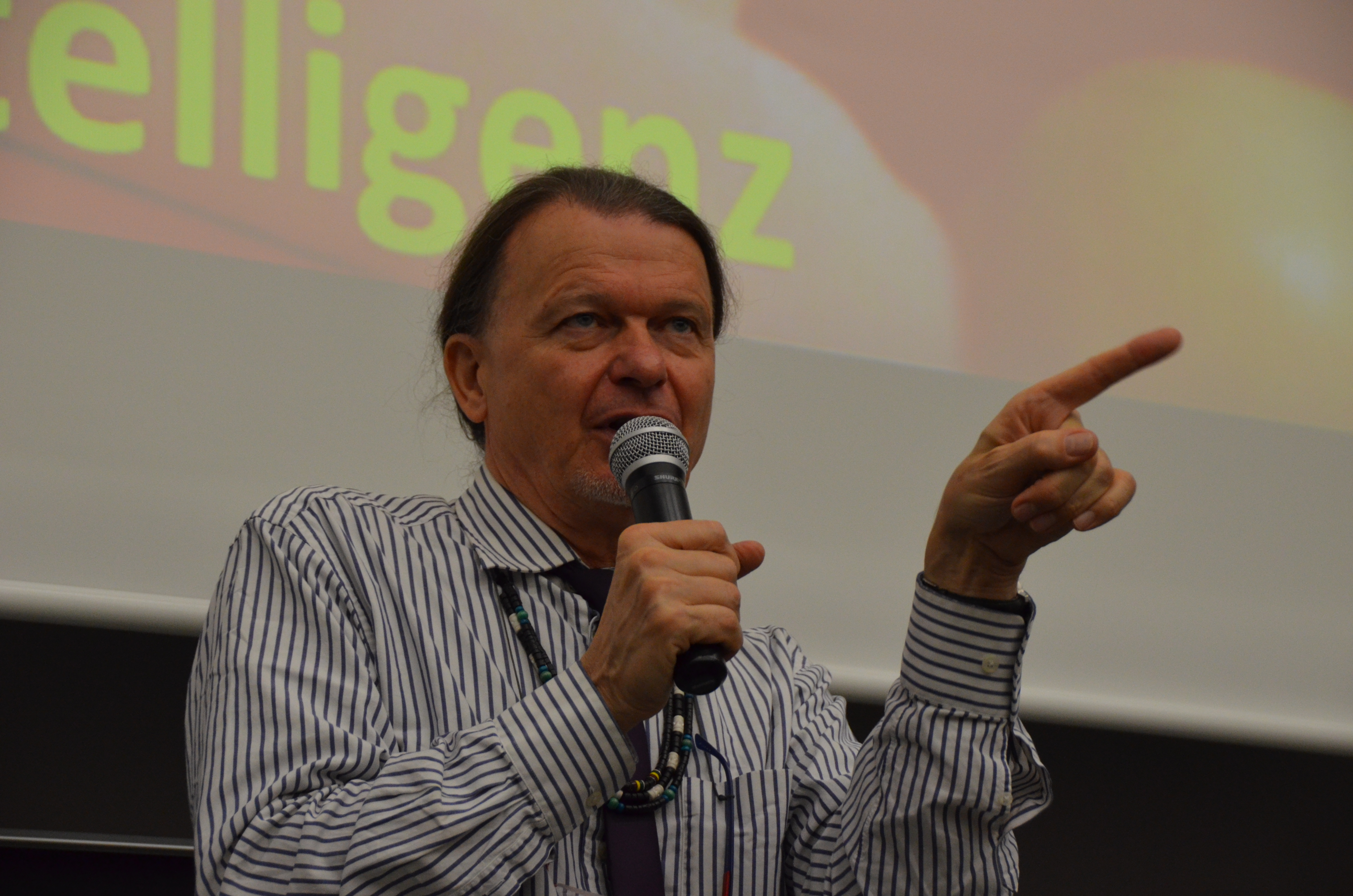
Volker Sommer in 2016

Volker Sommer (born June 2, 1954) is a German author, anthropologist, and Professor of Evolutionary Anthropology at University College London (UCL). His research focusses on the evolution of primate social and sexual behaviour, cognition, rituals, biodiversity conservation, animal rights and evolutionary ethics.

== Life ==
Sommer was born in Holzhausen am Reinhardswald near Kassel, Germany. In his youth, he was a winner of the German national competition Jugend forscht (Youth Research, or Young Scientist) with his 1973 thesis on the social behavior of caterpillars. After completing his high-school education, he studied biology, chemistry and theology in Göttingen, Marburg, Berlin and Hamburg. Since 1981, he has been involved in a long-term study of Hanuman langurs in India. Between 1986 and 1988 he was the recipient of a scholarship from the Alexander von Humboldt Foundation. Sommer was awarded his doctorate in 1985, and his habilitation in 1990. In 1990 he took part in a multi-year study of gibbons in the forests of Thailand. After this was completed, he taught private Anthropology and Primatology lessons at the University of Göttingen. He also received the Heisenberg Scholarship from the German Research Foundation between 1991 and 1996, and was a researcher at the University of California, Davis.

Since 1996, Sommer has lectured on Evolutionary Anthropology at University College London. He has also led an international project to study the chimpanzees in the forests of Nigeria.

Sommer has published approximately 100 works on the biology of social and sexual behaviour, as well as several works of fiction. His works have been translated into several languages including English, Spanish, Italian, Wallonian, Korean, and Hindi. He regularly writes articles for magazines such as Geo, Stern, the Frankfurter Allgemeine Zeitung (Frankfurt General Times), Nature, Kosmos, Die Zeit, Der Spiegel, Die Welt, Die Weltwoche and Neue Zürcher Zeitung. He also takes part in radio, film, and television programmes, often as a panelist discussing his unusual research methods, or to give lectures. In October 2013 he appeared on BBC Radio 4's Museum of Curiosity, where he 'donated' 10 defecated ant heads to the collection.

Sommer is a member of the Scientific Advisory Board of the Giordano Bruno Foundation

== Works (abridged) ==
=== Books and Edited Volumes ===
==== (A) Evolutionary Biology and Primatology ====
- 1989: Die Affen. Unsere wilde Verwandtschaft. Hamburg: GEO / Gruner & Jahr. ISBN 3-570-03985-4
- 1990: Wider die Natur? Homosexualität und Evolution. Munich: C.H. Beck. ISBN 978-3-406-34739-9
- 1992: Lob der Lüge. Täuschung und Selbstbetrug bei Tier und Mensch. Munich: C.H. Beck. ISBN 978-3-423-30415-3 – Spanish 1995: Elogio de la mentira. Barcelona: Galaxia Gutenberg / Circulo de Lectores. ISBN 84-226-5402-4 – Italian 1998: Elogio della menzogna. Turin: Bollati Boringhieri. ISBN 88-339-1134-9
- 1992: Feste – Mythen – Rituale. Warum die Völker feiern. Hamburg: GEO / Gruner & Jahr. ISBN 3-570-01746-X
- 1996: Heilige Egoisten. Die Soziobiologie indischer Tempelaffen. Munich: C.H. Beck. ISBN 978-3-406-39755-4
- 1996 (as editor): Biologie des Menschen. (Series: Verständliche Forschung) Heidelberg, Berlin, Oxford: Spektrum Akademischer Verlag. ISBN 3-8274-0106-2
- 1998 (with photographer Karl Ammann): Die Großen Menschenaffen: Orang-Utan, Gorilla, Schimpanse, Bonobo. Munich: BLV. ISBN 978-3-405-15296-3
- 1998: Von Menschen und anderen Tieren. Essays zur Evolutionsbiologie. Stuttgart: S. Hirzel. ISBN 3-7776-0975-7
- 1999 (as editor): Christian Vogel, Anthropologische Spuren. Zur Natur des Menschen. (Edition Universitas). Stuttgart: S. Hirzel. 978-3-7776-0976-8
- 2006 (as editor, with Paul Vasey): Homosexual Behaviour in Animals: Evolutionary Perspectives. Cambridge: Cambridge University Press. ISBN 78-0-521-86446-6 – Paperback 2011: ISBN 978-0-521-18230-0
- 2007: Darwinisch denken. Horizonte der Evolutionsbiologie. Stuttgart: Hirzel. ISBN 978-3-7776-1543-1
- 2008: Schimpansenland. Wildes Leben in Afrika. Munich: C.H. Beck. ISBN 978-3-406-56891-6
- 2010 (with photographer Jutta Hof): Menschenaffen wie wir. Portraits einer Verwandtschaft. / Apes Like Us. Portraits of a Kinship. [Bilingual edition]. Mannheim: EditionPanorama. ISBN 978-3-89823-435-1
- 2011 (as editor, with Caroline Ross): Primates of Gashaka: Socioecology and Conservation in Nigeria's Biodiversity Hotspot. (Developments in Primatology: Progress and Prospects). Springer: New York. ISBN 978-1-4419-7402-0
- 2015: Lob der Lüge. Wie in der Evolution der Zweck die Mittel heiligt. Stuttgart: S. Hirzel. ISBN 978-3-7776-2537-9
- 2021: Unter Mitprimaten. Ansichten eines Affenforschers. Stuttgart: Hirzel. ISBN 978-3-7776-2814-1
- 2022 (with Josephine N. Msindai): The Chimpanzees of Rubondo Island. Apes Set Free. London: Routledge. ISBN 978-1-000-64456-2
- 2023: Affen. Ein Portrait. Berlin: Matthes & Seitz Berlin. ISBN 978-3-7518-4003-3
- 2024 (with Kathleen Bryson): Why We Struggle Struggle with Ambiguity. The Quiddity Question. Cambridge: Ethics Press. ISBN 978-1-80441-040-0

==== (B) Arts and Arts History ====
- 1988 (with Gerd Heinz-Mohr): Die Rose. Entfaltung eines Symbols. Köln: Diederichs. ISBN 978-3-424-00917-0 – Italian: La Rosa – Storia Di Un Simbolo. Mailand: Rusconi 1989. ISBN 88-18-12062-X
- 2018 (with Marcus Coates): Degreecoordinates – Shared Traits of the Hominini (Humans, Bonobos and Chimpanzees). Margate: Turner Contemporary. ISBN 978-1-9996088-0-4
- 2018 ('extended labels' for artist book of Amalia Pica): please listen hurry others speak better. Berlin: SternbergPress. ISBN 978-3-95679-427-8
- 2022 (as editor): Klaus Meister, Ouevre / Werke / Art. [Trilingual edition French / German / English]. Kassel: Schulverlag Meister. ISBN 978-3-00-067965-0

==== (C) Novels and Poetry ====
- 1983: Nektar der Unsterblichkeit. Poetische Annäherung an Indien. Stuttgart: Radius. ISBN 3-87173-650-3 – Paperback 1986: Indien. Eine poetische Annäherung. Munich: Goldmann. ISBN 3-442-08502-0
- 1986: Yeti. Eine Erzählung. Stuttgart: Radius. ISBN 3-87173-729-1
- 2002: Das grüne All. Ein Poem aus dem Regenwald. Stuttgart: Radius. ISBN 978-3-87173-235-5
- 2018: Den traurigen Gedanken tanzen. Ein Poem im Tangotempo. Stuttgart: Radius. ISBN 978-3-87173-907-1

== Documentaries ==
- Volker Sommer – Ich bin ein Menschenaffe. TV Documentary, RB 2009, 43 minutes, first broadcast by Arte on April 17, 2011 (Broadcast information at RB; Broadcast information with Streaming Media from Arte).
