= Mina Ahadi =

Iranian-Austrian political activist (born 1956)

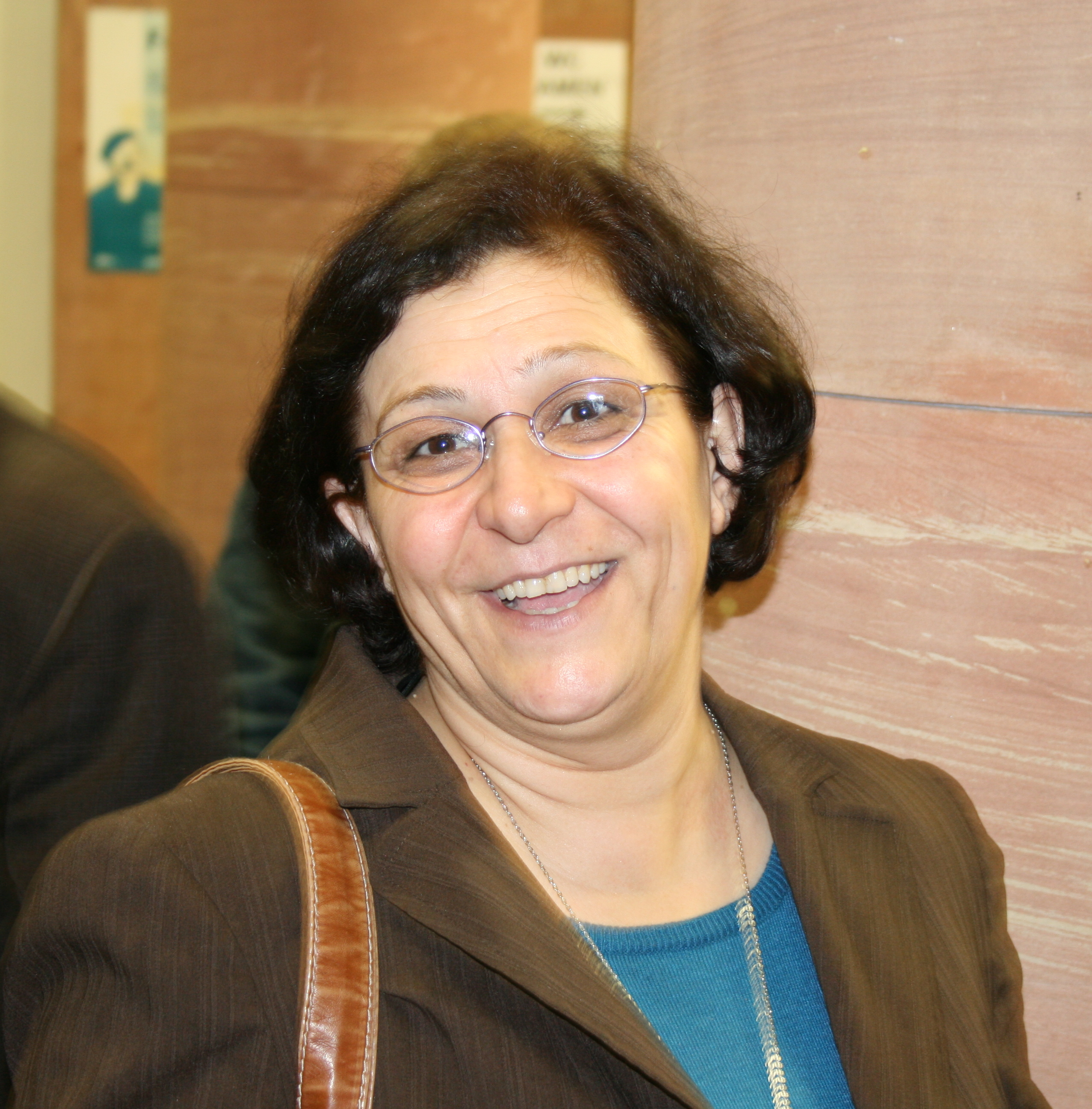
- Born: 25 May 1956 (age 70); Abhar, Imperial State of Iran
- Political party: Worker-communist Party of Iran
- Awards: Secularist of the Year

Mina Ahadi (Persian: مینا احدی, romanized: Minâ Ahadi, born 25 May 1956) is an Iranian-Austrian political activist. She is a member of the Central Committee and Politburo of the Worker-communist Party of Iran.

== Advocacy ==
Mina Ahadi campaigns for citizens' rights and for legal systems based upon secular values rather than upon religious doctrine. She is the leading figure of the International Committee Against Executions and the International Committee Against Stoning. She was also the most important founder of the German Central Council of Ex-Muslims. The aim of the Council is to make it possible for Muslims to renounce Islam without being punished under anti-apostasy legislation. Among Ahadi's achievements are the liberation of Nazanin Fatehi from an Iranian jail. Since October 2018, she has been the official ambassador for the registered association intaktiv e.V., which opposes the circumcision of male children.

== Life ==
Ahadi's husband, who also was a political activist, was put to death in Iran on the date of the couple's wedding anniversary. It was his execution that motivated her fight against capital punishment. Ahadi has two daughters.

Ahadi fled Iran in the early 1980s and now lives and works in Germany. Due to death threats, she has been living under police protection from the moment of her first public appearance as the chairwoman of the Central Council of Ex-Muslims.

On 20 October 2007, Ahadi was awarded the Secularist of the Year prize by the UK's National Secular Society.

== See also ==
- Walid Husayin
- Ehsan Jami
- Maryam Namazie
- Arzu Toker
