= Bettina-von-Arnim-Preis =

German literary award

Bettina-von-Arnim-Preis was a literary prize of Germany. It was named after German author Bettina von Arnim and was awarded between 1992 and 2003. First place prize winners received €12,500.
