= Central Council of Ex-Muslims =

German association for former Muslims

- Founded: 21 January 2007
- Purpose: Representing Muslim apostates
- Location: Köln, Germany
- Key people: Mina Ahadi, Arzu Toker, Nur Gabbari
- Website: exmuslim.de

The Central Council of Ex-Muslims (German: Zentralrat der Ex-Muslime und sonstiger nichtreligiöser Menschen e. V., ZdE) is a German association (Verein) advocating for the rights and interests of non-religious, secular persons of Muslim heritage who have left Islam. It was founded on 21 January 2007 and as of May 2007 had about 200 members, with "hundreds" of membership applications yet to be processed.

The term "Central Council of Ex-Muslims" typically refers to organizations or groups that advocate for the rights and support of individuals who have left or renounced Islam. These organizations often work to provide a platform for ex-Muslims to share their experiences, express their beliefs, and seek assistance if needed. They may also focus on promoting secularism, human rights, and freedom of belief.

The organisation opened branches in Britain and Scandinavia and the Central Committee for Ex-Muslims was created in the Netherlands. The British chapter is affiliated with The Ex-Muslim Forum. Another Ex-Muslim grassroots group, Ex-Muslims of North America, launched independently in Canada and the United States and affiliated itself with the Central Council of Ex-Muslims.

== Foundation ==
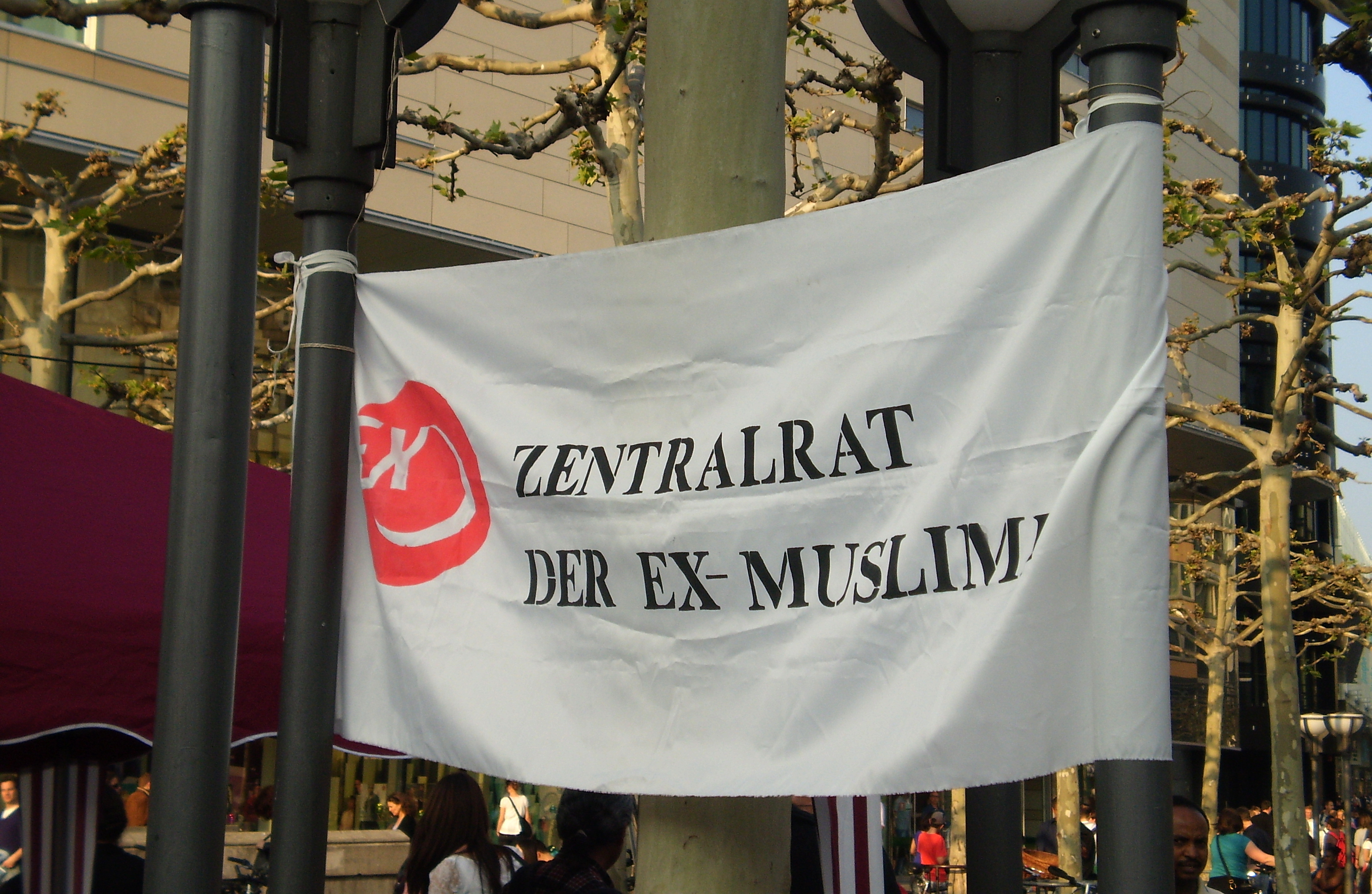
Banner of the Zentralrat der Ex-Muslime at a counterdemonstration in Frankfurt am Main, 2011.

The Council was founded by about 30 ex-Muslims including Iranian women's rights activist Mina Ahadi (chairman), who was sentenced to death in 1981 in her home country; the Turkish-born publicist Arzu Toker (vice chairman); and Nur Gabbari, the son of an Iraqi clergyman.

Even in lands where execution for apostasy is prohibited, former Muslims are not sure of their lives, as their Muslim relatives may try to kill them. Chairwoman Ahadi has been put under personal security by German police after receiving death threats. Ahadi says that she and other members have been "terrorized".

The choice of the association's name is furthermore deliberate, as it is an allusion to the name of the Central Council of Muslims in Germany, which represents approximately 20,000 of the over 3 million German Muslims, and whose name is an allusion to the Central Council of Jews in Germany.

The Central Council of Ex-Muslims receives support from the Giordano Bruno Foundation in Germany and according to its own claim also by the International League of non-religious and atheists, Bund für Geistesfreiheit München, as well as Humanistischer Pressedienst.

== Goals ==
On 28 February 2007, the Central Council of Ex-Muslims published details of the association's goals in a press conference at the Bundespressekonferenz in Berlin.

Comparable goals are aspired by the initiative "Secular Islam" of Islam critic Ibn Warraq, who belongs to the signers of the MANIFESTO: Together facing the new totalitarianism and has published a book called Leaving Islam. Apostates speak out.

The Council has stated its goals:

1. "Start the campaign We've Given It Up!, which may be an allusion to an earlier feminist campaign under the slogan We have aborted!. The goal of the campaign is to convey ideas of Enlightenment to Islam. The Council wants to highlight the difficulties of leaving the Islamic faith and help those who are interested in doing so to leave Islam."
2. "Convince the German government not to perceive all immigrants from Islamic countries as Muslims. The Council criticizes the fact that these immigrants are considered to be Muslims regardless of their actual beliefs. Mina Ahadi denounces the German Islam Conference which was initiated by the German government in the summer of 2006 for making this association."
3. "Convince the German government to stop dealing with political Muslim organizations such as the Central Council of Muslims in Germany (ZMD) or Milli Görüs. According to the Council, these organizations are inherently against human rights, anti-secular, and are anti-integrationist and should not be seen as an appropriate contact for the Muslim community by the German government."

== The Council's criticism of Islam ==
Arzu Toker stated in an interview that she considers Sharia, Islamic law, as unacceptable and contradicting to both human rights and the values of the German constitution. According to Toker, Islam is anti-woman as it humiliates women and turns them into servants of the men. It is also anti-man, because it reduces men to breeding animals controlled by their urges. She also said that she does not distinguish between Islam and fundamentalism since according to her, "Islam is inherently radical".

The Council is also critical of umbrella organizations in Germany, which they say represent only political Islam and not most of the Muslims in Germany, and accuses them of being responsible for the appalling conditions under which many Muslims in Germany live.

In different interviews Ahadi has stated that it was not possible to reform Islam, that she is critical of all religions and not only of Islam, but that she does not want to abolish religion. The Council would like to live in peaceful and tolerant coexistence with Muslims in Germany.

In 2008 and 2013, the Council and the Giordano Bruno Foundation co-hosted the Kritische Islamkonferenz. The first aimed to stimulate the growth of the newly established ex-Muslim movement in Europe, the second was mostly intended to forge alliances between ex-Muslims and progressive/reformist Muslims against Islamism and xenophobia in Germany.

== Council of Ex-Muslims of Britain ==
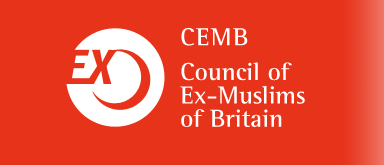
Logo of the CEMB.

The Council of Ex-Muslims of Britain is the British branch of the organization, representing former Muslims who fear for their lives because they have renounced Islam. It was launched in Westminster on 22 June 2007, and is led by Maryam Namazie, who was awarded Secularist of the Year in 2005 and has faced death threats. The activists of the organization, many of whom are Iranian exiles, support the freedom to criticize religion and the end to what they call "religious intimidation and threats." The CEMB in its manifesto states that it does not desire to be represented by regressive Islamic organizations and "Muslim community leaders". It says that by coming forward in public, it represents countless other apostates who fear coming out in public due to death threats. They take a "stand for reason, universal rights and values, and secularism". The Council in its manifesto also demands several things such as freedom to criticize religion, separation of religion from the state and the "protection of children from manipulation and abuse by religion and religious institutions".

== See also ==
- Apostasy in Islam
- Criticism of Islam
- List of ex-Muslim organisations
- List of former Muslims
- Liberal movements within Islam
