= Eric Hilgendorf =

German professor of law and legal philosopher

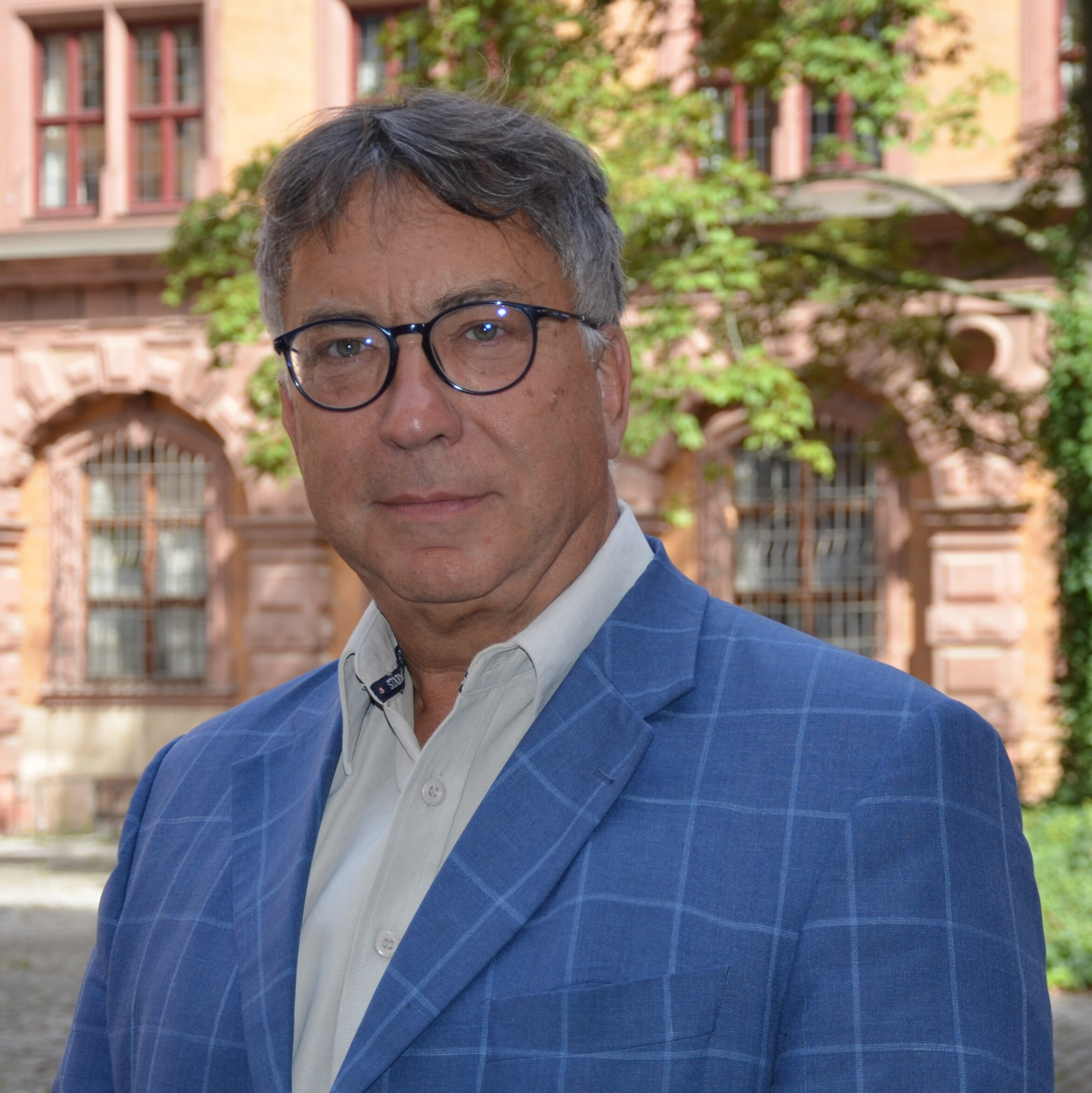
- Professor Dr. Dr. Eric Hilgendorf (Photo 2025)
- Born: 3 December 1960 (age 65); Stuttgart, West Germany
- Education: University of Tübingen
- Scientific career
- Fields: Criminal law, jurisprudence
- Workplaces: University of Constance; University of Würzburg

Eric Andreas Hilgendorf (German: [ˈhɪlɡn̩dɔʁf]; born 3 December 1960) is a German professor of law and legal philosopher. He holds the Chair in Criminal Law, Criminal Procedure, Legal Theory, and Information and Computer Science Law at the University of Würzburg. Hilgendorf is one of Germany's most influential scholars in the field of criminal law, with special focuses on IT law as well as on artificial intelligence and law.

== Academic background ==
After graduating from high school in Ansbach in 1980, Hilgendorf entered the University of Tübingen, where he studied a range of subjects including philosophy, modern history, religious studies, and law. He was awarded his BA/MA degree in philosophy and history upon submission of his master's thesis entitled the History of the Parliamentary Freedom of Speech in Germany. In 1990 he completed his PhD in Philosophy with submission of the study Argumentation in Jurisprudence, and was awarded his second PhD, in the field of Law, for his thesis entitled Criminal Production Liability in the Society of Risk. In 1997 he completed the dissertation for his habilitation On the Distinction of Factual Statements and Value Judgments in Criminal Law, which focused on criminal law, criminal procedure, and legal philosophy.

Following his habilitation, Hilgendorf was appointed and served as professor of criminal law at the University of Constance from 1997 to 2001, serving there as Dean from 1999 to 2001. Since 2001 he has taught at the Julius-Maximilian University of Würzburg, where he holds the Chair in Criminal Law, Criminal Justice, Legal Theory, Information and Computer Science Law. He served as Dean of the Würzburg Law Faculty from October 2010 to September 2012.

== Academic career ==
Hilgendorf's main areas of interest are German and European computer- and Internet criminal law, law and technology (with a special focus on AI), medicine and criminal law, and comparative law. He is also active in more general legal research including work in the subfields of legal philosophy, legal theory, bioethics, history of legal thought, the history of criminal law, and human dignity. He is regarded as a pioneer in the field of e-learning in law and from 2005 to 2009 was a member of the Commission on Virtual Higher Education in Bavaria.

Among his distinctions, Hilgendorf is a member of the Association of Criminal Law Teachers (professors) and the European Society for Analytic Philosophy, a correspondent of the Hans Kelsen Society in Vienna, and a member of the Scientific Advisory Committee of the Giordano Bruno Foundation. In addition, he is a member of the Deutsche Akademie für Technikwissenschaften (Acatech) (German Academy for Technological Sciences). Hilgendorf has been called upon several times to advise the German Parliament and federal government on matters of criminal law, medical law, and Internet crime. Since 2014, Hilgendorf has served as co-editor of the renowned JuristenZeitung.

Professor Hilgendorf has also been a spokesperson for Würzburg's Center for Foundational Legal Research. He founded the University of Würzburg’s project "Global Systems and Intercultural Competence" (GSIK), which focuses on teaching students of all faculties how to recognize, analyze, and resolve intercultural conflict. This program has included a number of sub-projects focusing on international comparative law. He was one of the organizers of an international team of researchers on "Medicine and Human Dignity" at the Center for Interdisciplinary Research (ZIF) in Bielefeld, Germany.

Hilgendorf is involved in the field of international legal development through his cooperation with universities in Turkey, the Caucasus (mainly Azerbaijan), Latin America, and East Asia (China, Korea and Japan), establishing a strong working relationship with Peking University Law School. In 2010, together with Professor Genlin Liang of the Peking University, he founded the Chinese-German Federation of Criminal Law Professors (CDSV), whose goal is to promote academic exchange between the two countries. Meanwhile, the CDSV has become one of the most important academic platforms for cooperation in criminal law between Germany and China.

In 2013, Hilgendorf was invited as visiting professor at the Law Faculty of the Peking University. Peking University has awarded him the title of honorary professor. Since 2018, he is member of the "Global Faculty" of Peking University Law School. In the same year. he received an honorary professorship from Renmin University Law School. In 2014, he was a guest professor at Hebrew University, Jerusalem. He is the editor of a Festschrift for former Israel Supreme Court Judge Yoram Danziger on occasion of his 70th birthday. In 2025, Hilgendorf founded the "Internationale Feuerbach-Gesellschaft" (International Feuerbach Society).

In 2010, Hilgendorf founded the Forschungsstelle Robotrecht, a well-known research centre addressing legal issues related to autonomous systems and AI in industrial processes, transport and private life. Autonomous driving raises questions of civil and criminal liability, protection of privacy and matters of registration for road use. From 2013 to 2017, he was head of the pan-European legal research group of AdaptIVe, an EU-funded research project on the development of autonomous vehicles. In 2016, he was appointed by Federal Minister of Transport and Digital Infrastructure Alexander Dobrindt to serve on the German government's Ethics Commission on Autonomous Driving. From 2019 to 2024, Hilgendorf has been co-director of the newly founded Bavarian Research Institute for Digital Transformation (BIDT) situated in Munich. Moreover, he was member of the European High Level Expert Group on Artificial Intelligence (EU HLEG on AI) which laid the foundations of the new European AI Act. In 2020, he was appointed as a member of the Bavarian AI Council.

Hilgendorf is also the chairperson of the Juristen ALUMNI Würzburg, the University of Würzburg Law Faculty's alumni relations program.

== Publications ==
Hilgendorf is the author of numerous books, essays, and annotations. Many of his works have been translated into other languages such as English, Spanish, Portuguese, Chinese, Japanese, Korean, Turkish, Persian and Greek. Among his works are (with English translation):

- Argumentation in der Jurisprudenz. Zur Rezeption von analytischer Philosophie und kritischer Theorie in der Grundlagenforschung der Jurisprudenz (Argumentation in Jurisprudence: On the Reception of Analytical Philosophy and Critical Theory in the Basic Research of Jurisprudence), Tübingen, Univ., Diss., 1990, Duncker & Humblot Berlin 1991
- Die Entwicklungsgeschichte der parlamentarischen Redefreiheit in Deutschland (Historical Development of the Parliamentary Freedom of Speech in Germany), Peter Lang Frankfurt am Main 1991
- Hans Albert zur Einführung (Hans Albert: an Introduction), Junius, Hamburg 1997 (Zur Einführung, 143)
- Wissenschaftlicher Humanismus. Texte zur Moral- und Rechtsphilosophie des frühen logischen Empirismus (Scientific Humanism: Essays on the Moral- and Legal Philosophy of early Logical Empiricism), Haufe Verlag, Freiburg 1998 (Haufe-Schriftenreihe zur rechtswissenschaftlichen Grundlagenforschung, Bd. 12)
- Fallsammlung zum Strafrecht. (Casebook on Criminal Law: General and Special Parts), 3 Vols., 2020 ff.
- dtv - Atlas Recht Bd. 1. Grundlagen, Staatsrecht, Strafrecht (dtv - Atlas of Law Vol. 1. Foundations of Constitutional and Criminal Law), Deutscher Taschenbuchverlag, Munich 2003, 2. Ed. 2008
- dtv - Atlas Recht Bd. 2 Verwaltungsrecht, Zivilrecht (dtv – Atlas of Law Vol. 2 Administrative Law, Civil Law), Deutscher Taschenbuchverlag, Munich 2008
- Strafrecht Besonderer Teil (Criminal Law Special Part), Gieseking Verlag, 4. Ed. Bielefeld 2021 (together with author Bernd Heinrich)
- Die deutschsprachige Strafrechtswissenschaft in Selbstdarstellungen (German Criminal Legal Science as it Sees Itself), Vol. 1, 2010, Vol 2, 2018 (Editor)
- Book series on Ostasiatisches Strafrecht (East Asian Criminal Law), Tübingen 2010 ff. (Editor)
- Handbuch des deutschen Strafrechts (Handbook of German Criminal Law), Vols. 1 -9, Heidelberg 2018 - 2023 (editor, together with co-editors Hans Kudlich and Brian Valerius)
- Medizinstrafrecht (Medical Criminal Law), 2. Ed. 2019
- Lehr- und Praxiskommentar Strafrecht (Commentary on Criminal Law for Teachers and Practitioners of Law), 10. Ed. 2025
- KI-VO (Act of AI of Europe), Nomos, Baden-Baden 2025
