= Arzu Toker =

German-speaking writer, journalist, publicist and translator (born 1952)

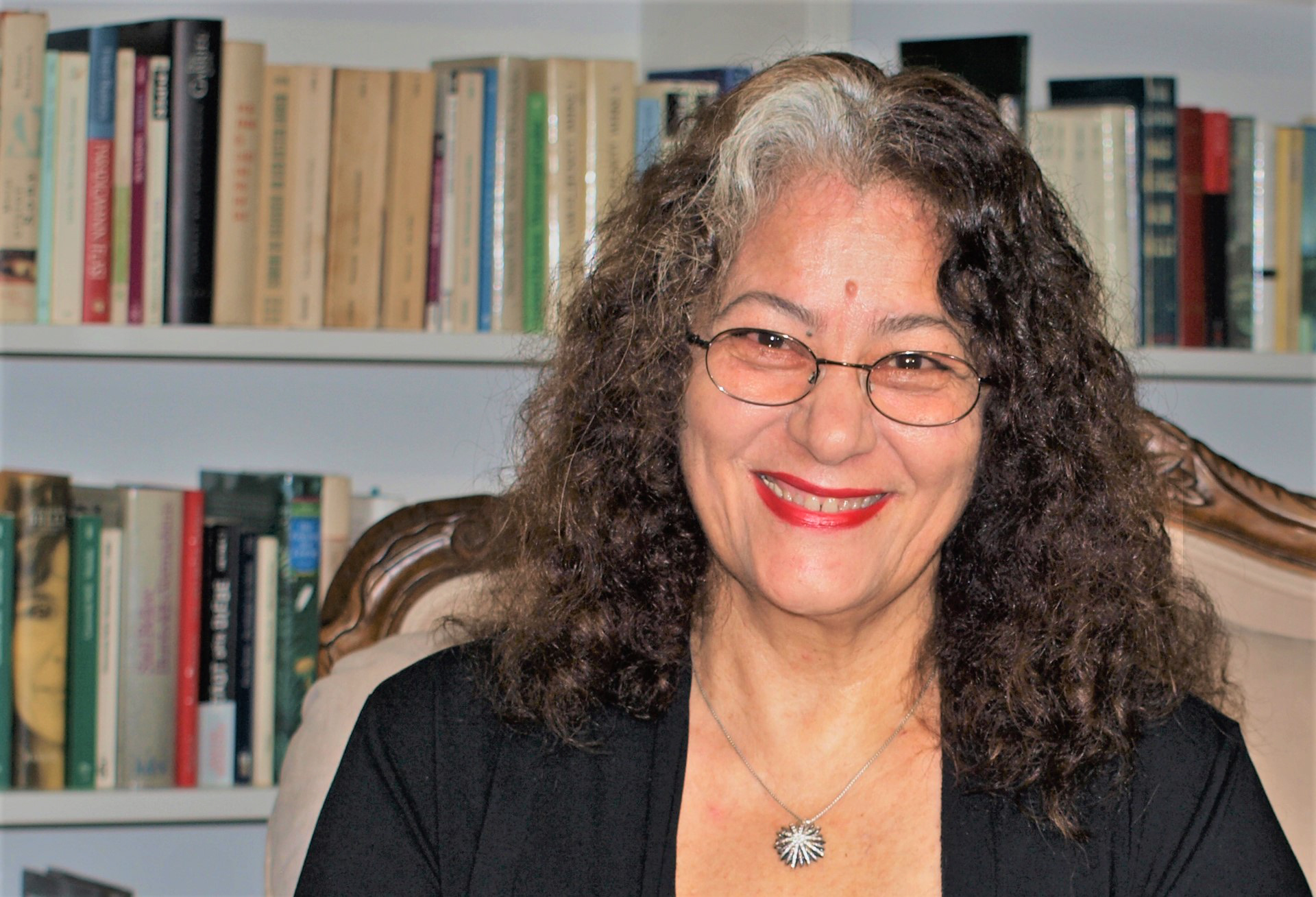
Arzu Toker in 2020

Arzu Toker (born 1952) is a German-speaking writer, journalist, publicist and translator of Turkish descent.

== Biography ==
Toker was born in 1952 in Halfeti, Turkey. She emigrated to Germany in 1974, where she has lived ever since. She dedicates her life to enlightenment and to the development of individual freedom and personality. Today the focus of her work is on literary.

Arzu Toker studied social pedagogy and worked in a youth welfare office. She is committed to women´s and children´s rights and international solidarity and founded various initiatives (women´s initiatives, free nursery schools). She started and directed theatre projects with young people (among others in adolescent psychiatry). She was a founding member of the media foundation CIVIS and board member of the Foundation Heinrich Böll. For 12 years she was a member of the broadcasting council of WDR, 9 years of which as deputy chair of the program committee. Early 2007, she and Mina Ahadi were amongst the founders of the Central Council of Ex-Muslims, a German association that aims to represent people who have renounced Islam.

Since her youth Arzu Toker is writing: poems, essays, short stories, plays, a novel, as well as journalistic texts for print and radio. She has written, translated and edited critical articles and books and gives talks about Islam. She is considered an expert on issues of Islamic and Western societies.

== Awards ==
Together with Niki Eideneier, in 1998 Arzu Toker received the Turkish-Greek Abdi-İpekçi-Award for Peace and International understanding.

== Fiction ==
Selection

- Kalimerhaba: griechisch-deutsch-türkisches Lesebuch (publ. with Niki Eideneier); Köln 1992, ISBN 9783923728534
- „Samt und Seide“ (Velvet and silk), in: Niki Eideneier (Ed.): ... die Visionen deiner Liebeslust – Liebe und Erotik in der Fremde, Romiosini – Verlag, Köln, 1995
- „Frauen sind eure Äcker“, by Ilhan Arsel und Arzu Toker, Alibri (Mai 2012)
- „Kein Schritt zurück“, Alibri, Aschaffenburg 2014

== Journalistic ==
Selection

- Ilhan Arsel – Juden und Christen im Koran (publ. and translation), Norderstedt 2006
- „Tschardak“ in: Kölner Symphonie, Autoren in Athen, Romiosini Verlag, Athen, 1993
- „Zwischen staatlicher und alltäglicher Diskriminierung“, in: Türken Raus?, Rolf Meinhardt (Ed.) Rowohlt, 1984
- „Liebe Freundinnen des Kopftuchs“, Emma July/August 93
- „Der ethnozentrische Blick“ In: Beate Winkler (Hrsg.): Was heißt denn hier fremd?. Humboldt Verlag, 1994
- „Italienische Sexbomben, türkische Kopftuchfrauen und andere Exotinnen: Migrantinnen im deutschen Fernsehen“ in: Verwaschen und verschwommen, Bärbel Röben/C.Wilß (Ed.) Brandes u. Apsel Verlag, 1996
- More articles in: Ost/West Wochenzeitung, der Freitag and TAZ („Hundert Jahre Schweigen“ „Die Morde von Sivas“ „Wir haben keine Nation“ „Mohammeds Rache“)
- „Zehn Gründe, aus dem Islam auszutreten“ (2007)

== Radio and television ==
Selection

- Politische Morde in der Türkei, am Beispiel von Ugur Mumcu, Journalist. Research for ARTE, Themed evening and Moderation of the feature
- Deutschland aber wusste nichts von seinem Glück. Feature, Westdeutscher Rundfunk (SWR), Editing: Nadja Odeh, broadcast 2 December 2004, 10.05 h, 23’56’

== Recitations ==
Selection

- „Der Prophet und die Frau im Koran“, Ev. Kirche/AWO Lippstadt, 2004
- „Die Zukunft in meinen Händen“, Remember for the Future, conference in Berlin, 1991
- „Erzähl mir, wie dein Land Einwanderer behandelt und ich sage Dir, welches Land es ist“, Meeting by Wir Forum in coordination with Landesinstitut für Schule u. Weiterbildung, Soest, 1992
- „Fremde Heimat- Heimat in der Fremde“, Volkshochschule Leverkusen, 1994
- „Vergangenheits-Bewältigung‘ in der deutschen Sprache“, International Society for the Comparative Study of Civilizations, event organized by the University of Minnesota, USA in Dublin, 1994
- „Reinland oder raus?“, discussion in Mayersche Buchhandlung, 1995
- „Die Zukunft gehört der Migration!“, Angelockt vom Geruch der Freiheit, Sunday matinee in the townhall of Delmenhorst, 1995
- „Entführung in den Serail. Weiblicher Alltag im Islam zwischen Legende u. Wirklichkeit“, Talkshow with music, film literature imbedded in the exposition „Im Lichte des Halbmonds“, Kunst u. Ausstellungshalle der Bundesrepublik Deutschland, 1996
- „Tropisches Deutschland“, public library Stuttgart, 1996
- „Minderheiten in den Medien“, Kreuzberg Museum, 1997
- „Nationalismus und die Migration“, 1998, Basel
- „Fürchte Dich vor dem der ein einziges Buch liest“, FDP Berlin, subject Europe and Islam, 1999
- „Die Identität der Deutschen und Einwanderer im Spiegelbild der Migration“, Berkeley University, San Francisco, 1999
- „Minderheiten in Deutschland, Recht und Identität“, Stanford University, 1999
- „Migration als Befreiung“, Gustav Stresemann Institut, 1999
