= Central Committee for Ex-Muslims =

Dutch committee that aided Muslims who wish to leave Islam

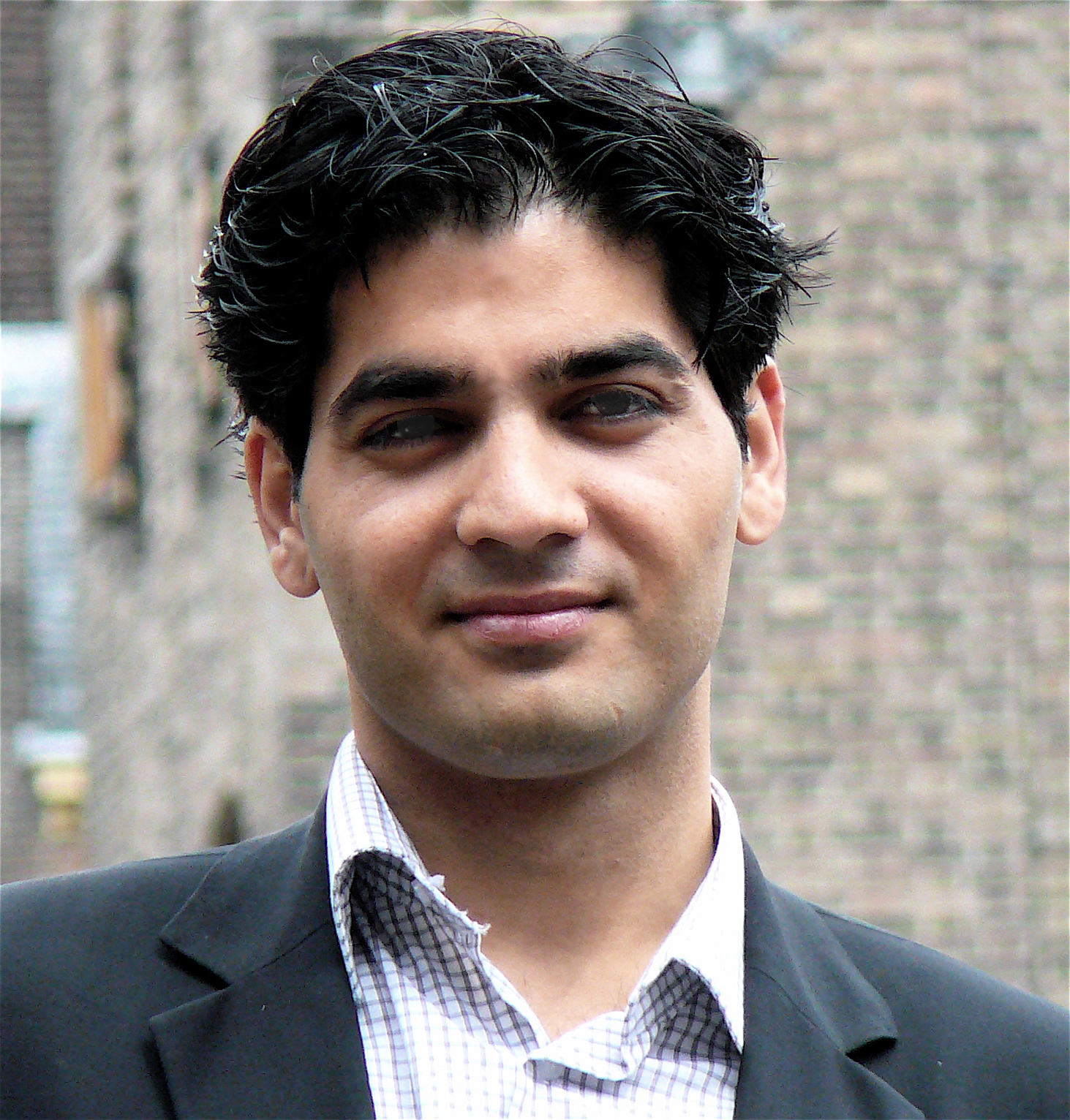
Ehsan Jami (Mashhad, April 20, 1985) is a Dutch politician and publicist. He is founder of the Central Committee for Ex-Muslims and from 7 March 2006 to 6 November 2007 on behalf of the Labour Party member of the city council of Leidschendam-Voorburg.

The Central Committee for Ex-Muslims (Dutch: Centraal Comité voor Ex-moslims) was a Dutch committee that aimed to aid Muslims who wish to leave Islam through the constitutional right of freedom of religion. In addition, the committee fought to break the taboo on apostasy in the Muslim world as well as start a debate on women's rights in Islamic societies.

The committee urged the Dutch government to offer help to ex-Muslims in exile. Ehsan Jami (Labour Party) and Loubna Berrada (People's Party for Freedom and Democracy), founded the committee in 2007, with the help of several advisors and other former Muslims and critics of Islam.

The committee officially started its activities in September 2007 after announcing its foundation to the Dutch public in a broadcast on NPO Radio 1 on 2 May 2007. During the broadcast, Jami announced a wish to offer a helping hand to Muslims who want to abandon their religion since Islamic society does not allow apostasy.

Jami pointed out abandoning Islam is an option in most Muslim societies, as long as it is not spoken out and one continues to act as though one is still a believer. Open apostasy in Islamic societies, Jami explained, leads to expulsion and death threats - a manner of conduct he strongly opposes. Later that week, Jami appeared on Dutch television show Schepper & Co defending his remarks by pointing out he, as a politician, has the duty to verbalise worries that exist in society, thereby making full use of Dutch society's freedom of speech.

"Sharia schools say that they will kill the ones who leave Islam", Jami said. Gaining support from the Dutch government to permit freedom of conscience is a fundamental aspect of the committee's action plan.

Co-founder Berrada quit the committee in June 2007 because she felt Jami acted in an "unwise" manner by criticising the religion of Islam itself, stating: "I don't think it's convenient to question Islam itself. Unwise. I don't want to get involved in that. Keep [the message] thus: you should be able to quit Islam without being threatened. That's it." In an August 2007 interview, she said that "[i]f you [criticise the Quran and the prophet], you will offend lots of people. That will not help in furthering the debate. We are simply not yet at that stage, this must be done step by step."

In 2008 Ehsan Jami announced that the committee would be dismantled, because – according to him – supporters had been threatened and therefore feared the consequences of becoming a member.

== See also ==
- Central Council of Ex-Muslims (Germany)
- Council of Ex-Muslims of Britain
- Criticism of Islam
- Ehsan Jami
- Fitna
- List of ex-Muslim organisations
