= Ehsan Jami =

Iranian-Dutch politician, right-wing activist and author

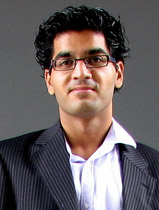
- Born: 20 April 1985 (age 41); Mashhad, Iran
- Occupations: Politician, activist
- Known for: Central Committee for Ex-Muslims
- Political party: PVV (2009–present); Livable Rotterdam (2018–present)
- Other political affiliations: Dutch Labour Party (2006–2007)
- Ehsan Jami's voice Recorded June 2015
- Website: www.ehsanjami.nl (unofficial)

Ehsan Jami (born 20 April 1985) is an Iranian-born Dutch politician, activist and author who co-founded the former Central Committee for Ex-Muslims. He was previously a member of the Partij van de Arbeid (PvdA) before becoming active in the PVV founded by Geert Wilders.

== Early life ==
Jami was born and raised on 20 April 1985, in Mashhad, Iran. His father is a doctor. His mother converted, later in her life, to Christianity. As son of a doctor, Jami enjoyed substantial privileges in Iran. In an interview, Jami stated: "My grandparents were Muslim, but my father was non-religious." Yet in a different interview made two years earlier, he had described his father as Muslim. Political engagement by Jami's father forced the family to leave the country. Together with his parents and his older sister, the then nine-year-old Jami arrived in the Netherlands in 1994, later obtaining Dutch nationality.

== Career ==
Jami studied Management Science for one and a half year in the Netherlands and joined the Partij van de Arbeid as member in 2003. He was elected to the city council of Leidschendam-Voorburg in the local elections of March 2006.

After the September 11 attacks in 2001, Jami started reading the Qur'an and Hadith, after which he decided he didn't identify with either. Jami criticized Islamic prophet Muhammad, describing him as a "criminal". Together with Loubna Berrada (founder of the Advisory Committee for Integration, part of the right-wing Liberal party), Jami founded the Central Committee for Ex-Muslims in 2007. The organisation, supported by Afshin Ellian, aims to support apostates of Islam. Berrada left the committee shortly after it was founded because she felt Jami challenged Islam itself too much, saying: "I don't wish to confront Islam itself. I only want to spread the message that Muslims should be allowed to leave Islam behind without being threatened".

From 7 March 2006 until 6 November 2007, he was member of the city council of Leidschendam-Voorburg on behalf of the Dutch Labour Party (PvdA). From that date until 2010 he continued to be a member of the city council as independent member 'fraction Jami'

On 4 August 2007, Jami was attacked in his hometown Voorburg by three men. The attack is widely believed to be linked to his activities for the committee. The national anti-terrorism coordinator's office, the public prosecution department and the police decided during a meeting on 6 August that "additional measures" were necessary for the protection of Jami who has subsequently received extra security.

In September 2007, he penned an op-ed together with PVV politician Geert Wilders for the Dutch daily Volkskrant, likening the threat of Islam to the rise of Adolf Hitler's National Socialism in the 1930s. It was a response to National Antiterrorism Coordinator Tjibbe Joustra's remarks in Algemeen Dagblad, who criticized the tone used by some people in the discussion about Islam.

On 4 October 2007, Jami announced that he was working on a film project due to be released in February 2008 which he felt could be comparable in terms of controversy to the Jyllands-Posten Muhammad cartoons controversy. On 31 March 2008 he cancelled this project after being urged to do so by Dutch Minister of Justice Ernst Hirsch Ballin and threats from Iran.

However, after months of deliberation, Jami again decided to release the film. The short film was released on 9 December 2008. The announcement was followed by calls from European Islamic organizations for boycott of Dutch products. Dutch Premier Jan Peter Balkenende issued an apology for Jami's film.

After expressing strong opinions against Islam, strong criticism of the PvdA, and comparing the Islamic Prophet Muhammad with Adolf Hitler, he was asked to give up his council membership as part of the PvdA. By refusing to resign and continuing as an independent member, he lost his membership of PvdA.

Jami was allegedly mentioned in the writings of Anders Behring Breivik.

Jami has been on the Advisory Board of the International Free Press Society, a key component of the international counter-jihad network.

In 2009, Geert Wilders announced that Jami had become part of the Party for Freedom. During the 2018 Dutch municipal elections, Jami was elected to Rotterdam council as a member of the Livable Rotterdam party.

== See also ==
- List of former Muslims
