= Karen Duve =

German author (born 1961)

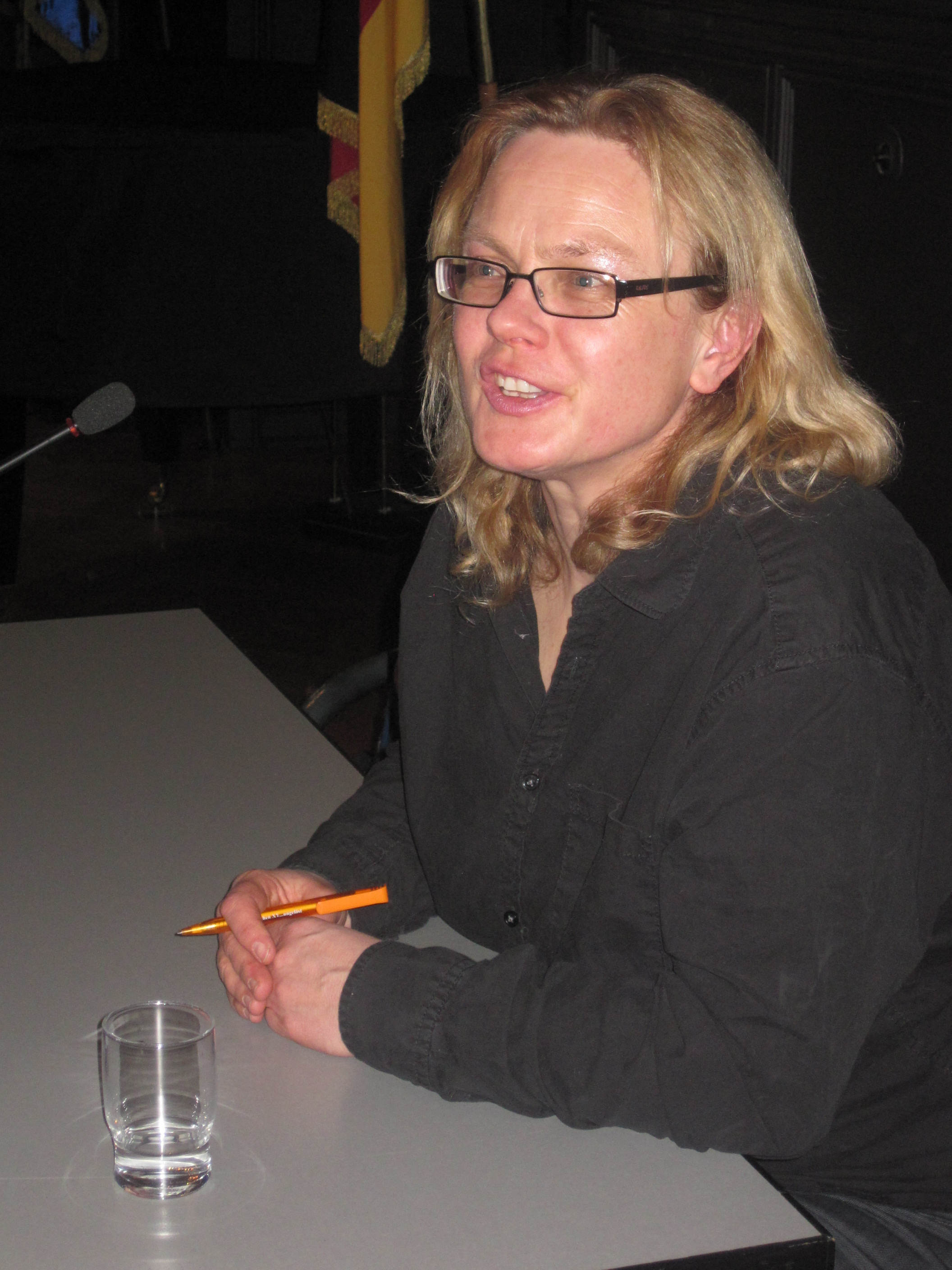
Duve in 2013

Karen Duve (born 16 November 1961 in Hamburg) is a German author. After secondary school, she worked as a proof-reader and taxi driver in Hamburg. Since 1990 she has been a freelance writer.

== Bibliography ==
- Im tiefen Schnee ein stilles Heim, short stories, Achilla Presse 1995, ISBN 3-928398-27-X
- Bruno Orso fliegt ins Weltall, (with Judith Zaugg), comic, Maro Verlag 1997, ISBN 3-87512-658-0
- Lexikon berühmter Tiere, (with Thies Völker), Eichborn 1997, ISBN 3-8218-0505-6
- Keine Ahnung: Erzählungen, Suhrkamp 1999, ISBN 3-518-39535-1
- Lexikon berühmter Pflanzen, (with Thies Völker), List TB 1999, ISBN 3-548-60198-7
- Regenroman, Ullstein 1999, ISBN 3-548-60028-X (English translation entitled Rain)
- Weihnachten mit Thomas Müller, Eichborn 2003, ISBN 3-8218-0747-4
- Dies ist kein Liebeslied, 2004, ISBN 3-442-45603-7 (English translation entitled This Is Not a Love Song)
- Weihnachten mit Thomas Müller. Illustrations by Petra Kolitsch, Eichborn Verlag, Frankfurt am Main 2003, ISBN 3-8218-0747-4
- Die entführte Prinzessin. Von Drachen, Liebe und anderen Ungeheuern. Novel. Eichborn Verlag, Frankfurt am Main 2005 (paperback 2007, ISBN 978-3-442-46142-4)
- Thomas Müller und der Zirkusbär. Illustrations by Petra Kolitsch. Eichborn Verlag, Frankfurt am Main 2006, ISBN 3-8218-0778-4
- Taxi. Roman. Eichborn Verlag, Frankfurt am Main 2008, ISBN 978-3-8218-0953-3
- Anständig essen. Ein Selbstversuch. Galiani Verlag, Berlin 2011, ISBN 978-3-86971-028-0 (English translation entitled Eating Decently)
- Grrrimm. Galiani Verlag, Berlin 2012, ISBN 978-3-86971-064-8
- Warum die Sache schiefgeht: Wie Egoisten, Hohlköpfe und Psychopathen uns um die Zukunft bringen (Essay), Galiani Verlag, Berlin 2014, ISBN 978-3-86971-100-3
- Macht. Novel. Galiani Verlag, Berlin 2016, ISBN 978-3-86971-008-2.
- The Prepper Room. Novel. Dedalus Books 2018, translation: Mike Mitchell, ISBN 978-1-910213-72-8
- Fräulein Nettes kurzer Sommer. Roman. Galiani, Berlin 2018, ISBN 978-3-86971-138-6.

== Awards ==
- 1991: Preis für junge Prosa der Stadt Arnsberg
- 1994: Open Mike-Literaturpreis der literaturWERKstatt Pankow
- 1995: Bettina-von-Arnim-Preis
- 1996: Gratwanderpreis
- 2001: Literatur-Förderpreis Hamburg
- 2004: Friedrich-Hebbel-Preis
- 2008: Hubert-Fichte-Preis der Stadt Hamburg
- 2011: Nominierung für den Preis der Leipziger Buchmesse mit Anständig essen
- 2017: Kasseler Literaturpreis für grotesken Humor

== Literatur ==
- Lyn Marven, Stuart Taberner: Emerging German-Language Novelists of the Twenty-First Century Camden House, 2011
- The novel in German since 1990 Cambridge Univ. Press, 2011
