= Cannon Movie Tales =

Series of 1980s films

- Produced by: Menahem Golan; Yoram Globus
- Production company: The Cannon Group
- Distributed by: The Cannon Group
- Countries: United States; Israel
- Language: English
- Budget: US$1.5 million (per film)

Cannon Movie Tales is the collective name for a series of live-action films created in the late 1980s by Cannon Group producers Menahem Golan and Yoram Globus, associate producer Patricia Ruben, and executive producer Itzik Kol. Filmed principally on location in Israel, these stories are generally fairy tales based on material by either the Brothers Grimm or Charles Perrault, among others. Major stars, from both the United States and the United Kingdom, play the leading roles, in which they are joined by a mostly all-Israeli cast. The major Israeli-born member of the crew was the series' production designer, Marek Dobrowolski. Announced as early as May 1986 (at the Cannes Film Festival), Cannon initiated the project as its answer to Disney's fairy-tale offerings, and invested US$50 million in the series. Sixteen stories (originally planned to be twelve stories), each costing US$1.5 million, were originally planned; only nine were released.

== Titles ==
1. The Frog Prince (1986) a.k.a. "Cannon Movie Tales: The Frog Prince"; writer-director: Jackson Hunsicker. Aileen Quinn, Helen Hunt, Clive Revill, John Paragon.
2. Sleeping Beauty (1987) a.k.a. "Cannon Movie Tales: Sleeping Beauty" – USA (series title); writer; Michael Berz; director: David Irving. Tahnee Welch, Kenny Baker, Morgan Fairchild, Sylvia Miles, David Holliday, Nicholas Clay.
3. The Emperor's New Clothes (1987) a.k.a. "Cannon Movie Tales: The Emperor's New Clothes" – USA (video title); writers: David Irving, Len Talan and Anna Matthias; director: David Irving. Sid Caesar, Clive Revill, Robert Morse, Lysette Anthony.
4. Rumpelstiltskin (1987) a.k.a. "Cannon Movie Tales: Rumpelstiltskin" – USA (series title); writer-director: David Irving. Amy Irving, Billy Barty, Clive Revill, Priscilla Pointer, John Moulder-Brown.
5. Snow White (1987) a.k.a. "Cannon Movie Tales: Snow White" – USA (series title), "Snow White: A Cannon Movie Tale" – USA (closing credits title); writer-director: Michael Berz. Diana Rigg, Billy Barty, Mike Edmonds, Malcolm Dixon, Sarah Patterson, Nicola Stapleton.
6. Beauty and the Beast (1987) a.k.a. "Cannon Movie Tales: Beauty and the Beast" – USA (series title); writer: Carole Lucia Satrina; director: Eugene Marner. John Savage, Rebecca De Mornay.
7. Hansel and Gretel (1987) a.k.a. "Cannon Movie Tales: Hansel and Gretel" – USA (series title); writers: Len Talan and Nancy Weems; director: Len Talan. David Warner, Cloris Leachman, Hugh Pollard, Nicola Stapleton.
8. Red Riding Hood (1987) a.k.a. "Cannon Movie Tales: Red Riding Hood"; writer: Carole Lucia Satrina; director: Adam Brooks. Isabella Rossellini, Craig T. Nelson, Amelia Shankley.
9. Puss in Boots (1988) a.k.a. "Cannon Movie Tales: Puss in Boots" – USA (series title); writer: Carole Lucia Satrina; director: Eugene Marner. Christopher Walken, Jason Connery, Carmela Marner, Yossi Graber.

== Home video ==
Of the nine films, only eight have been released on DVD by MGM in the United States. The Frog Prince has only been officially released on VHS. Although there is no "Complete Collection" DVD box set, the eight individual DVD releases have been collected (as five dual-sided discs) in the "MGM Movie Collection: 10 Kids Movies" DVD set (one of several sets with this generic title), which also includes the unrelated fantasy films Jack the Giant Killer (1962) and The Magic Sword (1962).

== See also ==
- Faerie Tale Theatre
