= Tom Rosqui =

American actor

- Born: Thomas Francis Rosqui; June 12, 1928; Oakland, California, U.S.
- Died: April 12, 1991 (aged 62); Los Angeles, California, U.S.
- Occupation: Actor
- Years active: 1951–1991
- Spouse: Erica Yohn (August 18, 1963 – April 12, 1991; his death)
- Children: 1 (+2 stepchildren)

Thomas Francis Rosqui (June 12, 1928 – April 12, 1991) was an American character actor known for his versatility at portraying a variety of stage and film roles.

== Early life ==
Born in Oakland, California, the son of a Portuguese mother, Sally (née Fernandes), a homemaker, and an Italian father, Thomas A. Rosqui, a traffic manager, Rosqui grew up in Sacramento and attended Sacramento Junior College and won a drama scholarship to the College of the Pacific, appearing in college productions and winning the school's F. Melvyn Lawson Award in dramatics.

== Career ==
Rosqui's career as a professional actor began in 1951, when he appeared in St. John Terrell's Music Circus in Sacramento, appearing in a production of Show Boat.

He went on to appear in the national touring company production of The Cocktail Party. While serving in the U.S. Navy he appeared in the Actor's Workshop in San Francisco. After discharge he moved to New York, returning to San Francisco to appear in Gift of Fury, a play by Herbert Blau, who had headed the San Francisco Actors' Workshop with Jules Irving. When Blau and Irving formed the Lincoln Center Repertory Company, he was invited to join it, performing there for two years, appearing in The Condemned of Altona and Danton's Death.

He appeared on Broadway in Sticks and Bones and The Price, among other productions. He also appeared on television, but his most prominent role was as Corleone family bodyguard Rocco Lampone in the first two Godfather movies. By the 1980s, he was appearing largely on stage.

== Personal life ==
Rosqui was married to actress Erica Yohn until his death at age 62 in 1991 due to cancer. He was survived by a son and two stepchildren.

== Filmography ==
| Year | Title | Role | Notes |
|---|---|---|---|
| 1962 | Days of Wine and Roses | Bettor | Uncredited |
| 1966 | The Crazy-Quilt | Henry | |
| 1968 | Madigan | Man | |
| 1968 | What's So Bad About Feeling Good? | Radio Cop | Uncredited |
| 1968 | The Thomas Crown Affair | Private Detective | |
| 1971 | The Pursuit of Happiness | District Attorney Keller | |
| 1972 | The Godfather | Rocco Lampone | Uncredited |
| 1974 | The Godfather Part II | Rocco Lampone | |
| 1976 | The Great Texas Dynamite Chase | Jason Morgan | |
| 1976 | Raid on Entebbe | Amos Eran | TV movie |
| 1977 | Airport '77 | Hunter | |
| 1977 | MacArthur | General Sampson | |
| 1977 | Heroes | Patrolman #2 | |
| 1978 | Shame, Shame on the Bixby Boys | Doc | |
| 1978 | Lady of the House | Sergeant John Guffy | TV movie |
| 1979 | California Dreaming | George Booke | |
| 1979 | Little House on the Prairie | Matthew Dobbs | episode: "The Faith Healer" |
| 1980 | The Night the City Screamed | Tom Burnham | TV movie |
| 1988 | Defense Play | Chief Gill | |
| 1991 | Guilty by Suspicion | Norman | (final film role) |
