= Bossa Nova (film) =

2000 Brazilian film directed by Bruno Barreto

- Spanish language theatrical release poster
- Directed by: Bruno Barreto
- Written by: Alexandre Machado; Fernanda Young
- Based on: Miss Simpson by Sérgio Sant'Anna
- Produced by: Lucy and Luiz Carlos Barreto
- Starring: Amy Irving; Antônio Fagundes
- Cinematography: Pascal Rabaud
- Edited by: Ray Hubley
- Music by: Eumir Deodato; Richard Martinez; Antonio Carlos Jobim
- Production companies: Filmes do Equador; L.C. Barreto
- Distributed by: Columbia TriStar Film Distributors International
- Release date: March 31, 2000
- Running time: 95 minutes
- Country: Brazil
- Languages: Portuguese; English
- Box office: R$3,165,333

Bossa Nova is a 2000 Brazilian-American romantic comedy film directed by Bruno Barreto. It deals with several interwoven stories about people finding and losing love in Rio de Janeiro. It stars Amy Irving (Barreto's wife and star of his earlier films A Show of Force, Carried Away, and One Tough Cop) as an English language teacher named Mary Ann.

== Synopsis ==
Miss Simpson, an American living in Rio de Janeiro, teaches English. Among her students are Acácio, a soccer player preparing to move to England, and Nadine, a tech enthusiast excited about an online romance with a supposed New York artist. During a chance encounter, Miss Simpson meets Pedro Paulo, a lawyer recently separated from his wife, who left him for her Chinese tai chi chuan instructor. Captivated by Miss Simpson's charm, Pedro Paulo decides to enroll in one of her classes.

== Cast ==
- Amy Irving as Mary Ann Simpson
- Antônio Fagundes as Pedro Paulo
- Alexandre Borges as Acácio
- Débora Bloch as Tânia
- Drica Moraes as Nadine
- Giovanna Antonelli as Sharon
- Rogério Cardoso as Vermont
- Pedro Cardoso as Roberto
- Stephen Tobolowsky as Trevor
