= Kiss Me Goodbye (film) =

1982 film by Robert Mulligan

- Theatrical release poster
- Directed by: Robert Mulligan
- Written by: Charlie Peters
- Based on: Dona Flor and Her Two Husbands by Bruno Barreto; Eduardo Coutinho; Leopoldo Serran (uncredited)
- Produced by: Robert Mulligan; Burt Sugarman
- Starring: Sally Field; James Caan; Jeff Bridges; Paul Dooley; Claire Trevor
- Cinematography: Donald Peterman
- Edited by: Sheldon Kahn
- Music by: Ralph Burns
- Color process: DeLuxe Color
- Distributed by: 20th Century Fox
- Release date: December 22, 1982
- Running time: 101 minutes
- Country: United States
- Language: English
- Budget: $8 million
- Box office: $15.8 million (United States/Canada)

Kiss Me Goodbye is a 1982 American romantic comedy film directed by Robert Mulligan, and starring Sally Field, James Caan, Jeff Bridges and Claire Trevor (in her final film role).

It is a remake of Dona Flor and Her Two Husbands (Dona Flor e Seus Dois Maridos in Portuguese), a 1976 Brazilian film, based on Jorge Amado's book of the same name.

Field was nominated for a Golden Globe Award for Best Actress in a Motion Picture – Comedy/Musical for her performance, but Caan later said he disliked the film, as he did several ones in which he appeared either just to keep working or for the money. In a 1991 interview, Caan claimed that making Kiss Me Goodbye was one of the most unpleasant experiences of his life, and that as a consequence, he did not make another film for five years.

== Plot ==
Kay is the widow of a Broadway showman called Jolly, who died falling from a staircase at their home. Kay plans to remarry, to an Egyptologist named Rupert, and suggests that they live in the same house. Jolly returns to her life as a ghost. Seen only by her, Jolly meddles in Kay's affairs and causes her mother and others to question her state of mind.

On a romantic weekend in the country together, Kay and Rupert are accompanied by Jolly, who is annoyed by Rupert's pretending to be able to see and hear him. The situation comes to a head back at the house, where a colleague of Rupert's attempts to stage an exorcism.

Jolly, finally convinced that Kay will be okay without him, kisses her goodbye for good. The film ends with Kay and Rupert getting married at the wedding rehearsal.

== Cast ==
- Sally Field as Kay Villano
- James Caan as Jolly Villano
- Jeff Bridges as Rupert Baines
- Claire Trevor as Charlotte
- Paul Dooley as Kendall
- Stephen Elliott as Edgar
- Michael Ensign as Billy
- Mildred Natwick as Mrs. Reilly
- William Prince as Rev. Hollis
- Dorothy Fielding as Emily
- Maryedith Burrell as Mrs. Newman
- Alan Haufrect as Mr. Newman

== Theme ==
The film's theme song, "But It's a Nice Dream", was written by Peter Allen and sung by Dusty Springfield.

== Reception ==
Vincent Canby of The New York Times wrote that: "Robert Mulligan's Kiss Me Goodbye is like a Nassau cruise ship with eight bars, seven discos, five swimming pools and no compass. It sails out of New York, turns left instead of right at the Ambrose Lightship and heads confidently toward sunny Iceland. ...Mr. Mulligan's direction perfectly matches Charlie Peters's screenplay in that both are humorless. The leads aren't great either. Miss Fields is neither Sonia Braga nor Irene Dunne and Mr. Caan, who appears to be imitating Gene Kelly, can't. Mr. Bridges behaves as if he were a family's faithful old dog, the sort of slobbering animal that will sell his soul for a pat on the head." Filmink called it " an amiable redo of Blithe Spirit/Topper... but sinks under a script which doesn’t give Caan enough to do. It is fun to see Caan as a Bob Fosse style hoofer-director."

The film opened Wednesday, December 22, 1982, on 783 theaters and grossed $1,846,222 in its first 5 days, finishing ninth for the weekend at the U.S. box office. In its second weekend, its weekend gross more than doubled, one of the best second-weekend increases since 1982. It went on to gross $15.8 million in the United States and Canada.

In a 1991 interview, James Caan claimed that making the 1982 film Kiss Me Goodbye was another factor in this self-imposed exile. Caan called it one of the worst experiences of his life and professed that director Robert Mulligan was the most incompetent filmmaker he had ever worked with. "A lot of mediocrity was produced", he said.

== See also ==
- Second weekend in box office performance § Second-weekend increase
- Over Her Dead Body
- Truly, Madly, Deeply
