= Priscilla Pointer =

American actress (1924–2025)

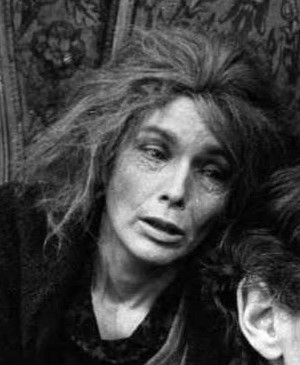
- Pointer c. 1968
- Born: Priscilla Marie Pointer; May 18, 1924; New York City, U.S.
- Died: April 28, 2025 (aged 100); Ridgefield, Connecticut, U.S.
- Occupation: Actress
- Years active: 1948–2014
- Spouses: Jules Irving (m. 1947; died 1979) Robert Symonds (m. 1980; died 2007)
- Children: 3, including David and Amy Irving
- Relatives: Austin Irving (granddaughter)

Priscilla Marie Pointer (May 18, 1924 – April 28, 2025) was an American actress of theater, film and television.

Pointer began her career in the theater in the late 1940s, including productions on Broadway, and later moved to Hollywood to pursue a television and film career beginning in the early 1950s. She was widely known for her recurring role as Rebecca Barnes Wentworth in the popular television series, Dallas.

== Background ==
Pointer was born on May 18, 1924, in New York City. Her mother, Augusta "Gus" Leonora Pointer (née Davis; 1898–1970), was a sculptor and an illustrator, and her father, Kenneth Keith Pointer (1890–1984), was an artist. One of her maternal great-grandfathers, Jacob Barrett Cohen, was from a Jewish family who had lived in the United States since the 1700s. Pointer turned 100 in May 2024.

Pointer was married to film and stage director Jules Irving, former artistic director of Lincoln Center, from 1947 until his death in 1979; they were the parents of Katie Irving, director David Irving, and actress Amy Irving. Through her daughter, she was mother-in-law of filmmakers Steven Spielberg and Bruno Barreto, respectively. She was the widow of Robert Symonds, whom she married in 1980.

== Career ==
=== Early career ===
Pointer was a performer from the late 1940s on, starting her career in theatre and appearing on Broadway as well as several tours in "A Streetcar Named Desire", "The Country Wife" and "The Condemned of Altona", She also featured in the TV series China Smith (also known as The New Adventures of China Smith) in 1954. After a long hiatus, Pointer returned to acting in the early 1970s.

Pointer's first major starring role was on the TV soap opera Where the Heart Is as Adrienne Harris Rainey from 1972 and 1973.

=== Films ===
Pointer appearances included Carrie (1976), in which she played the onscreen mother of Amy Irving's character; The Onion Field (1979); Mommie Dearest (1981); Twilight Zone: The Movie (1983); A Nightmare on Elm Street 3: Dream Warriors (1987); David Lynch's Blue Velvet; and Coyote Moon (1999). In addition to Carrie, she played the onscreen mother to Amy Irving in Honeysuckle Rose (1980) and Carried Away (1996). They were both in the films The Competition in 1980 and Micki & Maude in 1984.

Pointer appeared in three films directed by her son: Rumpelstiltskin (a 1987 musical version, which starred her daughter), Good-bye, Cruel World, and C.H.U.D. II: Bud the C.H.U.D.

=== Television ===
Pointer made many guest appearances on television, including Adam-12, L.A. Law, The A-Team, Judging Amy, The Rockford Files, and Cold Case.

From 1981 to 1983, Pointer had a recurring role on the soap opera Dallas as Rebecca Barnes Wentworth, the mother of Cliff Barnes (Ken Kercheval), Pamela Barnes Ewing (Victoria Principal), and Katherine Wentworth (Morgan Brittany). She appeared in 44 episodes.

== Death ==
Pointer died of natural causes on Monday, April 28, 2025 at an assisted living facility in Ridgefield, Connecticut. She was 100 years old, as announced by her daughter Amy Irving.

== Filmography ==
=== Film ===
Year	Title	Role(s)	Notes
1976	Carrie	Eleanor Snell	
1976	Nickelodeon	Mabel	
1976	The Great Texas Dynamite Chase	Miss Harris	
1977	The 3,000 Mile Chase	Emma Dvorak	
1977	Looking for Mr. Goodbar	Mrs. Dunn	
1979	The Onion Field	Chrissie Campbell	
1980	Honeysuckle Rose	Rosella Ramsey	
1980	The Competition	Mrs. Donellan	
1981	Mommie Dearest	Mrs. Chadwick	
1983	Good-bye, Cruel World	Myra	
1983	Twilight Zone: The Movie	Miss Cox	Segment: "Kick the Can"
1984	Micki & Maude	Diana Hutchison	
1985	The Falcon and the Snowman	Mrs. Lee	
1986	Blue Velvet	Mrs. Beaumont	
1987	Rumpelstiltskin	Queen Grizelda	
1987	A Nightmare on Elm Street 3: Dream Warriors	Dr. Elizabeth Simms	
1987	From the Hip	Mrs. Martha Williams	
1989	C.H.U.D. II: Bud the C.H.U.D.	Doctor Berlin	
1990	A Show of Force	Alice Ryan	
1990	Disturbed	Nurse Francine	
1992	Unbecoming Age	Grandma	
1993	Painted Desert	Barbara	
1996	Carried Away	Lily Henson	
1999	Inferno	Mrs. Henry Howard	
1999	The Rage: Carrie 2	Eleanor Snell	Archive footage (uncredited)
2010	Never Sleep Again: The Elm Street Legacy	Herself/Dr. Elizabeth Simms	Documentary

=== Television ===
Year	Title	Role	Notes
1954	China Smith (also known as The New Adventures of China Smith)	Carla Tilson/Iris Clarke	2 episodes
1969	N.Y.P.D.	Woman with child in park	Episode: "The Night Watch"
1970	The High Chaparral	Mrs. Colton	Episode: "A Matter of Vengeance"
1971	The Failing of Raymond	History Teacher	ABC Movie of the Week
1973	Adam-12	Jacqueline Carey	Episode: "Van Nuys Division: Pete's Mustache"
1977	Mary Jane Harper Cried Last Night	Laura Atherton	Television film
1978	Quincy, M.E.	Victim's mother	Episode: "Dead and Alive"
1981–1983	Dallas	Rebecca Barnes Wentworth	44 episodes
1984	The New Mike Hammer	Edna Grundy	Episode: "Seven Dead Eyes"
1984	Too Close for Comfort	Betty Farnsworth	Episode: "The Sound of Mother"
1984	St. Elsewhere	Marie Halloran	Episode: "In Sickness and in Health"
1986–1988	L.A. Law	Judge Dorothy M. Pehlman	4 episodes
1987	Newhart	Clara Whitscomber	Episode: "Me and My Gayle"
1987	Rags to Riches	Ruby	Episode: "Vegas Rock"
1990–1991	The Flash	Nora Allen	3 episodes
1994	ER	Mrs. Abernathy	Episode: "The Gift"
1997	Alone	Susan Hight	Television film
2001	Judging Amy	Margaret Palmer	Episode: "The Unforgiven"
2006	Cold Case	Lillian Vine	Episode: "Debut"
2008	Sweet Nothing in My Ear	Sally (voice)	Television film
