= Mandroid (disambiguation) =

A Mandroid is a fictional suit of power armor in Marvel Comics.

Mandroid(s), a portmanteau of man and android(s), may also refer to:

- Mandroid, a 2012 comedy special by Chris Hardwick
- Mandroid (film), a 1993 film starring Curt Lowens
- Mandroid Echostar, a progressive metal band from Canada
- Mandroid, a name used to describe character Frank Carter in the British comics series Starblazer
- Mandroid, an alternate costume for Mandy in the animated movie Billy & Mandy's Big Boogey Adventure
- Mandroid, the name of a primary character in the 1986 film Eliminators
- Mandroid, a 1986 computer game for the Commodore 64 released by CRL Group
- Man-droids, a group of half-organic, half-robotic beings in Starchaser: The Legend of Orin
- Mandroid, an antagonist in the animated series Transformers: EarthSpark
