= Dick Blau =

American photographer, filmmaker, professor

- Born: 1943 (age 82–83)

Dick Blau (born 1943) is a professor of film at the University of Wisconsin–Milwaukee, a photographer and film maker, and a figure in the study of photography of the family

== Personal life ==
Blau was born in 1943. His mother is actress Beatrice Manley, his biological father the painter Albert Freedberg, and his adoptive father is the theater director Herbert Blau, who raised him from the age of six. His longterm partner is Jane Gallop, a Distinguished Professor at the University of Wisconsin-Milwaukee. Together they have two children, Max and Ruby.

== Education ==
Blau holds a BA in English from Harvard University (1965) and a Ph.D. in American Studies from Yale University (1973). His doctoral thesis was titled, The body as ground of being in four novels of Herman Melville (later published as The Body Impolitic by Editions Rodopi, 1979).

== Career ==
Blau is a professor of film in the Peck School of the Arts at the University of Wisconsin-Milwaukee. His photographs and films have been exhibited internationally and are included in a number of museum collections.

His interests include portraiture, family dynamics, music and dance, gesture, ritual, and celebration.

Although Blau is best known for his work as a visual ethnographer, his photographic portraits of domestic life have appeared in the art tabloid Theory/Flesh; a 2009 Intervalles issue on Interdisciplinary Transcriptions; and the edited collection The M Word: Real Mothers in Contemporary Art (Demeter Press, 2011). Along with Robert Mapplethorpe, Sally Mann, and Nancy Honey, Dick Blau has been noted as one of the greatest modern photographers of children because his portraiture goes beyond "the stalling dichotomy of innocence versus corruption" (Libby Brooks, The Guardian). (See Also: Pictures of Innocence by Anne Higonnet, Thames and Hudson, 1998).

== Films ==
Some of Blau's films include Up the Block One Sunday (1982), Tintinnabula (1986), and Jidyll (1990), all of which are currently distributed by Canyon Cinema.

== Screen performances ==
Blau performed in films by several significant directors. He narrated James Benning's Used Innocence (1989), played Hamlet in Robert Nelson's Hamlet Act (1982), and appeared in Stuart Sherman's Fish Story (1983).

== Books ==
Bright Balkan Morning: Romani Lives and the Power of Music in Greek Macedonia, Photographs by Dick Blau, Text by Charles and Angeliki Keil, Soundscape by Steven Feld. (Wesleyan University Press, 2002). Blau's black-and-white photographs of Romani residents of the village of Iraklia create an enthographic portrait of a Balkan community.

Polka Happiness, a full-length study of Polish-American music and culture (co-authored by anthropologists Charles and Angeliki Keil) was published by Temple University Press in 1992. This book explores the dance music of generations of Polish Americans and emphasizes the shared sense of belonging embodied in "polka sociability."

Living With His Camera, Text by Jane Gallop/Photographs by Dick Blau (Duke University Press, 2003). Features photographs of Blau's own family alongside theoretical essays and personal reflections by Jane Gallop who invokes famous formulations of photography such as Roland Barthes' Camera Lucida and Susan Sontag's On Photography.

Skyros Carnival by Dick Blau, Agapi Amanatidis, Panayotis Panopoulos, and Steven Feld. A VoxLox Book, 2010. An experiment in art and anthropology documenting two trips to the oldest Dionysian carnival in Greece, the Goat Dance of Skyros. This multi-sensory book is made up of pictures, text, sound and video.

His most recent project Thicker Than Water: My Family in Photographs (1968–2012) (as yet unpublished), collects decades of personal family photography. Covering as much of the variety of family experience as he can in a range of settings that includes (among others) the kitchen, the bathroom, and the backyard, Blau looks at both the ordinary and the extraordinary aspects of family life. This book provides Blau's perspective on the material narrated by Gallop in Living With His Camera. He writes, "These pictures are spontaneous transcriptions of my experience, an ethnography of family life, a phenomenology of domestic emotion...By selecting a moment, then stilling and framing it, I try to retain some feeling of the event itself. At the same time, I use the abstract nature of the picture-making process to clear a space for reflection. These photographs are my part of a discourse. Notes to the people I live with and love".
