= Curt Lowens =

German-American actor (1925–2017)

- Born: Kurt Löwenstein; November 17, 1925; Allenstein, East Prussia, Germany (now Olsztyn, Poland)
- Died: May 8, 2017 (aged 91); Beverly Hills, California, U.S.
- Other names: Ben Joosten, Kurt Lowens
- Occupation: Actor
- Years active: 1959–2017

Curt Lowens (born Kurt Löwenstein; November 17, 1925 – May 8, 2017) was a German-American actor. A Holocaust survivor and rescuer, Lowens saved about 150 Jewish children during the Holocaust as a member of the Dutch resistance. After World War II, Lowens emigrated to the United States, where he became a film and stage actor.

== Early life ==
Born Kurt Löwenstein in the East Prussian town of Allenstein (now Olsztyn, Poland), his father was a respected lawyer, and his mother was active with several local Jewish community organizations. His father's career declined due to loss of clients after the Nazis' takeover of Germany, so the family moved to Berlin hoping that the city's large Jewish community could provide more protection. Young Curt continued to receive an education and to prepare for his bar mitzvah under the guidance of Rabbi Manfred Swarsensky of the Fasanenstrasse Synagogue. After the violence of Kristallnacht (also known as the November Pogrom) in November 1938, the Nazis closed his school. In early 1939, Lowens received his bar mitzvah in a school auditorium with 34 other youths.

== World War II and Holocaust ==
Lowens' older brother Heinz successfully emigrated to Britain a few months before the start of World War II. Curt and his parents planned to emigrate to the United States via the neutral Netherlands in early 1940. While waiting to depart from Rotterdam, however, the Germans invaded the Netherlands on the intended day of their departure. During the first two years of the German occupation, Curt's father worked at a desk job for the Jewish Council in Amsterdam, which initially saved the family from deportation to Auschwitz. Nonetheless, Curt and his mother were rounded up, unexpectedly, and deported to Westerbork in June 1943, but they were released through his father's connections.

The family subsequently went into hiding, each separately since individuals were more readily placed in homes of rescuers. Curt took on the false identity of "Ben Joosten". He managed to visit his mother when she, also under a false name, was treated at a hospital run by Catholic nuns; she died in January 1944. Curt, meanwhile, had become active in a network of Dutch rescuers, including Hanna Van de Voort and Nico Dohmen, aiding Jewish children in hiding. By war's end, some 150 Jewish children were rescued by this group alone. Curt Lowens also aided two downed American Army Air Corps flyers, for which he later received a commendation from General Dwight D. Eisenhower. After liberation, he joined the British Eighth Corps as an interpreter, aiding the British in their house arrest of the remaining Nazi leaders in Flensburg, Germany in mid-May 1945.

== Acting career ==
In 1947, Curt, his father, and step-mother emigrated to the United States, and he became a naturalized American citizen. He trained to become an actor, studying at the HB Studio in New York City. He made his Broadway debut in 1951, playing a prison camp guard in Stalag 17. He subsequently appeared in productions of The First Gentleman and The Sound of Music, among others.

In 1959, during the Hollywood on the Tiber era, he moved to Rome. He appeared in a string of Italian films, including Vittorio De Sica's Two Women (1960) and Nanni Loy's The Four Days of Naples (1962). He moved to Los Angeles in the mid-1960s, where he'd spend the rest of his life.

He appeared in over 100 films and TV shows. He was the voice of Abraham Van Helsing in the English dub of the anime OVA Hellsing Ultimate, and provided voice over work for video games like Lighthouse: The Dark Being and Medal of Honor. He also did German-language dubbing for Enter the Dragon (Roy Chiao), Animal House (John Vernon), Scarface (Harris Yulin), and Man on Fire (Giancarlo Giannini).

== Death ==
Lowens died on 8 May 2017 at the age of 91 in Beverly Hills.

== Partial filmography ==
- 1960 Two Women
- 1961 Francis of Assisi as Friar (uncredited)
- 1961 Werewolf in a Girls' Dormitory as Director Swift
- 1961 Barabbas as Disciple (uncredited)
- 1962 The Reluctant Saint
- 1962 The Four Days of Naples as Sakau (uncredited)
- 1962 Imperial Venus
- 1963 Il processo di Verona as German Captain
- 1966 Combat! (Episode: "Ask Me No Questions") as Captain Haus
- 1966 Blue Light (Episode: "Invasion by the Stars") as Colonel Dietrich
- 1966 Torn Curtain as VOPO Officer At Roadblock (uncredited)
- 1967 Hogan's Heroes (Episode: "Hogan and the Lady Doctor") as Gestapo Captain
- 1967 Tobruk as German Colonel
- 1968 Counterpoint as Captain Klingerman
- 1968 Garrison's Gorillas (TV Series) as Major Sturm / Colonel Krueger / Colonel Broiler
- 1969 The Secret of Santa Vittoria as Colonel Scheer
- 1971 The Mephisto Waltz as Agency Chief
- 1973 Trader Horn as Schmidt
- 1974 M*A*S*H (TV Series) as Luxembourg military Officer Colonel Blanche
- 1975 The Hindenburg as Elevator Man Felber
- 1976 The Swiss Conspiracy as Korsak
- 1977 The Other Side of Midnight as Henri Correger
- 1979 Missile X: The Neutron Bomb Incident as Russian Scientist
- 1979 Battlestar Galactica (TV series) "Greetings from Earth" episodes 19/20
- 1980 The Secret War of Jackie's Girls (TV Movie) as Dr. Kruger
- 1982 Firefox as Dr. Schuller
- 1982 The Entity as Dr. Wilkes
- 1983 To Be or Not To Be as Airport Officer
- 1983-1987 The A-Team (TV Series) as Soviet Embassy Official
- 1985 Knight Rider as Dr. Von Boorman
- 1988 Private War as Paul Devries
- 1989 Night Children
- 1991 Paid To Kill as Spinosa
- 1992 A Midnight Clear as Older German Soldier
- 1993 Mandroid as Drago
- 1993 Necronomicon as Mr. Hawkins (part 2)
- 1993 Invisible: The Chronicles of Benjamin Knight as Drago
- 1994 Babylon 5 (TV Series) as Varn
- 1995 Aurora: Operation Intercept as Dr. Zaborszin
- 1997 The Emissary: A Biblical Epic as Judas
- 1997 A River Made to Drown In as The Landlord
- 2005 The Cutter as Colonel Speerman
- 2006 Ray of Sunshine as The Count
- 2007 Hellsing Ultimate as Van Hellsing (English version, voice)
- 2008 Miracle at St. Anna as Dr. Everton Brooks
- 2009 Angels & Demons as Cardinal Ebner
- 2011 Supah Ninjas as Mechanov
- 2012 She Wants Me as Grandpa Arnie

== Partial stage credits ==
- Stalag 17 (1951–52, 48th Street Theatre) - SS Guard
- The First Gentleman (1957, Belasco Theatre) - Footman
- Postmark Zero (1965, Brooks Atkinson Theatre)
- The Sound of Music (1964, Mineola Playhouse) - Herr Zeller
- The Threepenny Opera (1965, New York City Center) - Jimmy
