= Jane Gallop =

American professor (born 1952)

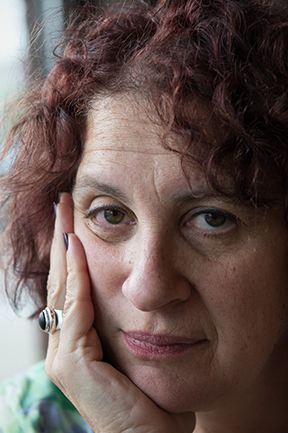
- Gallop in 2011
- Born: May 4, 1952 (age 74); Duluth, Minnesota, U.S.
- Education: Cornell University (BA, PhD)
- Occupations: Writer, academic professor
- Writing career
- Subjects: Feminist Theory, gender studies, psychoanalysis

Jane Anne Gallop (born May 4, 1952) is an American professor who since 1992 has served as Distinguished Professor of English and Comparative Literature at the University of Wisconsin–Milwaukee, where she has taught since 1990.

== Education ==
Gallop earned a A.B. at Cornell University in 1972, and a Ph.D. in French literature in 1976 at the same institution, as part of the Ford Foundation Six-Year Ph.D. Program. She taught in the French department at Miami University in Ohio. She was Herbert S. Autrey Professor of Humanities at Rice University, where she founded the women's studies program and chaired the Department of French and Italian. She has also taught or served as a visiting professor at Gettysburg College, Emory University, the University of Minnesota, Dartmouth College, Johns Hopkins University, and the Chicago Psychoanalytic Center.

== Career ==
Gallop is the author of ten books and nearly 100 articles. In addition to psychoanalysis, especially Jacques Lacan's psychoanalytic theory (particularly in the context of the American and French feminist responses to it), she has written on psychoanalysis and feminism; the Marquis de Sade; feminist literary criticism; pedagogy; accusations of sexual abuse; photography; queer theory; and ageing. She has said her writing can be understood "as the consistent application of a close reading method to theoretical texts." She has taught this method of close reading theory to her students for the past 35 years.

== Writings ==
Gallop's most controversial book addresses the issue of sexual harassment. In Feminist Accused of Sexual Harassment she documents her experience of being accused of sexual harassing two of her students while working as a university professor, and formulates a response.

Gallop also writes about her personal and professional experiences in Anecdotal Theory. She uses personal narrative as a starting point for critical essays in the hopes of producing a "more literary theory."

Living with His Camera (Duke University Press, 2003) focuses on the relationship between photography as art and photography as family history. Gallop explores how the photography of her longtime partner, University of Wisconsin–Milwaukee film professor Dick Blau, chronicles their relationship and also relationships between them and their two children, Max and Ruby. On the basis of black-and-white photographs of them that Blau regularly took, Gallop became interested in the implications of being the photograph's subject. Blau's talent for finding the perfect picture in the mundane moment is combined with Gallop's commentary as a subject and as a scholar. Each chapter involves analysis of an influential book concerning photography—including Roland Barthes's Camera Lucida and Susan Sontag's On Photography in relation to Blau's photographs. Gallop's analysis of what she finds in the photographs focuses on male/female relationships, childhood, sibling rivalry, intimate and erotic moments, and how the camera both captures and distorts these moments. Her conclusion is that the camera has become a "third person" in her relationship with Blau, creating the triangle of photographer, camera, and subject. Then too, the camera is able to show new angles, insights, flaws, and wonders that the individual people cannot themselves see without the camera's ability to freeze and frame moments and experiences in time.

Gallop's critical interest in time is further explored in The Deaths of the Author: Reading and Writing in Time (Duke University Press, 2011). In this book Gallop revisits a familiar concept in literary criticism, the so-called "death of the author", and considers not only the abstract theoretical death of the author but also the writer's literal death. Through close readings of the literary theorists Roland Barthes, Jacques Derrida, Eve Kosofsky Sedgwick, and Gayatri Chakravorty Spivak, she argues that the death of the author is best understood as a relation to temporality for both the reader and writer. She adds new connotations to the phrase and concept by connecting an author's theoretical, literal, and metaphoric deaths.

== Personal life ==
Gallop is a fan of the Milwaukee Bucks. She received some media coverage for a November 2013 incident when she and her husband gave player Giannis Antetokounmpo a ride after noticing him running on foot to the Bradley Center before a game on an 18 °F day.

In 1993, Gallop was accused of sexual harassment by two female students.

== Bibliography ==
- Intersections: A Reading of Sade with Bataille, Blanchot, and Klossowski. Lincoln: University of Nebraska Press, 1981.
- The Daughter's Seduction: Feminism and Psychoanalysis. London: Macmillan Press; and Ithaca: Cornell University Press, 1982.
- Reading Lacan. Ithaca: Cornell University Press, 1985.
- Thinking Through the Body. New York: Columbia University Press, 1988.
- Around 1981: Academic Feminist Literary Theory. New York: Routledge, 1991.
- Pedagogy: The Question of Impersonation. (ed.) Bloomington: Indiana University Press, 1995.
- Feminist Accused of Sexual Harassment. Duke University Press. 1997.
- Anecdotal Theory. Durham: Duke University Press, 2002.
- Living with His Camera. Durham: Duke University Press, 2003.
- The Deaths of the Author: Writing and Reading in Time. Durham: Duke University Press, 2011.
- Sexuality, Disability, and Aging: Queer Temporalities of the Phallus. Durham: Duke University Press, 2019.
- "What Happened in the 80s? On the Rise of Literary Theory in American Academia", Gallop in conversation with H. Aram Veeser, Anthem Press, December 23, 2020.
