= Good-bye, Cruel World =

1983 American comedy feature film

- Directed by: David Irving
- Written by: Nicholas Niciphor
- Starring: Dick Shawn; Cynthia Sikes
- Release date: 1983
- Country: United States

Good-bye, Cruel World is a 1983 American comedy feature film directed by David Irving and starring Dick Shawn and Cynthia Sikes. It was co-written by Shawn and Nicholas Niciphor. It features The Daily Show correspondent Larry Wilmore as a sergeant. Irving's mother, actress Priscilla Pointer, also appeared in the film.

== Plot ==
The film parodies the various gimmicks that were used to get audiences into theatres by claiming to be based on audience choice, although all of the selections are pre-selected, and the actual audience response is not measured within the theatre or by choices of the home viewer. The film was sold with images of a man flushing himself down the toilet. The story involves newscaster Rodney Pointsetter (Shawn) who is so depressed between his job and his family that he tries to make a film about his life, which he intends to culminate with his own suicide. It is often interrupted with irrelevant comic sketches that an emcee (Allan Stephan) claims that the audience prefers to see. One sketch features Angelique Pettyjohn as a stripping nun, and another Dan Frischman hosting "Things Your Parents Used to Say," while Rodney's gay brother, Ainsley, also played by Shawn, stages an opera in his house. The opera sequence was staged by John Hall of the Glyndebourne Festival Opera, and featured Vincent Cole, Johnny Guarnieri, Dennis Parnell, Tanino Provitera, David Romano, Gene Shaw, James Sterret Bryant, Starleigh Godfrey, Pam Scanlon, and Susan Grossman.
