= Shame, Shame on the Bixby Boys =

- Directed by: Anthony Bowers
- Screenplay by: William Bowers
- Starring: Monte Markham; Tom Rosqui; Sammy Jackson; Don "Red" Barry; Robert Symonds; Dee Cooper
- Cinematography: Michael Mileham
- Edited by: M. Edward Salier (as Edward Salier)
- Music by: Mark Fraze
- Distributed by: Custom Releasing Corporation
- Release date: 1978
- Running time: 90 minutes
- Country: United States
- Language: English
- Budget: $750,000

Shame, Shame on the Bixby Boys is a 1978 Western Comedy starring Monte Markham and written by William Bowers.

== Plot ==
While on his way to the gold fields Mordecai ended up for the past year hanging around a somewhat lawless settlement as Deputy to an over the hill Sheriff who when he isn't reminiscing about past glories pursues carnal pleasure by wooing a local wealthy widow thus far to no avail.

The deputy handles any gunfighters who enter town, mostly with shooting skill but sometimes instead with guile. His best friend Doc is the world's worst dentist, often having to evade irate patients after pulling the wrong tooth. Trilby his semi-girlfriend harbors matrimonial designs and is the only child of a prosperous feed and grain store owner who openly disdains his daughter's choice of suitor. Mordecai confides to Doc his lukewarm attitude toward Trilby, partly because he sees her as a bit crazy.

The main threat to law and order are the motley Bixby clan who blatantly rustle cattle from local herds then take it south to Mexico to sell. In a final showdown Mordecai faces off with the Bixbys aided (reluctantly) by the Sheriff and Doc along with a gunfighter he disarmed earlier that considers the lawman compared to the Bixbys the lesser of two evils. After a chaotic shootout in the old corral with minimal injuries the Bixbys surrender and go to jail.

Both the Sheriff and deputy are jilted as the widow marries Trilby's father while Trilby weds the former gunfighter. As a rainstorm strikes holes in the ceiling of the office allows cascades of water to soak them.

== Production ==
The film was shot at Paramount Ranch. In return for being allowed to use it they, "spruced up the town some and replaced some badly aging facades with a new one."

Shame Shame was directed by William Bowers' son, Anthony Bowers.

The crew was composed mostly of novices some of whom went on to significant careers in the industry including Dror Soref, Christopher Pearce (eventual CEO of Cannon Group) and Twink Caplan. Several entertainment veterans mentored the newcomers including Lee Garmes. Executive Producer Terry Fraze financed it himself when the initial funding proved inadequate.

== Release ==
It did not have a proper theatrical release.

It was shown on HBO in September 1980.

The commercial television premiere was January 12, 1983 on the CBS Late Movie.

It was being shown in syndication on local stations into the late 1980s.
