= Tati (film) =

1973 film

- Directed by: Bruno Barreto
- Written by: Bruno Barreto; Miguel Borges
- Story by: Anibal Machado
- Produced by: Luiz Carlos Barreto; Lucy Barreto
- Starring: Daniela Vasconcelos
- Cinematography: Murilo Salles
- Edited by: Raimundo Higino
- Music by: Dori Caymmi; Paulo César Pinheiro
- Release date: July 1973
- Running time: 87 minutes
- Country: Brazil
- Language: Portuguese

Tati is a 1973 Brazilian drama film directed by Bruno Barreto. It was entered into the 8th Moscow International Film Festival.

== Cast ==
- Dina Sfat as Manuela
- Daniela Vasconcelos as Tati
- Hugo Carvana as Capitão Peixoto
- Marcelo Carvalho
- Wilson Grey
- Noelza Guimaraes
- Vanda Lacerda
- Zezé Macedo
- Elizabeth Martins
- Geraldo Affonso Miranda (as Geraldo Miranda)
- Paulo Neves
- Fábio Sabag
