= Body and Soul (1999 film) =

- Directed by: Sam Henry Kass
- Produced by: Ray Mancini; Peter McAlevey
- Starring: Ray Mancini; Michael Chiklis; Jennifer Beals; Rod Steiger; Joe Mantegna; Tahnee Welch
- Cinematography: Arturo Smith
- Edited by: Mitchell Danton
- Production company: David Waters
- Distributed by: Metro-Goldwyn-Mayer
- Release date: September 11, 1999
- Running time: 91 minutes
- Country: United States
- Language: English
- Budget: $2.5 million

Body and Soul is a 1999 American sports drama film directed by Sam Henry Kass and starring Rod Steiger, Jennifer Beals, Michael Chiklis, Tahnee Welch, Ray Mancini, and Joe Mantegna. It is a remake of the 1947 film of the same name.

== Plot ==
Dreaming of making it as a professional, ambitious small-town boxer Charlie Davis (Ray Mancini) travels to Reno, Nevada with his unwavering friend Tiny O'Toole (Michael Chiklis). However, during his ascent to the top, he loses himself and forsakes the people he cares for most.

== Cast ==
- Ray Mancini as Charlie Davis
- Michael Chiklis as 'Tiny' O'Toole
- Jennifer Beals as Gina
- Rod Steiger as Johnny Ticotin
- Joe Mantegna as Alex Dumas
- Tahnee Welch as Felice Gillian
