= C.H.U.D. II: Bud the C.H.U.D. =

1989 film by David Irving

C.H.U.D II: Bud the C.H.U.D.
- UK DVD cover for the film
- Directed by: David Irving
- Written by: M. Kane Jeeves
- Produced by: Jonathan D. Krane
- Starring: Brian Robbins; Tricia Leigh Fisher; Gerrit Graham; Robert Vaughn; Bianca Jagger
- Cinematography: Arnie Sirlin
- Edited by: Barbara Pokras
- Music by: Nicholas Pike
- Production company: Lightning Pictures
- Distributed by: Vestron Pictures
- Release date: September 27, 1989
- Running time: 84 minutes
- Country: United States
- Language: English

C.H.U.D. II: Bud the C.H.U.D. is a 1989 zombie comedy film, It is sequel to C.H.U.D. (1984), directed by David Irving, written by M. Kane Jeeves and stars Brian Robbins, Tricia Leigh Fisher, Bianca Jagger, and Gerrit Graham in the title role.

== Plot ==
At the start of the film, the US Government has ordered a branch of the US Military to discontinue tests concerning "the C.H.U.D. project," which is built around the idea that enzymes taken from the sewer dwelling creatures from C.H.U.D. can make hyper-effective killing machines in the army. Bud Oliver, the last specimen of the experiment, who has come to be known as "Bud the C.H.U.D.," is hidden away in a Centers for Disease Control office in a small American town, from which a trio of bungling teenagers steal him, and accidentally reawaken him in doing so. Bud escapes and begins to forge an army of C.H.U.D.s.

== Cast ==
- Brian Robbins as Steve Williams
- Bill Calvert as Kevin
- Tricia Leigh Fisher as Katie Norton
- Gerrit Graham as Bud Oliver / Bud The C.H.U.D.
- Robert Vaughn as Colonel Masters
- Larry Cedar as Graves
- Bianca Jagger as Velma
- Larry Linville as Dr. Jewell
- Jack Riley as Wade Williams
- Sandra Kerns as Melissa Williams
- June Lockhart as Gracie
- Norman Fell as Tyler
- Rich Hall as Stan
- Robert Symonds as Proctor
- Priscilla Pointer as Dr. Berlin
- Marvin J. McIntyre as A Farmer
- Ritch Shydner as The Mailman
- Clive Revill as Dr. Kellaway
- Michael Bell as Mr. Williams
- Robert Englund as Man In Trenchcoat Walking with Trick-or-Treaters (uncredited cameo)

== Production ==
It is a loose sequel to C.H.U.D., mostly in name though the ties do carry on into dialogue and plot. As in the first film, C.H.U.D. stands for "Cannibalistic Humanoid Underground Dweller", but the alternative acronym (Contamination Hazard Urban Disposal) is not carried over.

The film was written by Ed Naha, who had previously written Honey, I Shrunk the Kids, under the pseudonym M Kane Jeeves, similar to the pseudonym Mahatma Kane Jeeves used by W. C. Fields.

Director David Irving shot three versions: one highlighting the comedy, one emphasizing the horror, and a less gory version for TV, and would decide on the balance of horror to comedy during editing.

Much of the soundtrack was written and performed by New Wave band Wall Of Voodoo with their second lineup featuring Andy Prieboy on vocals.

== Release ==
Originally intended for a theatrical release, the movie was released on VHS and laserdisc by Vestron Video on September 27, 1989.

In 2003, a DVD was released in the United Kingdom. In the U.S., the film is currently available on DVD from Lionsgate as part of an 8 horror movie DVD set. The film screened in June 2009 as Video on Demand at FEARnet. A Blu-ray release was released on November 22, 2016 by Lionsgate as part of their Vestron Video Collector's Series line.
