= Robert Symonds =

American actor (1926–2007)

- Born: December 1, 1926; Bristow, Oklahoma, U.S.
- Died: August 23, 2007 (aged 80); Los Angeles, California, U.S.
- Occupation: Actor
- Years active: 1954–2006
- Spouse: Priscilla Pointer (m. 1980)
- Children: 3

Robert Symonds (December 1, 1926 – August 23, 2007) was an American actor. He was the associate director of the Repertory Theater of Lincoln Center from 1965 through 1972.

== Career ==
His stage credits with the Lincoln Center include productions of The Caucasian Chalk Circle, Cyrano de Bergerac, The Miser, Twelfth Night, and A Streetcar Named Desire. His motion picture credits include The Exorcist (1973, as Dr. Taney), Linda Lovelace for President (1975), Gray Lady Down (1978), ...And Justice for All (1979), Superstition, The Ice Pirates (1984), Crimewave (1985), Rumpelstiltskin (1987), Mandroid (1993), Primary Colors (1998), Inferno (1999) and Catch Me If You Can (2002).

On television, Symonds played Benjamin Franklin in the 1976 PBS mini-series The Adams Chronicles and the recurring role of Dr. Jonas Edwards on Dynasty from 1982 to 1987, and guest-starred on many series, including The Rockford Files; M*A*S*H; Benson; Cheers; Quincy, M.E.; Star Trek: Deep Space Nine (as a Bajoran in the episode "Accession"); ER; Alias; and Cold Case (his last role in the episode "Static") and as Robert E. Lee in the 1982 miniseries The Blue and the Grey. In the early 1970s, Symonds created the role of psycho stalker Will Watts on the CBS soap opera Where the Heart Is. He also starred in an episode of Cheers called " Take My Shirt...Please".

== Personal life and death ==
Symonds was born in Bristow, Oklahoma, the son of Nellie (née Barry; 1886–1978) and Walter Stout Symonds (1891–1957). He married Elizabeth Janel Kaderli in 1952 and had three children; Victoria, Barry, and Rebecca. He and Janel divorced in 1969. He was married to actress Priscilla Pointer from 1980 until his death and was the step-father of actress Amy Irving and her siblings, David and Katie. He was the father of Vicki Morrison, Barry Symonds, and Becca Wooldridge.

He died on the morning of August 23, 2007, aged 80, from complications of prostate cancer.

== Filmography ==
Year	Title	Role	Notes
1973	The Exorcist	Dr. Taney	
1977	Tail Gunner Joe	Harry S. Truman	
1975	Linda Lovelace for President	Uncle Sam	
1978	Gray Lady Down	Secretary of Navy	
1978	Shame, Shame on the Bixby Boys	Pa Bixby	
1979	...And Justice for All	Judge Burns	
1982	Superstition	Pike	
1984	The Ice Pirates	Lanky Nibs	
1985	Crimewave	Guard #1	
1985	Riptide	General Ernie Collins	
1987	Rumpelstiltskin	Victor	
1989	C.H.U.D. II: Bud the C.H.U.D.	Proctor	
1993	Mandroid	Karl Zimmer	
1998	Primary Colors	Bart Nilson	
1999	Inferno	Henry Howard	
2002	Catch Me If You Can	Mr. Rosen	
2003	Virtua Cop 3	Frank Karanza	
