= Benício =

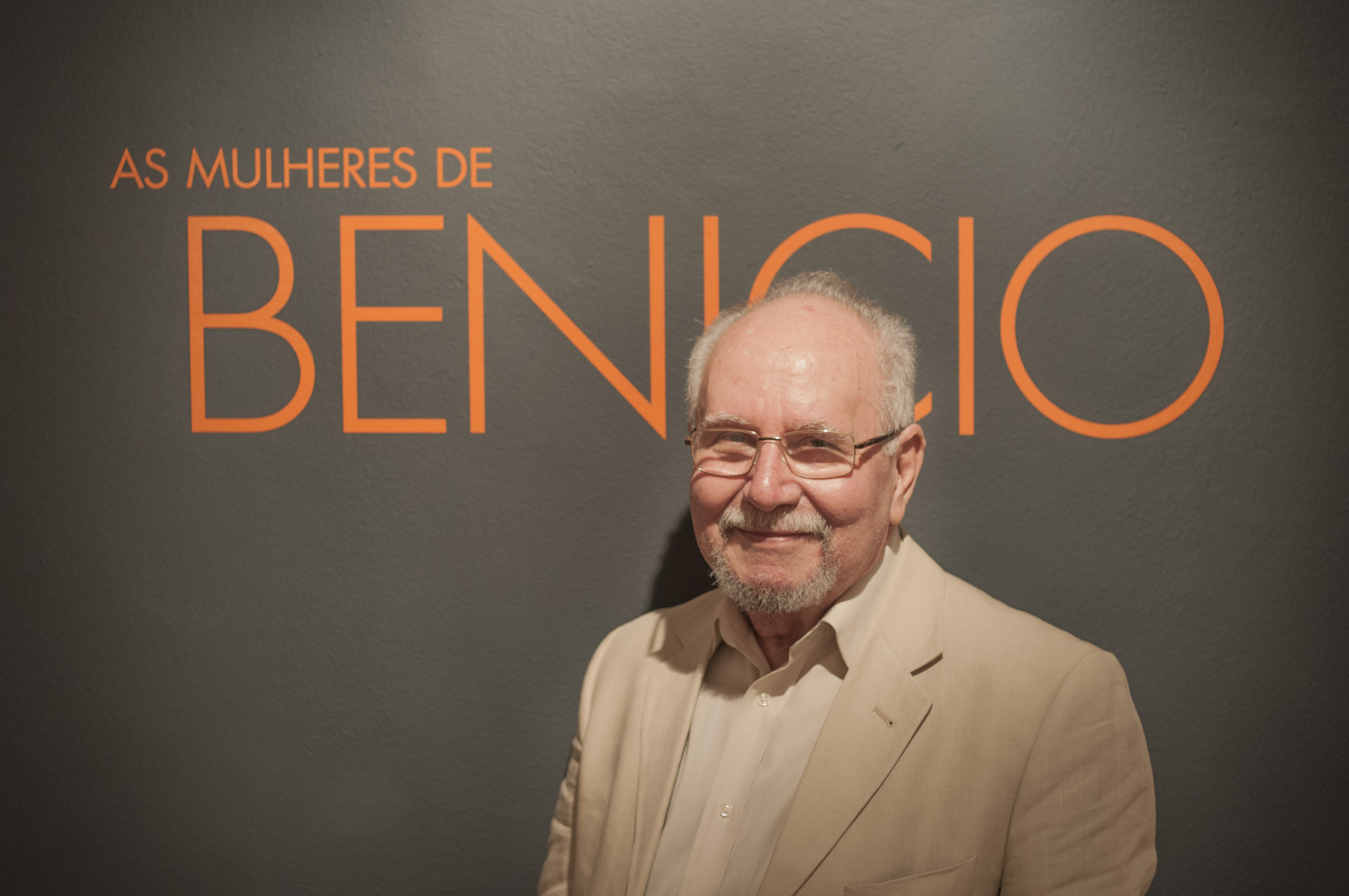
- Born: José Luís Benício da Fonseca; December 14, 1936; Rio Pardo, Rio Grande do Sul,Brazil
- Died: December 7, 2021 (aged 84); Rio de Janeiro,Brazil
- Website: http://www.benicioilustrador.com.br/

Benício, pen name of José Luiz Benício da Fonseca ( December 14, 1936 – December 7, 2021) was a Brazilian illustrator and designer.

He began his career in publishing in the 1950s, and his work helped shape the aesthetics of Brazilian cinema, navigating the most turbulent times of the dictatorship. A pianist in his teens, Benício abandoned music to dedicate himself to drawing and illustration. In his 50-year career, he created thousands of pocket booklet covers, over 300 Brazilian film posters, and hundreds of album covers, advertisements, and book illustrations.

Among his most famous works are the poster for the film Dona Flor and Her Two Husbands and the covers for the stories of Giselle, a espiã nua que abalou Paris, about the heroine who used her beauty and seduction to spy for the Allies in occupied Paris during World War II, and her daughter, Brigitte Montfort, the CIA agent known as Baby.

He was known as the "Brazilian pin-up master".

== Biography ==
Benício was born in the city of Rio Pardo, in 1936, in Rio Grande do Sul. He was 4 years old when his family moved to Porto Alegre. At 15, he was hired for his first formal job, at the Clarim advertising agency, also working as a pianist at Rádio Gaúcha, hidden from his mother.

== Career ==
He began as an apprentice artist in Porto Alegre and at just 16 years old, he moved to Rio de Janeiro in 1953, working in the art departments of advertising agencies and at Editora Rio Gráfica. Benício even illustrated romantic comics, written by Edmundo Rodrigues, but never considered himself suited to it.

In 1961, he began working for McCann Erickson Publicidade, doing important work for Coca-Cola, Esso, and other major clients. In 1963, he began working for Denison Propaganda. In the 1960s, he became famous for his illustrations of voluptuous women for the covers of pulp paperbacks published by the now-defunct Editora Monterrey, particularly the series "Memórias secretas de Giselle, a espiã nua que abalou Paris" (The secret memories of Giselle, the naked spy who shook Paris)" which featured texts by journalist David Nasser and hundreds of books from the ZZ7 collection, featuring Gisele's daughter, "Brigitte Montfort", also a sexy, attractive and voluptuous spy, adventures that had around 1,500 volumes published in four decades and became a phenomenon in the Brazilian paperback book market.

In the 1970s, he was the most sought-after poster illustrator for Brazilian cinema, producing over 300 posters in two decades. He also found himself forced to circumvent and negotiate with the military dictatorship's censorship authorities to get his work approved, including two images that became icons of Brazilian cinema: the poster for the pornochanchada A Super Fêmea, that launched Vera Fischer to stardom, and that of Dona Flor and Her Two Husbands, considered for more than thirty years the highest box-office film in the history of Brazilian cinema. He was also responsible for all the posters for the Os Trapalhões films. Benício considered his work on the poster for the 1972 film Independência ou Morte, for which Tarcísio Meira, who played the lead role of Dom Pedro I, posed live for him, to be the most elaborate of his career in this field.

Benício remained very active throughout the 1980s, always working with gouache paint, until the inauguration of President Fernando Collor, who closed Embrafilme and paralyzed film production in Brazil due to lack of funding. In 1992, he created an illustration for the label of the Catuaba Selvagem beverage, inspired by the character Conan the Barbarian.

With the so-called "Retomada" (Recovery) in the 2000s, and the replacement of paintbrushes by computers, making work cheaper, Benício's work in film became less sought after. With a career spanning over 50 years, illustrating architectural projects and authoring work for Veja, Playboy, and Isto É magazines, among others, Benício began to focus on illustrating advertisements and magazine articles in his private studio in Leblon, Rio de Janeiro.

=== Books ===
In 2011, Reference Press published the artbook Sex & Crime: The Book Cover Art of Benicio. At the end of 2012, Opera Graphica published E Benício criou a mulher, by journalist Gonçalo Junior, which tells the artist's personal and professional story and features more than 200 illustrations he created for various media outlets over the decades. The book is a revised, updated, revised, and expanded work of Benicio - Um perfil do mestre das pin-ups e dos cartazes de cinema, by the same author, released in 2006.

In 2014, Reference Press published the second volume of Sex & Crime: The Book Cover Art of Benicio, after a crowdfunding campaign on the Catarse website. In the first half of 2021, Benício was invited by Funarte to participate in the series "Memória Funarte", dedicated to recording the memories of important characters in Brazilian art.

== Later years and death ==
Benício had suffered two strokes until 2014, when he could no longer draw, as he had lost movement in his right hand.

Benício died on December 7, 2021, at the age of 84, in Rio de Janeiro. The cause of death was not revealed.
