= Austin Irving =

American artist and photographer

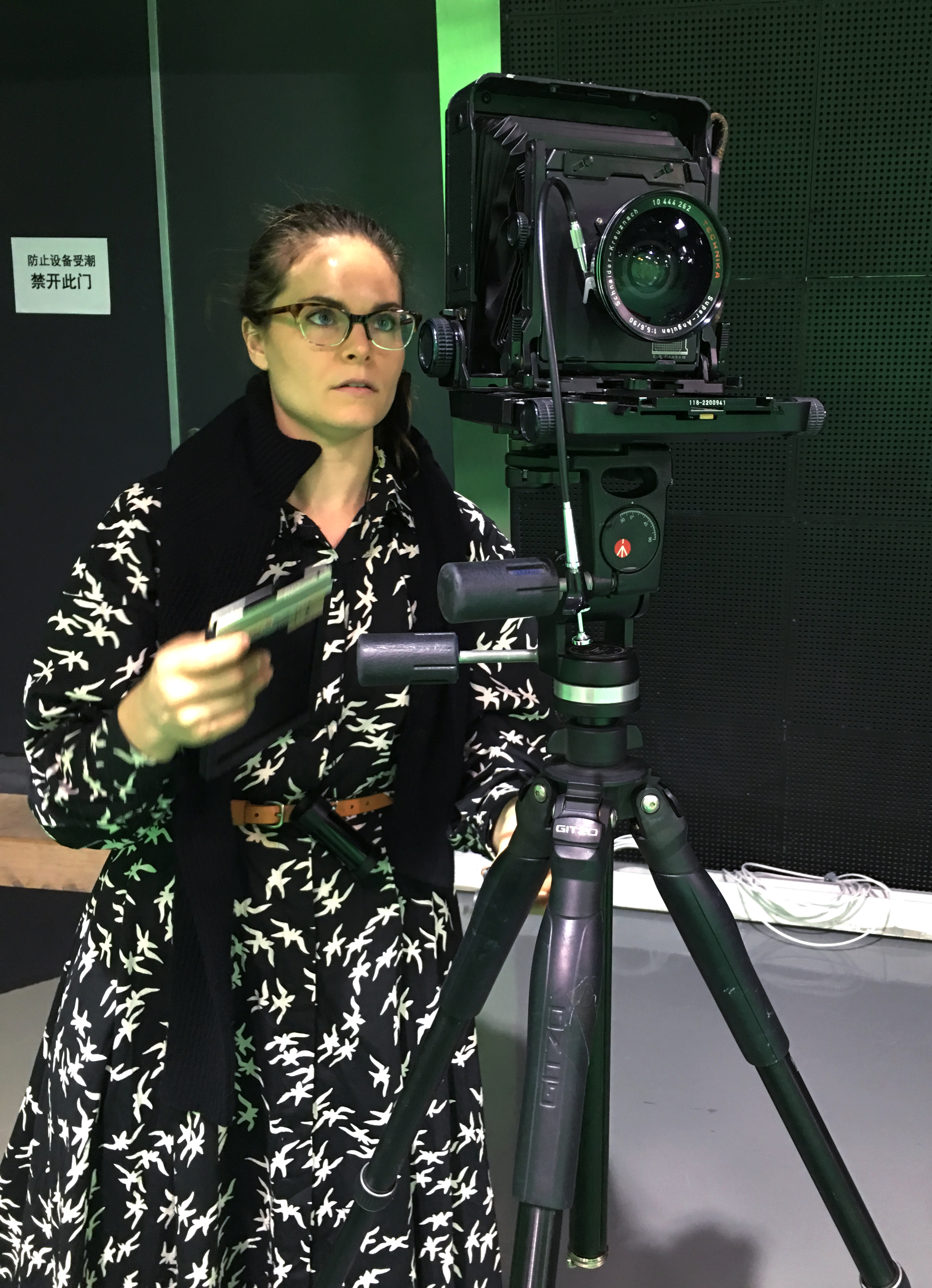
- Irving Shooting in Shenzhen, China in 2015
- Born: 1984 (age 41–42); New York City, New York, U.S.
- Education: New York University Tisch School of the Arts
- Occupation: Contemporary artist
- Years active: 2006–present
- Parents: David Irving (father); Susan Irving (mother)
- Relatives: Jules Irving (grandfather); Priscilla Pointer (grandmother); Amy Irving (aunt)
- Website: austinirving.com

Austin Irving (born 1984) is an American contemporary artist and photographer.

== Early life and education ==
Irving was born in New York City in 1984. She is the daughter of film director David Irving and landscape designer Susan Irving. Her paternal grandparents are theater director Jules Irving and the actress Priscilla Pointer. She is the niece of the actress Amy Irving. In 2006, Austin Irving graduated cum laude from the Tisch School Of The Arts at NYU with a BFA from the Department of Photography and Imaging.

== Career ==
Austin Irving works with large format analog photography. She uses a Toyo-View camera and shoots on 4x5 Kodak color negative. Her images are presented as large scale photographic prints. Her artwork has been the recipient of numerous awards and has been exhibited in galleries, museums and festivals in Hong Kong, India, Germany, Lithuania, France, Switzerland, Italy, Greece, Indonesia, Budapest, and in the United States. Her photographs explore liminality and metageography, anthropocentrism, and the tension between natural and man-made environments. She cites Thomas Demand, Bernd & Hilla Becher, MC Escher, René Magritte, Lynne Cohen, and James Turrell as artists whose work has impacted her career.

== Notable works ==
Not An Exit (2007–present) showcases real-world optical illusions created from narrow angles in functional hallways and doorways. These photographs have been called Escher-esque, a reference to M. C. Escher. The debut of this series in 2015 at Wilding Cran Gallery was reviewed in The LA Times by art critic Leah Ollman. In 2026, an image from this series was published in the New York Times alongside Thomas L. Friedman's article It’s Time to Cry Wolf Over A.I..

Show Caves (2009–present) has received significant media and academic interest for its interrogation of the ethics and impact of ecotourism, specifically the concept of government and commercially operated show caves. As a result, Irving was asked to sit on a panel for a public forum on rural economies at Virginia Tech's annual conference for Appalachian Studies Association, where the socio-economic impact of commodifying rural arts, culture, environment, and heritage to create a tourist industry in rural Appalachia was debated. In 2021, an image from this series was named Best in Show at the Florida Museum of Photographic Arts' International Photography Competition.

== Exhibitions ==
Irving's solo exhibitions have included ''Portals'' at Curio Gallery in Los Angeles (2012), "Caves" at the Silverlake Art Company (2013), ''Not An Exit'' (2015), ''Cornered (2018), and ''Night Lights'' (2025) at Wilding Cran Gallery.

Selected group exhibitions include "MOCA Fresh Auction" at The Museum of Contemporary Art (2012), "Hong Kong Identity & Illusion" at Light Stage Gallery, Hong Kong (2016), "Re-Imaging a Safe Space" at the Gulf & Western Gallery, TISCH New York University co-curated by Deborah Willis and Melissa Harris (2017), "Extreme Appalachia" at the Armory Gallery, Virginia Tech (2017), ''Every Woman Biennial'' in Los Angeles (2019), "The Edge Effect" at The Katonah Museum of Art (2019), ''A Curious Horizon'' at the Irvine Fine Arts Center (2020), ''Photography: A Sense of Place'' at Site Gallery (2021), ''Modern Analog'' at the Dallas Center for Photography (2023), ''Landscape: Constructed & Wild'' at Site Gallery (2023), ''FRESH'' at Klompching Gallery in Brooklyn (2024), and ''10 Years'' at Wilding Cran Gallery in Los Angeles (2024).

In 2025, Irving participated in ''Broken Ground'', a group exhibition presented by the Photographic Arts Council Los Angeles, alongside Paula Chamlee, Erinn Springer, and Margeaux Walter. She also participated "Photos on Fridges" an exhibition at Harkawik in New York in 2025.

== Awards and collections ==
Irving has received awards and recognition from a number of international photography organizations including the Architecture MasterPrize, Aesthetica Art Prize, Budapest International Foto Awards, International Photography Awards, Prix de la Photographie Paris, Tokyo International Foto Awards, Analog Sparks, American Photography, Annual Photography Awards, among others.

Her work is included in the collections of The Florida Museum of Photographic Arts, Aileen Getty, Beth DeWoody, and Helene Winer.
