= Amy Irving =

American actress and singer (born 1953)

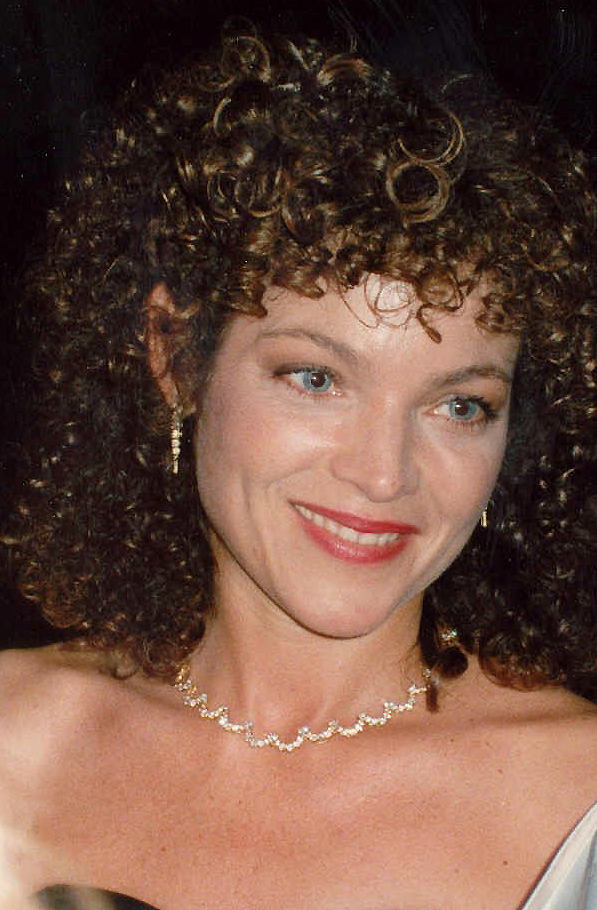
- Irving at the Governor's Ball Party after the 1989 Academy Awards
- Born: September 10, 1953 (age 73); Palo Alto, California, U.S.
- Education: American Conservatory Theater; London Academy of Music and Dramatic Art
- Occupation: Actress
- Years active: 1965–present
- Spouses: Steven Spielberg (m. 1985; div. 1989); Bruno Barreto (m. 1996; div. 2005); Kenneth Bowser (m. 2007)
- Children: 3
- Parents: Jules Irving (father); Priscilla Pointer (mother)
- Relatives: David Irving (brother); Austin Irving (niece)

Amy Irving (born September 10, 1953) is an American actress and singer, who has worked in film, stage, and television. Her accolades include an Obie Award, and nominations for two Golden Globe Awards and an Academy Award.

Born in Palo Alto, California, to actors Jules Irving and Priscilla Pointer, Irving was involved in theater in San Francisco before her family moved to New York City during her teenage years. In New York, she made her Broadway debut in The Country Wife (1965–1966) at age 13. Irving studied theater at San Francisco's American Conservatory Theater and at the London Academy of Music and Dramatic Art. She made her feature film debut in Brian De Palma's Carrie (1976) and had a lead role in The Fury, a 1978 supernatural thriller.

In 1980, Irving appeared in a Broadway production of Amadeus and the film Honeysuckle Rose (1980). She was cast in Barbra Streisand's musical epic Yentl (1983), for which she was nominated for the Academy Award for Best Supporting Actress. In 1988, she received an Obie Award for her Off-Broadway performance in a production of The Road to Mecca, and was nominated for a Golden Globe Award for her performance in the comedy Crossing Delancey (1988).

Irving went on to appear in the original Broadway production of Broken Glass (1994) and the revival of Three Sisters (1997). In film, she starred in the ensemble comedy Deconstructing Harry (1997), and reprised her role as Sue Snell in The Rage: Carrie 2 (1999) before co-starring opposite Michael Douglas in Steven Soderbergh's crime-drama Traffic (2000). She appeared in the independent films Thirteen Conversations About One Thing (2001) and Adam (2009). From 2006 to 2007, she starred in the Broadway production of The Coast of Utopia. In 2018, she reunited with Soderbergh, appearing in a supporting role in his horror film Unsane (2018).

== Early life ==
Irving was born on September 10, 1953, in Palo Alto. Her father was film and stage director Jules Irving (born Jules Israel) and her mother was actress Priscilla Pointer. Her brother is writer and director David Irving and her sister, Katie Irving, is a singer and teacher of deaf children. Irving's father was of Russian-Jewish descent, and one of Irving's maternal great-great-grandfathers was also Jewish. Irving was raised in her mother's faith of Christian Science, and her family observed no religious traditions.

Her father co-founded the Actor's Workshop and she was active in local theater as a child. She attended the American Conservatory Theater in San Francisco in the late 1960s and early 1970s, and appeared in several productions there. She also trained at the London Academy of Music and Dramatic Art. As a teenager, Irving moved with her family to Manhattan, New York, where her father was appointed the director of the Lincoln Center Repertory Theater. She graduated from the Professional Children's School and made her Off-Broadway debut at age 17 in And Chocolate on Her Chin.

== Career ==
Irving's first stage appearance was at nine months old in the production "Rumplestiltskin" where her father brought her on the stage to play the part of his child whom he trades for spun gold. Then at age two, she portrayed a bit-part character ("Princess Primrose") in a play which her father directed. She had a walk-on role in the 1965–66 Broadway show The Country Wife at age 12. Her character was to sell a hamster to Stacy Keach in a crowd scene. The play was directed by family friend Robert Symonds, the associate director of the Lincoln Center Repertory Theater, and who later became her stepfather after her father died and her mother remarried. Within six months of returning to Los Angeles from London Academy of Music and Dramatic Art in the mid-1970s, Irving was cast in a major motion picture and was working on various TV projects such as guest spots in Police Woman, Happy Days, and a lead role in the mini-series epic Once an Eagle opposite veterans Sam Elliott and Glenn Ford, and a young Melanie Griffith. She played Juliet in Romeo and Juliet at the Los Angeles Free Shakespeare Theatre in 1975, and returned to the role at the Seattle Repertory Theatre (1982–1983).

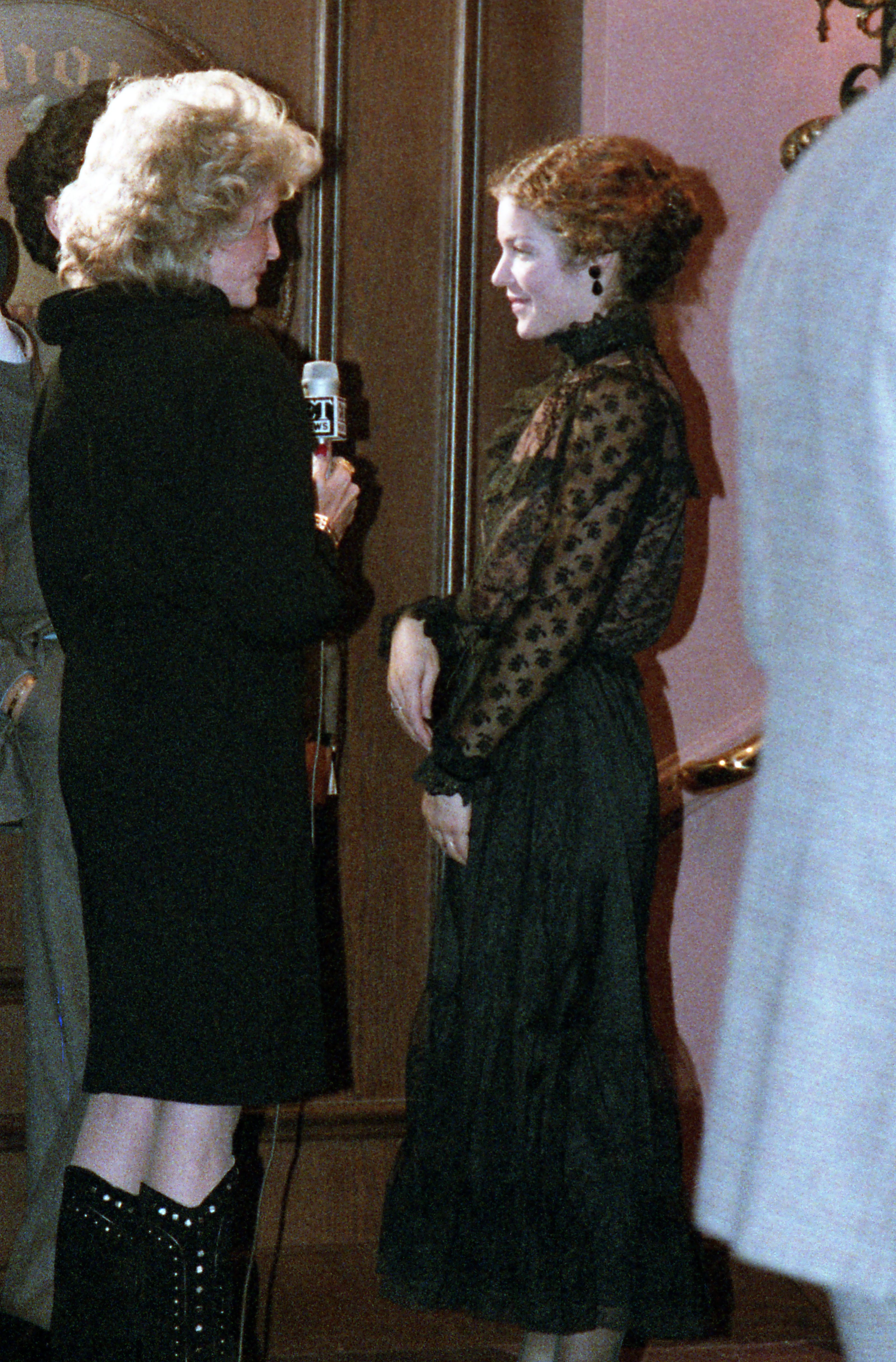
Irving at the opening night for Heartbreak House, December 1983

Irving auditioned for the role of Princess Leia in Star Wars, which went to Carrie Fisher. She then starred in the Brian DePalma-directed films Carrie as Sue Snell (her mother was also in Carrie), and The Fury as Gillian Bellaver. In 1999, she reprised her role as Sue Snell in The Rage: Carrie 2. She starred with Richard Dreyfuss in 1980 in The Competition. Also in 1980, she appeared in Honeysuckle Rose, which also marked her on-screen singing debut. Both her and Dyan Cannon's characters were country-and-western singers, and both actresses did their own singing in the film. In 1983, she featured in Barbra Streisand's directorial debut, Yentl, for which she received an Academy Award nomination for Best Supporting Actress. In 1984, she co-starred in Micki + Maude. In 1988, she was in Crossing Delancey (for which she received a Golden Globe nomination). That same year, she also gave another singing performance in the live-action/animated film Who Framed Roger Rabbit, providing the singing voice for Jessica Rabbit. In 1997, she appeared in Woody Allen's Deconstructing Harry. Irving also appeared in the TV show Alias as Emily Sloane, portrayed Princess Anjuli in the big-budget miniseries epic The Far Pavilions and headlined the lavish TV production Anastasia: The Mystery of Anna. More recently Irving appeared in the films Traffic (2000), Tuck Everlasting (2002), Thirteen Conversations About One Thing (2002) and an episode of Law & Order: Special Victims Unit in 2001.

Irving's stage work includes Amadeus (replacing Jane Seymour due to pregnancy) at the Broadhurst Theatre for nine months, Heartbreak House with Rex Harrison at the Circle in the Square Theatre, Broken Glass at the Booth Theatre and Three Sisters with Jeanne Tripplehorn and Lili Taylor at the Roundabout Theatre. Additional Off-Broadway credits include: The Heidi Chronicles; The Road to Mecca; The Vagina Monologues in both London and New York; The Glass Menagerie with her mother, actress Priscilla Pointer; Celadine, a world premiere at George Street Playhouse in New Brunswick, New Jersey; and the 2006 one-woman play, A Safe Harbor for Elizabeth Bishop. In 1994, she and Anthony Hopkins hosted the 48th Tony Awards at the Gershwin Theatre, New York.

Irving's last Broadway appearance was in the American premiere of Tom Stoppard's The Coast of Utopia at New York's Lincoln Center during its 2006–07 season. In 2009, she played the title role in Saint Joan, in an audio version by the Hollywood Theater of the Ear. In May 2010, Irving made her Opera Theatre of Saint Louis debut in the role of Desiree Armfeldt in Isaac Mizrahi's directorial debut of Stephen Sondheim's A Little Night Music. In October 2010, Irving guest-starred in "Unwritten," the third episode of the seventh season of the Fox series House M.D.. In 2013, Irving appeared in a recurring role in Zero Hour. In 2018, she co-starred in the psychological horror film Unsane, directed by Steven Soderbergh.

In April 2023, Irving released her first album, Born In a Trunk, featuring 10 cover songs pulled from her life and career.

== Personal life ==
Irving dated American film director Steven Spielberg from 1976 to 1980. She then had a brief relationship with Willie Nelson, her co-star in the film Honeysuckle Rose. The breakup with Spielberg cost her the role of Marion Ravenwood in Raiders of the Lost Ark, which he had offered to her at the time, but they reunited and were married from 1985 to 1989. She received an estimated $100 million divorce settlement after a judge controversially vacated a prenuptial agreement that had been written on a napkin.

In 1989, she became romantically and professionally involved with Brazilian film director Bruno Barreto; they were married in 1996 and divorced in 2005. She has two sons: Max Samuel (with Spielberg), born June 13, 1985; and Gabriel Davis (with Barreto), born May 4, 1990.

She married Kenneth Bowser Jr., a documentary filmmaker, in 2007. He has a daughter, Samantha, from a previous marriage with entertainment lawyer Marilyn Haft. The couple live in a barn converted into a home in rural Westchester County, New York. The building burned down in a fire in 2009, but the couple rebuilt it on the same spot with reclaimed wood, and still live there as of 2025, when the house was profiled in The New York Times "At Home" series. Irving also owns a $9M apartment in New York City which she purchased in 2015.

== Filmography ==
=== Film ===
| Year(s) | Play | Role | Notes | Ref. |
|---|---|---|---|---|
| 1976 | Carrie | Sue Snell | | |
| 1978 | The Fury | Gillian Bellaver | | |
| 1979 | Voices | Rosemarie Lemon | | |
| 1980 | Honeysuckle Rose | Lily Ramsey | | |
| 1980 | The Competition | Heidi Joan Schoonover | | |
| 1983 | Yentl | Hadass Vishkower | | |
| 1984 | Micki & Maude | Maude Salinger | | |
| 1987 | Rumpelstiltskin | Katie | | |
| 1988 | Crossing Delancey | Isabelle Grossman | | |
| 1988 | Who Framed Roger Rabbit | Jessica Rabbit | Singing voice | |
| 1990 | A Show of Force | Kate Melendez | | |
| 1991 | An American Tail: Fievel Goes West | Miss Kitty | Voice | |
| 1993 | Benefit of the Doubt | Karen Braswell | | |
| 1995 | Kleptomania | Diana Allen | | |
| 1995 | Call of the Wylie | Mel | Short film | |
| 1996 | Carried Away | Rosealee Henson | | |
| 1996 | I'm Not Rappaport | Clara Gelber | | |
| 1997 | Deconstructing Harry | Jane | | |
| 1998 | One Tough Cop | FBI Agent Jean Devlin | | |
| 1999 | The Confession | Sarah Fertig | | |
| 1999 | The Rage: Carrie 2 | Sue Snell | | |
| 1999 | Blue Ridge Fall | Ellie Perkins | | |
| 2000 | Bossa Nova | Mary Ann Simpson | | |
| 2000 | Traffic | Barbara Wakefield | | |
| 2001 | Thirteen Conversations About One Thing | Patricia | | |
| 2002 | Tuck Everlasting | Mother Foster | | |
| 2005 | Hide and Seek | Alison Callaway | | |
| 2009 | Adam | Rebecca Buchwald | | |
| 2018 | Unsane | Angela Valentini | | |
| 2021 | A Mouthful of Air | Bobbi Davis | | |

=== Television ===
| Year(s) | Play | Role | Notes | Ref. |
|---|---|---|---|---|
| 1975 | The Rookies | Cindy Mullins | Episode: "Reading, Writing and Angel Dust" | |
| 1975 | Police Woman | June Hummel | Episode: "The Hit" | |
| 1975 | Happy Days | Olivia | Episode: "Tell It to the Marines" | |
| 1976 | James Dean | Norma Jean | Television film | |
| 1976 | Dynasty | Amanda Blackwood | Television film | |
| 1976 | Panache | Anne | Television film | |
| 1976–1977 | Once an Eagle | Emily Pawlfrey Massengale | 7 episodes | |
| 1977 | I'm a Fool | Lucy | Television film | |
| 1984 | The Far Pavilions | Anjuli | 3 episodes | |
| 1985 | Great Performances | Ellie Dunn | Episode: "Heartbreak House" | |
| 1986 | Anastasia: The Mystery of Anna | Anna Anderson | Television film | |
| 1989 | Nightmare Classics | The Governess | Episode: "The Turn of the Screw" | |
| 1994 | Twilight Zone: Rod Serling's Lost Classics | Melissa Sanders | Episode: "The Theatre" | |
| 1998 | Stories from My Childhood | Anastasia | Voice, episode: "Beauty and the Beast" | |
| 1999 | Spin City | Lindsay Shaw | Episode: "The Great Debate" | |
| 2001 | Law & Order: Special Victims Unit | Rebecca Ramsey | Episode: "Repression" | |
| 2001 | American Masters | Novels | Voice, episode: "F. Scott Fitzgerald: Winter Dreams" | |
| 2002–2005 | Alias | Emily Sloane | 9 episodes | |
| 2010 | House | Alice Tanner | Episode: "Unwritten" | |
| 2011 | A Night at the Movies: The Horrors of Stephen King | Herself/ Sue Snell (archive footage) | Television Film Documentary | |
| 2013 | Zero Hour | Melanie Lynch | 10 episodes | |
| 2015 | The Good Wife | Phyllis Barsetto | Episode: "Innocents" | |
| 2018 | The Affair | Nan | Episode #4.5 | |
| 2019 | Soundtrack | Polly | 2 episodes | |

== Stage credits ==
| Year(s) | Play | Role | Notes | Ref. |
|---|---|---|---|---|
| 1965–1966 | The Country Wife | Ensemble | Vivian Beaumont Theatre | |
| 1975 | Romeo and Juliet | Juliet Capulet | Los Angeles Free Shakespeare Society | |
| 1981–1982 | Amadeus | Costanze Weber | Broadhurst Theatre | |
| 1982 | Romeo and Juliet | Juliet Capulet | Seattle Repertory Theatre | |
| 1983 | Blithe Spirit | Elvira | Festival Theatre, Santa Fe, New Mexico | |
| 1983–1984 | Heartbreak House | Ellie Dunn | Circle in the Square Theatre | |
| 1984 | The Glass Menagerie | Laura | Festival Theatre, Santa Fe, New Mexico | |
| 1987 | Three Sisters | Masha | Williamstown Theatre Festival | |
| 1988 | The Road to Mecca | Elsa Barlow | Promenade Theater, New York | |
| 1990 | The Heidi Chronicles | Heidi | Doolittle Theatre, Los Angeles | |
| 1994 | Broken Glass | Sylvia Gellburg | Booth Theatre | |
| 1997 | Three Sisters | Olga | Criterion Center Stage Right | |
| 2002 | The Guys | Joan | The Bat Theatre Company, New York | |
| 2002 | Ghosts | Mrs. A. | Classical Stage Co. | |
| 2004 | The Exonerated | | Bleecker Street Theatre | |
| 2004 | Celadine | Celadine | George Street Playhouse | |
| 2006 | A Safe Harbor for Elizabeth Bishop | Elizabeth Bishop | 59E59 Theaters | |
| 2006 | The Coast of Utopia: Part I | Varvara | Vivian Beaumont Theatre | |
| 2006–2007 | The Coast of Utopia: Part II | Maria Ogarev | Vivian Beaumont Theatre | |
| 2008 | The Waters of March | | Summer Shorts Festival, New York | |
| 2010 | A Little Night Music | Desiree Armfeldt | Opera Theatre of Saint Louis | |
| 2011 | We Live Here | Maggie | Manhattan Theatre Club | |
| 2019 | Lady in the Dark | Dr. Brooks | New York City Center | |

== Albums ==
List of albums, with selected chart positions and certifications, showing other relevant details
| Title | Album details | Peak chart positions | | | | | Certifications |
| Title | Album details | US | US Country | AUS | CAN | CAN Country | Certifications |
|---|---|---|---|---|---|---|---|
| Honeysuckle Rose (credited as "Willie Nelson and Family") | Released: July 18, 1980; Label: Columbia; Formats: LP, cassette | 11 | 1 | 3 | 24 | 4 | MC: Gold; RIAA: Platinum |
| Born in a Trunk | Released: April 7, 2023; Label: Queen of the Castle Records; Formats: Digital | | | | | | |

== Accolades ==
| Year | Award | Category | Nominated work | Outcome | Ref. |
|---|---|---|---|---|---|
| 1984 | Academy Awards | Best Supporting Actress | Yentl | Nominated | |
| 1984 | Drama Desk Award | Outstanding Featured Actress in a Play | Heartbreak House | Nominated | |
| 1987 | Golden Globe Awards | Best Actress – Miniseries or Television film | Anastasia: The Mystery of Anna | Nominated | |
| 1988 | Obie Awards | Distinguished Performance by an Actress | The Road to Mecca | Won | |
| 1988 | Drama Desk Award | Outstanding Actress in a Play | The Road to Mecca | Nominated | |
| 1989 | Golden Globe Awards | Best Actress – Motion Picture Comedy or Musical | Crossing Delancey | Nominated | |
| 1994 | Drama Desk Award | Outstanding Actress in a Play | Broken Glass | Nominated | |
| 2001 | Screen Actors Guild Awards | Outstanding Cast in a Motion Picture | Traffic | Won | |
