= Jules Irving =

American director (1925–1979)

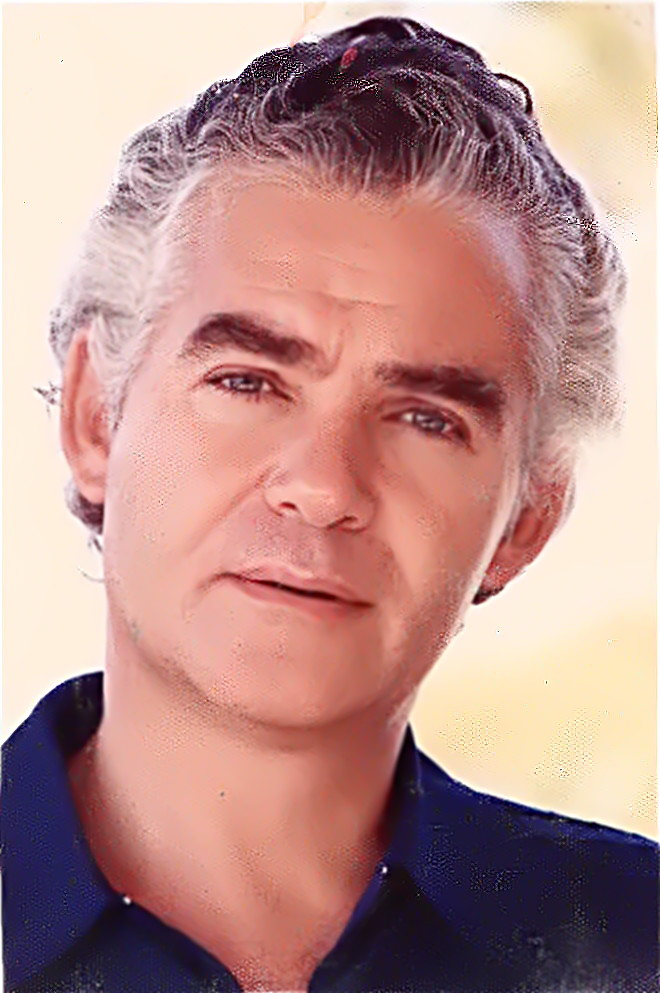
- Born: Julius Israel; April 13, 1925; New York City, U.S.
- Died: July 28, 1979 (aged 54); Reno, Nevada, U.S.
- Education: New York University; Stanford University
- Occupations: Director; educator; producer; actor
- Years active: 1952–1979
- Spouse: Priscilla Pointer (m. 1947)
- Children: 3, including David and Amy
- Relatives: Austin Irving (granddaughter)

Jules Irving (born Julius Israel; April 13, 1925 – July 28, 1979) was an American director, educator, producer and actor, who in the 1950s co-founded the San Francisco Actor's Workshop. When the Actor's Workshop closed in 1966, Irving moved to New York City and became the first Producing Director of the Repertory Company of the Vivian Beaumont Theater of Lincoln Center.

In 1955, the Actor's Workshop was the first West Coast theater to sign an Equity "Off-Broadway" contract. Irving had started the Workshop with fellow New Yorker Herbert Blau, whom he knew from undergraduate days at New York University and then during graduate study at Stanford University. Both men were professors at San Francisco State, with Irving serving in the Drama department and Blau in English.

He was active in school shows and made his Broadway debut at the age of thirteen in George S. Kaufman's The American Way. He joined the army in 1943, serving in the infantry during the Battle of the Bulge and as a Russian translator when his unit met Soviet forces. After V-E Day, he transferred to Special Services and had the opportunity to hone his theater managerial skills as he organized camp shows under Joshua Logan.

== San Francisco Actor's Workshop, 1952–1966 ==
The Actor's Workshop was established January 16, 1952 in a loft above a judo academy on Divisadero Street in San Francisco and remained until its formal demise in 1966. The Actor's Workshop set new standards as a pioneer of resident professional art theater in the United States.

Among those present in 1952 for a "study group" or "workshop" were Irving, Blau, their wives (Priscilla Pointer and Beatrice Manley); Hal J. Todd, who had been at Stanford with Irving and Blau; Richard Glyer, an instructor at San Francisco State University; Paul Cox, an aspiring playwright; and S.F. State student Dan Whiteside.

Irving guided the theater's finances and led primary day-by-day operations of the company's growth to its Elgin Street playhouse and then to offices on Folsom Street and two year-round theaters, the Encore and the Marines' Memorial. A major transition occurred in 1956 when the Workshop was evicted from Elgin Street to make room for a new freeway. The company had the option to renew its lease on the Marines' Memorial Theater but no money. A young Canadian, Alan Mandell, who as a volunteer Business Manager (and de facto chief executive with Irving) helped inaugurate the first subscription season for the Actor's Workshop.

Irving and Blau were insistent idealists who developed the Workshop in the tradition of the Group Theatre of the 1930s; they and key company members were dedicated to principles of social responsibility and ensemble artistry. The troupe's repertoire focused initially on Miller and other modern American writers, such as Odets, O'Neill, and Tennessee Williams, but soon expanded to the contemporary world dramas of Samuel Beckett, Brecht, Genet, John Osborne, Yukio Mishima, and Harold Pinter.

Respected as an actor as well as director, Irving played major roles, including Proctor in The Crucible and Happy in Death of a Salesman (which he also directed) in the Workshop's productions of Arthur Miller plays. When the Workshop produced the west coast premiere of Beckett's Waiting for Godot, Irving was the loquacious servant, Lucky.

The production played to the Workshop's regular audiences, then performed for inmates at San Quentin prison and on to the 1958 Brussels World's Fair where it represented American theater under the aegis of the US State Department.

The travel to Brussels was not without incident. Irving was informed that the Workshop would need to fund its own travel to get to Belgium. After weeks of fund-raising and while the company was still in New York, he received word that it would be "inadvisable" for a particular stage manager, James Kershaw, to travel on to Brussels. The opaque State Department communications left Irving and Blau to speculate while officials would not go on record that perhaps some liberal activity had brought negative attention down on Kershaw, a respected company member. The Workshop protested but, in the end, feeling a responsibility to San Franciscans who had provided travel funds, proceeded to Brussels with Pointer replacing the stage manager for the occasion.

In addition to his acclaimed abilities as the director of such Workshop productions as The Entertainer, Misalliance, The Glass Menagerie, and The Caretaker, Irving proved his skills as a financial manager over many years, shrewdly learning "by necessity," according to San Francisco writer Mark Harris, "a hundred-and-one uses for the pennies of a dollar." Irving always had to struggle to keep the Workshop solvent. In doing so, he protected the company's artistic independence. He was thus extremely cautious in the late 1950s when the Ford Foundation offered its hand.

Some scholars note that Irving's life offers a study in artistic morality although the "message" of any particular ethical exchange (Workshop v. State Department, Workshop v. Ford, v. Lincoln Center, v. ACT?) may remain unclear. A secular Jew, Irving was honored with the Methodist-oriented Danforth Fellowship early in his professorial career for interests and achievements in "religion and higher education".

In 1957, Irving began interacting with the Ford Foundation. At that time, the Foundation's Humanities and Arts Program offered grants-in-aid to "creative and performing artists", et al and the Workshop stood to benefit. Over time Irving developed a relationship with the Foundation as a consultant who advised fledgling theaters on survival and growth throughout the nation. Of particular note is his travel to Mississippi in the early '60s to work as an advisor to the Free Southern Theater, a racially integrated troupe presenting Waiting for Godot amid a "belligerent, racist" atmosphere. Irving's relationship with the Ford Foundation offered important lessons in the ethics and effects of philanthropic intervention in non-profit enterprises within a free market system.

== Lincoln Center, 1965–1972 ==
The Workshop and its directors rose in national prominence for thirteen years until, in 1965, Irving and Blau were appointed to the artistic leadership at the Repertory Company in the Vivian Beaumont Theater of Lincoln Center. Several key actors were invited to accompany them to New York to form the nucleus of a repertory troupe. The direction of the Actor's Workshop was assumed by Kenneth Kitch and John Hancock, who managed to keep the company going, despite dwindling audiences, through the summer of 1966 when the San Francisco Chamber of Commerce rejected an appeal for aid from the company. The Chamber instead offered a financial incentive to William Ball's American Conservatory Theater to become the city's resident company.

Irving and Blau were back in their home city. After a rocky reception to their initial efforts, particularly to Blau's production of Danton's Death, Blau resigned, but Irving was retained by the Lincoln Center board. He steadily built the repertory company for the next seven years, concentrating mainly on his responsibilities and leadership as producer after personally directing some of the strongest early productions, including the powerful 1966 Caucasian Chalk Circle.

While nurturing the acting and directing corps, he embraced at times certain "star" productions of quality, such as Mike Nichols' celebrated revival of Lillian Hellman's The Little Foxes and Gordon Davidson's staging of In the Matter of J. Robert Oppenheimer. Irving understood that in New York no cultural institution may function well in isolation, so he reached out even to commercial productions of poetic and idealistic themes, e.g., Brian Friel's Lovers. He ended his regime at Lincoln Center in 1972 with Ellis Rabb's widely celebrated direction of Maxim Gorky's Enemies with a cast that included several actors who had come with Irving years earlier from San Francisco.

== Retirement, 1972–1979 ==
Irving concluded a little over three decades in live theater when he left Lincoln Center. He and his family moved to Southern California, where Ms. Pointer, long a major actress with the Actor's Workshop and Lincoln Center, found opportunity in film roles, and where their daughter Amy Irving, who began her acting career at age nine on the Workshop stage, would carry on the family name. Irving produced television revivals of classic films, including Dark Victory, and directed Loose Change and the series, Rich Man, Poor Man. As producer of the Lincoln Center original, he is credited for Masterpiece Theater's televised version of Enemies.

== Personal life and death ==
In 1947, Irving married actress Priscilla Pointer, to whom he remained married until his death in 1979. The couple had three children, including director David Irving and actress Amy Irving. Pointer remarried a year later in 1980 to Robert Symonds, who had been Irving's producing partner at Lincoln Center.

He died of a heart attack in 1979 on a vacation trip to Reno, Nevada, aged 54.
