= Angel with a Gun =

1992 action film

- Directed by: Damiano Damiani
- Screenplay by: Carla Giulia Casalini; Damiano Damiani; Dardano Sacchetti
- Produced by: Mario Cecchi Gori; Vittorio Cecchi Gori
- Starring: Remo Girone; Tahnee Welch
- Cinematography: Sebastiano Celeste
- Edited by: Antonio Siciliano
- Music by: Riz Ortolani
- Release date: 1992
- Country: Italy
- Language: Italian

Angel with a Gun (Italian: L'angelo con la pistola) is a 1992 action drama film co-written and directed by Damiano Damiani and starring Remo Girone and Tahnee Welch.

== Cast ==
- Remo Girone as Police Commissioner Cattani
- Tahnee Welch as Lisa
- Eva Grimaldi as Teresa
- Nicola D'Eramo as Basek
- Francesco Sciacca as Ruiz
- Sergio Fiorentini as Astarita
- Antonino Iuorio as Pascal
- Mario Donatone as Velasco
- Cesare Bocci
