= Dona Flor and Her Two Husbands =

1976 film directed by Bruno Barreto

- Film poster by Benício
- Directed by: Bruno Barreto
- Written by: Bruno Barreto; Eduardo Coutinho; Leopoldo Serran
- Based on: Dona Flor e Seus Dois Maridos by Jorge Amado
- Produced by: Luiz Carlos Barreto; Newton Rique
- Starring: Sônia Braga; José Wilker; Mauro Mendonça
- Cinematography: Murilo Salles
- Edited by: Raimundo Higino
- Music by: Chico Buarque; Francis Hime
- Distributed by: Embrafilme
- Release date: November 22, 1976 (Brazil)
- Running time: 110 minutes
- Country: Brazil
- Language: Portuguese
- Box office: 10.73 million admissions (Brazil)

Dona Flor and Her Two Husbands (Portuguese: Dona Flor e Seus Dois Maridos) is a 1976 Brazilian comedy film directed by Bruno Barreto. Based on the 1966 novel of the same name by Jorge Amado, it takes place in 1940s Bahia and has Sônia Braga, José Wilker and Mauro Mendonça in the leading roles. The screenplay was adapted by Barreto, Eduardo Coutinho and Leopoldo Serran.

When initially released, Dona Flor became the most successful film in Brazilian history. Internationally, the film received nominations for a Golden Globe and a BAFTA Award.

In 1982, an American remake titled Kiss Me Goodbye starred Sally Field, James Caan, and Jeff Bridges in the leading roles. A 2017 remake starred Juliana Paes, Leandro Hassum and Marcelo Faria and was directed by Pedro Vasconcellos.

In 2015, the Brazilian Film Critics Association aka Abraccine voted Dona Flor and her Two Husbands the 39th greatest Brazilian film of all time, in its list of the 100 best Brazilian films.

== Plot ==
Vadinho, Flor's irresponsible husband, drops dead while dancing in a street carnival party. Only Flor expresses remorse after his death. Flor's friends and family see Vadinho's death as a chance for Flor to find happiness after the misery brought upon her by Vadinho's spendthrift ways and near-total lack of respectability.

Roughly the first half of Dona Flor recounts Flor's marriage with Vadinho in an extended flashback. What is made clear is that Vadinho was a great lover who admired his wife's respectability, but enjoyed protracted foreplay until she begged him to continue. Not only was he generally an inattentive husband who would rather go to the casinos and whore houses, but he beat Flor and stole the savings she made from her cooking school. Despite this, his seductiveness changed a formerly inhibited girl into a wife who experienced carnal joy regularly.

The second half of Dona Flor involves Flor's meeting the respectable but dull pharmacist Teodoro, his courtship of her, and her marriage to him. Flor's friends consider Teodoro the exact opposite of Vadinho. Teodoro belongs in superior circles within Bahia's society, dresses elegantly, and treats Flor like a lady. What Flor's friends do not know is that Teodoro is also the opposite of Vadinho in one more respect: in bed, Teodoro is as lacking as Vadinho was accomplished. Flor finds herself unfulfilled, and wishes for her late husband to return.

On the anniversary of Vadinho's death, Vadinho reappears to Flor in the nude and explains that she called him to "share her bed" with him. Only Flor can see and hear the nude spirit of Vadinho, but he still manages to create chaos through his spiritual presence at casinos. She protests because she is now remarried and has pledged to be faithful to Teodoro, but after Vadinho laughs during Teodoro's pathetic attempts at love-making that night, Flor gives in and lives happily with both husbands. The last two shots depict Flor in her new marital bliss. A shot toward the end of the film shows Teodoro lying in bed next to Flor, who kisses him on the cheek. The camera then pans to the left to show Vadinho on Flor's other side and she kisses him on the cheek too. Then (presumably the next day) as a large crowd exits Sunday Mass, we see Flor linking arms with both Teodoro and Vadinho, the latter completely in the nude without shame. Flor is seen to be very content.

== Production ==
Director Bruno Barreto said that in the sex scenes José Wilker was really uncomfortable, while Sonia Braga was at ease. "Actually as soon as I said 'cut,' an A.D. would cover her with a robe, and she would say, 'No, no, no, if you don't mind I want to stay naked, so I get used to it.' So she was very casual about it, very relaxed about it," Barreto recalled.

== Reception ==
The film was the most popular Brazilian film of all-time with 10.73 million admissions and was not surpassed until Elite Squad: The Enemy Within in 2010. It grossed $2 million in its first five weeks of release in 15 theatres in Rio de Janeiro and São Paulo. It was the second most popular film in Brazil after Jaws, which had 13 million admissions. By 1998, it became the third most successful film, with only Jaws and Titanic, with 16 million admissions, ahead of it.

In the United States, it was the highest-grossing Brazilian film with a gross of $3 million until the 1998 release of Central Station which grossed $6 million.

Dona Flor and Her Two Husbands holds a 78% rating on Rotten Tomatoes based on nine reviews.

== Awards and nominations ==
BAFTA Film Awards

- Best Leading Newcomer – Sônia Braga (nominated)

Golden Globe Awards

- Best Foreign Language Film (nominated)

Gramado Film Festival

- Best Film – Bruno Barreto (nominated)
- Best Director – Bruno Barreto (won)
- Best Film Music – Francis Hime (won)
- Special Jury Award – Anisio Medeiros, production designer (won)
