= The Great Texas Dynamite Chase =

1976 American crime comedy film

- Theatrical release poster
- Directed by: Michael Pressman
- Screenplay by: David Kirkpatrick
- Story by: Mark Rosin
- Produced by: David Irving
- Starring: Claudia Jennings; Jocelyn Jones; Johnny Crawford
- Cinematography: Jamie Anderson
- Edited by: Millie Moore
- Music by: Craig Safan
- Production company: Yasny Talking Pictures II
- Distributed by: New World Pictures
- Release date: August 18, 1976
- Running time: 90 minutes
- Country: United States
- Language: English
- Budget: $200,000

The Great Texas Dynamite Chase (also known as Dynamite Women) is a 1976 American crime comedy film directed by Michael Pressman in his directorial debut.

== Plot ==
Busting out of prison, Candy Morgan gets out of her jumpsuit and robs a small Texas bank, with lighted sticks of dynamite. She is assisted by bank teller Ellie-Jo Turner, who has just been fired for persistent lateness and "total lack of character." Later, Candy picks up Ellie-Jo hitchhiking. The two tightly outfitted women decide to team-up and become a modern-day "Bonnie and Clyde". They meet Slim robbing a convenience store, and take him hostage. Knowing good gigs when he sees them, he makes the dynamite duo a threesome.

== Cast ==
- Claudia Jennings as Candy Morgan
- Jocelyn Jones as Ellie-Jo Turner
- Johnny Crawford as Slim
- Christopher Pennock as Jake
- Tara Strohmeier as Pam Morgan
- Tom Rosqui as Jason Morgan
- Priscilla Pointer as Miss Harris
- Miles Watkins as Boyfriend
- Nancy Bleier as Carol
- Buddy Kling as Mr. Sherman
- Oliver Clark as Officer Andy
- Ed Steef as Todd
- Danny Sullivan as Young Texan
- Bart Braverman as Freddie
- Peggy Brenner as Bank Teller
- Jim Boles as Mr. Ralston

== Production ==
Producer David Irving and director Michael Pressmen succeeded in getting a distribution guarantee from Roger Corman at New World Pictures which helped them raise the $200,000 budget. "He wanted a R rated film with lots of sex and violence so we had to go along with that," said Irving.

Filming took place in 1976. At one stage the title was Dynamite Women.

Director Michael Pressman recalled Jennings "was a favorite of Roger Corman’s". He said she was “a very complicated lady, [who] appeared to be in a lot of emotional turmoil... she was going through a lot personally but, basically, she was up for the fun of making a movie.”

Jennings was injured while filming a minor stunt and the movie had to be shut down for two weeks. She relied on painkillers to get through the rest of the film.

The director, producer and writer all knew each other from Cal Arts in Valencia. Pressman said the film "is not me. Perhaps the angle, bent and humour is but I want to make more personal films. I’m semi-uncomfortable with the violence in my film. It’s a mistake but I did it out of insecurity, to touch all the bases... Hollywood is a tough place that’s going through a strong exploitation trend and I needed to get into the arena."

== Reception ==
Roger Corman later recalled the film "was quite successful, again because the action was treated with humor... Both leading ladies were good, and the film was well made of its type."

Variety called it "a good example of a well-made exploitation film which works on two levels, providing kicks for the ozoner crowd and tongue-in-cheek humor for the more sophisticated."

Vincent Canby of The New York Times wrote, "Like every other low-budget, regional melodrama of this kind, the movie is virtually constructed of automobile chases in which every shot of the lead car turning a corner, hitting a bump or swerving to avoid a truck must be repeated by a shot of the pursuing car dealing with the same set of circumstances."

Linda Gross of the Los Angeles Times stated, "Producer David Irving makes an auspicious first feature debut in this stylish and enjoyable fantasy about friendship among thieves."

Danny Peary wrote the film "is surprisingly disappointing. One of the countless low-budgeted cops-chaseheroes/heroines-on-dusty-southern-backroads pictures that have been made since Thunder Road (1958) and the peak drive-in era, it lacks the excitement, humor, and even the sweaty rednecks that can be found in most films of the genre. Worse, Jennings gives an uncharacteristically lackluster performance."

== Notes ==
- Bass, Ari (July 2000). "Claudia Jennings Lost Highway". Femme Fetale. Vol. 9, no. 2. pp. 40–55.
