= Leopoldo Serran =

Leopoldo Augusto Bhering Serran (6 May 1942 – 20 August 2008) was a Brazilian screenwriter best known for the 1976 film Dona Flor and Her Two Husbands, based on the novel by Jorge Amado.

Serran frequently collaborated with directors Carlos Diegues and Bruno Barreto, and was considered a major screenwriter of Brazil's Cinema Novo movement.

Serran died in Rio de Janeiro of liver cancer.
