= Sleeping Beauty (1987 film) =

- Film Poster
- Directed by: David Irving
- Written by: Michael Berz
- Based on: Sleeping Beauty by Brothers Grimm; Charles Perrault
- Produced by: Yoram Globus; Menahem Golan
- Starring: Morgan Fairchild; Tahnee Welch; Nicholas Clay; Sylvia Miles
- Cinematography: David Gurfinkel
- Edited by: Tova Neeman
- Music by: Michael Berz Glasman
- Production company: Golan-Globus Productions
- Distributed by: The Cannon Group, Inc.
- Release date: June 12, 1987
- Running time: 90 minutes
- Country: United States
- Language: English

Sleeping Beauty (alternatively: Cannon Movie Tales: Sleeping Beauty) is a 1987 American/Israeli fantasy film, part of the 1980 film series Cannon Movie Tales. It is directed by David Irving and stars Tahnee Welch, Morgan Fairchild, Nicholas Clay and Sylvia Miles. It is a contemporary version of the classic tale of Sleeping Beauty of the Brothers Grimm and Charles Perrault. Like the other Cannon Movie Tales, the film was filmed entirely in Israel.

== Synopsis ==
A childless Queen (Morgan Fairchild) and her King (David Holliday), are given a magical potion by a kindly elf (Kenny Baker). When the beautiful Princess Rosebud is born, all the fairies in the land are invited to a christening to bestow their gifts upon the child. However, the evil Red Fairy (Sylvia Miles) is left off the guest list because there are only eight golden dinner plates and nine fairies in the kingdom. Enraged, she crashes the christening ceremony and curses the Princess on her sixteenth birthday to prick her finger on a spinning wheel's spindle and die. The wise White Fairy (Jane Wiedlin), who was tardy and therefore unable to bestow her gift, softens the curse so Rosebud will fall asleep for one hundred years and be awakened by the kiss of true love. The King, finding very little comfort in the White Fairy's promise, orders that all the spinning wheels in the kingdom will be destroyed, except for one which is hidden and seemingly forgotten, to try to save his daughter from the Red Fairy's fearsome curse.

Many years later, all the people in the kingdom are upset because their clothes have dissolved to rags due to the absence of spindles and sewing needles. The King and the Queen travel to the far reaches and bring back reams of fabrics. During their absence, the Red Fairy, who is disguised as an old woman, lures Princess Rosebud (Tahnee Welch) into a secluded old tower room and tricks her into using a spinning wheel. Rosebud pricks her finger on the spindle, and then falls into a deep sleep. The White Fairy uses her magic to put everyone in the castle to sleep and cover the castle in thick vines. One hundred years pass, and the handsome Prince Charming comes to the castle and wakes Rosebud with a kiss, breaking the enchantment. The inhabitants of the entire kingdom celebrate their awakening, and Princess Rosebud and Prince Charming are married and live happily ever after.

== Cast ==
- Morgan Fairchild as the Queen
- Tahnee Welch as the Princess Rosebud
- Nicholas Clay as the Prince Charming
- David Holliday as the King
- Jane Wiedlin as the White Fairy
- Sylvia Miles as the Red Fairy
- Kenny Baker as the Elf
- Shaike Ophir as the Elf Master

== Reception ==
Richard Scheib from Moria.co gave it two stars and wrote: "All of the Cannon Movie Tales were cheaply shot and made. Some of them occasionally emerged okay but the majority did not. Sleeping Beauty is a dreary by-the-numbers run through of the Charles Perrault fairytale. The film pads the original story out somewhat, notably with the introduction of the character of the elf played by Kenny Baker. On the other hand, when it comes to the guts of the fairytale – ie. everything that happens after Rosebud goes to sleep – the film seems indifferent and hurried. It is hard, for instance, to understand what killed all the other heroes trying to rescue the princess when all that prince Nicholas Clay’s quest consists of is brushing through some creepers."
