= Rumpelstiltskin (1987 film) =

- Film poster
- Directed by: David Irving
- Screenplay by: David Irving
- Based on: Rumpelstiltskin by the Brothers Grimm
- Produced by: Menahem Golan; Yoram Globus
- Starring: Amy Irving; Clive Revill; Priscilla Pointer; Billy Barty
- Music by: Max Robert
- Production company: The Cannon Group
- Distributed by: The Cannon Group
- Release dates: April 1987 (United States); May 1987 (Cannes)
- Running time: 84 minutes
- Countries: United States; Israel
- Language: English
- Budget: $2 million

Rumpelstiltskin is a 1987 musical fantasy film, based on the fairy tale by the Brothers Grimm. In the United States, it was the first installment of Cannon Films' Movie Tales series.

== Production and release ==
Rumpelstiltskin was part of the Cannon Movie Tales series, a US$50 million project initiated by Menahem Golan and Yoram Globus to adapt sixteen fairy tales into live action. The film featured Billy Barty in his only lead role (as the title character), and also starred Amy Irving (as Katie, the miller's daughter) and Clive Revill as the villainous King Mezzer. Amy Irving's brother, David Irving (not the British author of the same name), scripted and directed; their mother, actress Priscilla Pointer, portrayed the Queen.

Cannon Films screened Rumpelstiltskin as the opening night attraction of its "family film festival" at 1987's Cannes Film Festival. It was the first Cannon Movie Tale released in the U.S.; though originally scheduled for November 21, 1986, it premiered in April 1987. The film was not well-received critically; Richard Harrington of The Washington Post said, "[A]ll Cannon has done...is to make a short story long. And long and longer." In his Movie Guide, Leonard Maltin gave it two stars out of four and commented, "[This] threadbare musical adaptation...[is] likely to bore even the small fry."

MGM released Rumpelstiltskin on DVD in 2005.
