= One Tough Cop =

- DVD cover
- Directed by: Bruno Barreto
- Screenplay by: Jeremy Iacone
- Based on: One Tough Cop: The Bo Dietl Story by Bo Dietl and Ken Gross
- Produced by: Michael Bregman; Martin Bregman
- Starring: Stephen Baldwin; Chris Penn; Gina Gershon; Mike McGlone; Paul Guilfoyle
- Cinematography: Ron Fortunato
- Edited by: Ray Hubley
- Music by: Bruce Broughton
- Distributed by: Stratosphere Entertainment
- Release date: October 9, 1998 (United States)
- Running time: 90 minutes
- Country: United States
- Language: English
- Box office: $1,223,034 (domestic)

One Tough Cop is a 1998 American action crime film. It was directed by Bruno Barreto and written by Jeremy Iacone. The movie stars Stephen Baldwin as the protagonist and first-person narrator Bo Dietl, a real-life New York City detective who wrote the book that the film is based on. Chris Penn costars as Dietl's partner. Gina Gershon, Mike McGlone and Paul Guilfoyle also play key roles.

== Plot summary ==
Detective Bo Dietl and his partner investigate the rape and murder of a nun. Meanwhile, Dietl learns that his partner has a gambling problem, and is in debt to loan sharks.

== Cast ==
- Stephen Baldwin as Detective Bo Dietl
- Chris Penn as Duke Finnerly
- Gina Gershon as Joey O'Hara
- Mike McGlone as Richie La Cassa
- Luis Guzmán as "Papi", Gunman
- Harvey Atkin as Rudy
- Paul Guilfoyle as Frankie "Hot" Salvino
- Victor Slezak as FBI Agent Burt Payne
- Amy Irving as FBI Agent Jean Devlin
- Jason Blicker as Philly Nose
- Bo Dietl as Detective Benny Levine
- Frank Pellegrino as Lieutenant Frank Raggio
- Michael Rispoli as Lieutenant Denny Reagan
- Paul Calderón as Sergeant Diaz
- Jean Paul as Juano
- Larry Gilliard Jr. as Curtis Wilkins
- Philip Akin as Inspector Cheney
- Karen Robinson as Sherene
- Nigel Bennett as Inspector Bassie

== Reception ==
One Tough Cop was poorly received by critics. On Rotten Tomatoes, the film holds a rating of 24% from 21 reviews with the consensus: "An aimless vanity piece starring a miscast Stephen Baldwin, this limp thriller tries too hard to portray the real-life Bo Dietl as One Tough Cop for him to be a believable one, too."
