= Herbert Blau =

American director and theoretician of performance (1926–2013)

- Herbert Blau, 2002
- Born: 3 May 1926; Brooklyn, New York
- Died: 3 May 2013 (aged 87); Seattle, Washington
- Education: B.Ch.E., New York University (Chemical Engineering), 1947; M.A., Stanford University (Drama), 1949; Ph.D., Stanford University (English & American Literature), 1954
- Spouse: Beatrice Manley (1949-1980; divorced)
- Children: 3
- Writing career
- Notable works: The Impossible Theater, a Manifesto (1964) / Take Up the Bodies: Theater at the Vanishing Point (1982) / Blooded Thought: Occasions of Theatre (1982) / The Eye of Prey: Subversions of the Postmodern (1987) / The Audience (1990) / To All Appearances: Ideology and Performance (1992) / Nothing in Itself: Complexions of Fashion (1999) / Sails of the Herring Fleet: Essays on Beckett (2000) / The Dubious Spectacle: Extremities of Theater, 1976-2000 (2002)

Herbert Blau (May 3, 1926 – May 3, 2013) was an American director and theoretician of performance. He was named the Byron W. and Alice L. Lockwood Professor in the Humanities at the University of Washington.

== Early life and career ==
Blau earned his bachelor's degree in chemical engineering from New York University (1947). Later, he earned his master of arts in drama (1949) and doctorate in English and American literature (1954), both from Stanford University.

As co-founder (with Jules Irving) of The Actor's Workshop in San Francisco (1952–1965) and co-director of the Repertory Theater of Lincoln Center in New York City (1965–67), Blau introduced American audiences to avant garde drama in some of the country's first productions of Samuel Beckett, Jean Genet, and Harold Pinter including the 1957 performance of Beckett's Waiting for Godot at California's San Quentin State Prison. This was the Godot that during the second red scare, after extralegal State Department maneuvers denied travel permission for unstated political reasons to a member of the company, represented American theater at the 1958 Brussels World's Fair.

In 1968, Blau signed the "Writers and Editors War Tax Protest" pledge, vowing to refuse tax payments in protest against the Vietnam War.

In 1968, Blau was named founding provost and dean of the school of theatre and dance of the California Institute of the Arts (CalArts), where he led the way in designing its educational model. With president Robert W. Corrigan, Blau recruited faculty including artists Allan Kaprow, John Baldessari, and Nam June Paik, composers Mel Powell and Morton Subotnick, musician Ravi Shankar, ethnomusicologist Nicholas England, designers Peter de Bretteville and Sheila Levrant de Bretteville, choreographer Bella Lewitzky, director Alexander Mackendrick, film scholar Gene Youngblood, filmmaker Pat O'Neill, and animation artist Jules Engel.

In 1971, after three years at CalArts, Blau moved to Oberlin College, where he formed the experimental theater group KRAKEN, with which he continued presenting challenging productions for another decade. The two books that emerged from that work—Take Up the Bodies: Theater at the Vanishing Point (University of Illinois Press, 1982) and Blooded Thought: Occasions of Theater (Performing Arts Journal Publications, 1982)—received the George Jean Nathan Award for Dramatic Criticism.

In 1974, Blau became the dean of the division of arts and humanities at the University of Maryland Baltimore County (UMBC), bringing KRAKEN with him. While there, he saw a young Kathleen Turner perform and persuaded her to transfer to UMBC. After a contentious tenure, Blau resigned in 1976.

CalArts conferred an honorary doctor of arts degree to Blau in May 2008.

Blau's archive is part of the performing arts collections held by the Harry Ransom Center in Austin, Texas. His papers include journals, production casebooks, scripts, correspondence, manuscripts, photographs, publicity material, and more.

== Personal life ==
Blau was born in Brooklyn. He married actress Beatrice Manley in 1949 and they divorced in 1980. They had three children: film professor Dick Blau, Tara Gwyneth Blau, and Dr. Jonathan Blau. Blau married a second time to Kathleen Woodward and they had one daughter, Jessamyn Blau.

=== Death ===
Blau died on his 87th birthday, May 3, 2013, in Seattle, Washington, from cancer. He is survived by his wife, Kathleen Woodward, three children from his first marriage, a daughter from his second marriage, seven grandchildren, and three great-grandchildren.

== Books ==
- Blau, Herbert. Programming Theater History: The Actor's Workshop of San Francisco. New York: Routledge, 2013. ISBN 9780415516709 (paperback) ISBN 9780415516693 (hardcover)
- Blau, Herbert. As If: An Autobiography, Volume 1. Ann Arbor: University of Michigan Press, 2011. ISBN 9780472117789 (hardcover) ISBN 9780472035144 (paperback) ISBN 9780472027552 (ebook)
- Blau, Herbert. Reality Principles: From the Absurd to the Virtual. Ann Arbor: University of Michigan Press, 2011. ISBN 9780472051519 (paperback) ISBN 9780472071517 (hardcover) ISBN 9780472027903 (ebook)
- Blau, Herbert. The Dubious Spectacle: Extremities of Theater, 1976-2000. Minneapolis: University of Minnesota Press, 2002. ISBN 9780816638130 (paperback) ISBN 9780816638123 (hardcover)
- Blau, Herbert. Sails of the Herring Fleet: Essays on Beckett. Ann Arbor: University of Michigan Press, 2000. ISBN 9780472030019 (paperback) ISBN 9780472111497 (hardcover) ISBN 9780472024407 (ebook)
- Blau, Herbert. Nothing in Itself: Complexions of Fashion. Bloomington: Indiana University Press, 1999. ISBN 9780253213334 (paperback) ISBN 9780253335876 (hardcover)
- Blau, Herbert. To All Appearances: Ideology and Performance. London/New York: Routledge,1992. ISBN 9780415013659 (paperback) ISBN 9780415013642 (hardcover)
- Blau, Herbert. The Audience. Baltimore: Johns Hopkins University Press, 1990. ISBN 9780801838453 (paperback) ISBN 9780801838446 (hardcover)
- Blau, Herbert. The Eye of Prey: Subversions of the Postmodern. Bloomington: Indiana University Press, 1987. ISBN 9780253204394
- Blau, Herbert. Take Up the Bodies: Theater at the Vanishing Point. Urbana: University of Illinois Press, 1982. ISBN 9780252009457 (paperback) ISBN 9780252009457 (hardcover)
- Blau, Herbert. Blooded Thought: Occasions of Theater. New York: Performing Arts Journal Publications, 1982. ISBN 9780933826397
- Blau, Herbert. The Impossible Theater: A Manifesto. New York: Macmillan, 1964; rpt. Collier, 1965. ISBN 9789990906080
