= Tahnee Welch =

American actress (born 1961)

- Born: Latanne Rene Welch; December 26, 1961 (age 64); San Diego, California, U.S.
- Occupations: Model; actress
- Years active: 1983–1999
- Mother: Raquel Welch

- Tahnee Welch, at The Hollywood Show, July 28, 2018, at the Westin Hotel LAX.

Latanne Rene "Tahnee" Welch (born December 26, 1961) is an American former model and actress and is the daughter of the actress Raquel Welch.

== Biography ==
Welch was born in San Diego, California, the daughter of actress Raquel Welch and her first husband, James Welch. Welch is of maternal English descent tracing back to the Mayflower and Spanish descent through her Bolivian maternal grandfather.

== Career ==
Welch's film career began in Italy starring opposite Virna Lisi. She starred in Ron Howard's Cocoon and its sequel, Cocoon: The Return, in which she portrayed an alien. She played the part of Princess Rosebud in the Golan Globus adaptation of Sleeping Beauty. Returning to Europe, Welch worked mostly in Italian and German film and television productions. She appeared in American independent films I Shot Andy Warhol, Sue, and Search and Destroy. She portrayed the role of Catherine Powell in the 1996 video game Ripper.

Welch posed on the cover and a nude pictorial in the November 1995 edition of Playboy. Welch appeared in American Vogue, Italian Vogue, British GQ, Interview, French Marie Claire, Italian Moda, and German Bunte magazines.

== Filmography ==
- Amarsi un po'... (1984)
- Cocoon (1985)
- Sleeping Beauty (1987)
- Lethal Obsession (1987)
- Falcon Crest (1987–1988, 4 episodes)
- Cocoon: The Return (1988)
- Disperatamente Giulia (1989)
- La bocca (1990)
- L'angelo con la pistola (Angel with a Gun) (1992)
- The Criminal Mind (1993)
- Night Train to Venice (1993)
- Improper Conduct (1994)
- Search and Destroy (1995)
- I Shot Andy Warhol (1996)
- Ripper (1996, interactive movie)
- Johnny 2.0 (1997)
- Sue (1997)
- Black Light (1999)
- Body and Soul (1999)
