= Mandroid (film) =

- VHS cover art
- Directed by: Jack Ersgard
- Written by: Earl Kenton; Jackson Barr
- Produced by: Charles Band; Oana Paunescu; Vlad Paunescu; Lara Porzak
- Starring: Robert Symonds; Curt Lowens
- Cinematography: Vlad Paunescu
- Edited by: Mark Manos; Barry Zetlin
- Music by: David Arkenstone
- Production company: Full Moon Productions
- Distributed by: Paramount Home Video
- Release date: 1993
- Running time: 81 min
- Country: United States
- Language: English

Mandroid is a 1993 film directed by Jack Ersgard starring Robert Symonds and Curt Lowens.

== Plot ==
In his hidden laboratory deep in Russia, Dr. Karl Zimmer (Symonds) has invented the Mandroid, a humanoid robot which follows the motions of a man in a special control suit. He has offered the invention to the United States, which has sent Agent Joe Smith and Dr. Wade Franklin from the CIA for inspection.

However, Zimmer's partner Drago (Lowens) has different plans and wants to sell Mandroid to the military, the night he tries to steal Mandroid, he becomes exposed to the highly toxic Superconn and is terribly disfigured. However, during the struggle, Zimmer's assistant Ben Knight also becomes exposed as he begins to turn invisible.

Drago enslaves a homeless mute and partially fixes his face, but the mute has to make him a metal mask. Using the Mandroid, Drago kidnaps Smith. Drago demands that Zimmer give him the Superconn in exchange for Smith.

Zimmer, Zana and Wade retrieve the Superconn, meanwhile Smith is revealed to be in cahoots with Drago. The chief of police arrives at the trade with a squad of police officers.

Through Mandroid, Drago reveals Smith's duplicity and fatally shoots Zimmer, then shoots Smith, as Zana mourns her father, the rest of them go after Drago and the Mandroid. Mandroid kills all of the police. Smith atones by killing the mute but dies from his injuries.

Wade destroys the Mandroid, Drago shoots Wades legs crippling him. Wade causes the building to collapse on him.

Wade and Zana start a relationship. Drago is revealed to be alive.

== Cast ==
- Brian Cousins as Wade
- Jane Caldwell as Zanna
- Michael Della Femina as Benjamin
- Robert Symonds as Karl Zimmer
- Curt Lowens as Drago
- Patrik Ersgård as Joe
- Ion Haiduc as The Mute
- Mircea Albulescu as Doctor
- Costel Constantin as Chief of Police
- Adrian Pintea as Killer
- Radu Minculescu as Policeman
- Jake McKinnon as Mandroid (uncredited)

== Production ==
The project originally was to be called "Mindmaster". Some early concept art was done by Jack Kirby.

== Reception ==
Dennis Schwartz gave the film a grade C+ and wrote: "The film disappoints because the story is slight, the acting is wooden, the cheap special effects are not special and there's no pay-off."

== Sequel ==
A sequel, entitled Invisible: The Chronicles of Benjamin Knight followed the same year.
