= David Irving (director) =

American film director (born 1949)

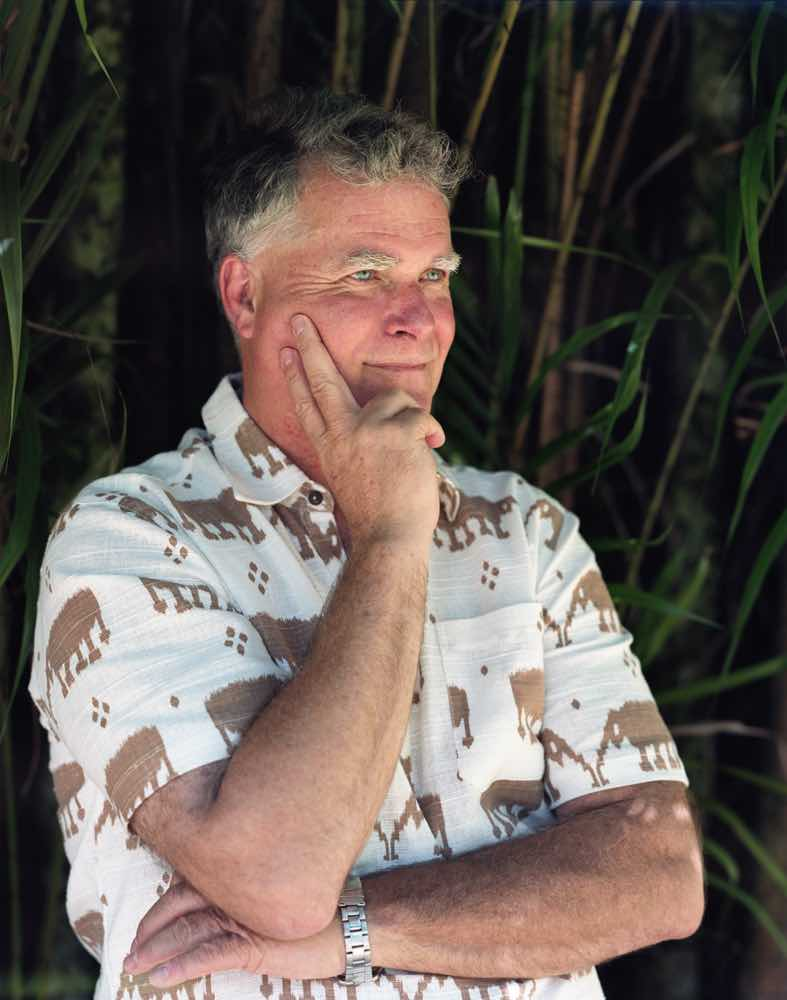
- Born: David Kenneth Irving; September 25, 1949 (age 77); Santa Clara County, California, U.S.
- Education: Riverdale School for Boys; Denison University (BFA); California Institute of the Arts (MFA)
- Occupations: Film director; screenwriter; author; professor
- Spouse: Susan Burkhalter (m. 1974)
- Children: Austin Irving
- Parent(s): Jules Irving; Priscilla Pointer
- Relatives: Amy Irving (sister)
- Writing career
- Years active: 1976–present

David Kenneth Irving (born September 25, 1949) is an American film director, screenwriter, author, and professor. His accolades include the 1981 Writers Guild of America Award for Television: Children's Script.

== Early life ==
Irving was born in Santa Clara County, California. He is the son of Jules Irving and Priscilla Pointer. His father is of Russian-Jewish descent. He has two siblings, actress Amy Irving and Katie Irving. He spent his childhood in San Francisco, where he was active in local theater. The family then relocated to New York City. Irving attended high school at Riverdale School for Boys. He earned a BFA from Denison University and an MFA from California Institute of the Arts.

== Career ==
Irving began his career as a screenwriter, director and producer of movies. He also directed numerous theatrical plays. He then moved on to writing and directing documentary shorts. He co-wrote the textbook Producing and Directing the Short Film and Video along with Peter W. Rea. The book is the only text on short film creation to focus on the importance of symbiosis between producer and director. It was originally released in 1995, and is in its 5th edition as of 2019. In 2008, it was announced that he would serve as head of NYU's Tisch Asia graduate film department.

In 2010, Irving wrote another textbook entitled Fundamentals of Film Directing. In 2011, he published another textbook entitled Elements of College Teaching. He served as the chair of the New York University Tisch School of the Arts Film and Television program for both the undergraduate and graduate schools for over seven years. He then wrote a novel, Sleep 101: The Odd Rise of Doctor Louise Pond, PhD, which explores the inner workings of academia. This was followed up with Sleep 201: The Further Adventures of Dr. Louise Pond and Sleep 301: Dr. Louise Pond and the Spunky Monkey.

As of 2019, Irving works as an associate professor at NYU's Tisch School of the Arts. In 2007, he received the NYU David Payne Carter Award for Teaching Excellence.

== Personal life ==
In 1974, Irving married actress Susan Burkhalter. They have one daughter, artist Austin Irving.

== Filmography ==
| Year | Title | Director | Writer | Producer | Notes |
|---|---|---|---|---|---|
| 1976 | The Great Texas Dynamite Chase | No | No | Yes | |
| 1980 | The Magical World of Disney (TV Series) | No | Yes - 1 episode | No | Episode: The Secret of the Lost Valley: Pt 1 |
| 1983 | Good-bye, Cruel World | Yes | No | No | |
| 1987 | Rumpelstiltsken | Yes | Yes | No | |
| 1987 | The Emperor's New Clothes | Yes | Yes | No | |
| 1988 | Sleeping Beauty | Yes | No | No | |
| 1989 | C.H.U.D. II: Bud The Chud | Yes | No | No | |
| 1990 | Night of the Cyclone | Yes | No | No | |
| 1995 | Romare Bearden | Yes | Yes | No | |
| 1998 | African Art | Yes | Yes | No | |
| 1999 | Elizabeth Catlett: Sculpting the Truth | Yes | Yes | No | documentary short |
| 2000 | Richard Mayhew: Spiritual Landscapes | Yes | Yes | No | documentary short |
| 2001 | Jacob Lawrence | Yes | Yes | No | |
| 2002 | School's Out: Self-taught Artists | Yes | Yes | No | documentary short |
| 2004 | Chuck Close: Close Up | Yes | Yes | No | documentary short |
| 2006 | I Can Fly: Kids and Creativity | Yes | Yes | No | documentary short |
| 2008 | Red Grooms: Sculptopictoramatist | Yes | Yes | No | documentary short |
| 2009 | Jimmy and Max Ernst | Yes | Yes | No | |
