= Nancy Honey =

American photographer (born 1948)

Nancy Honey (born 1948) is a UK-based American documentary and portrait photographer. Her work focuses on the lives of women, autobiographical, collaborative and documentary. She has been photographing for more than 40 years and has studied fine art, graphic design and photography in the United States and the United Kingdom. She has received many awards and commissions for her widely publicised work. Fourteen of her photographic portraits, including those of Lynne Franks, Deborah Moggach, and Margaret Hodge MP are within the collection of the National Portrait Gallery in London.

She was a Fellow of Photography at the National Museum of Photography, Film and Television in 1991-1992. Her pictures are in international public and private collections.

She has made many personal projects and her commercial work includes editorial, corporate, advertising and private commissions. Her major projects are Us (1985–1987), Woman to Woman (1987–1990), Apple of my Eye (1991), City Bus (1992), Entering the Masquerade (1991–1992) published by the National Museum of Photography, Film and TV (1992), Old Enough to Know Better (1994), Hair Salon (2002), Mad Tea (2004), Café London (2003) and Poodle Parlour (2003) published by Nazraeli Press (2008).

Her most recent project is a book and exhibition project entitled 100 Leading Ladies (2011–2014) which was launched and exhibited at Somerset House in London in 2014 and toured Britain for two years. The project, which features images of women aged over 55 who have been influential in their field, includes portraits of artist Maggi Hambling, broadcaster Kirsty Wark, author Germaine Greer and politician Shirley Williams.
