= Lighthouse: The Dark Being =

1996 video game

- Developer(s): Sierra On-Line
- Publisher(s): Sierra On-Line
- Producer(s): Oliver Brelsford
- Designer(s): Jon Bock
- Programmer(s): Sean Mooney
- Artist(s): Jon Bock
- Writer(s): Jon Bock; Susan Frischer
- Composer(s): Victor Crews; Brian Min
- Platform(s): MS-DOS, Windows, Mac OS
- Release: September 20, 1996
- Genre(s): Adventure
- Mode(s): Single-player

Lighthouse: The Dark Being is an adventure game developed and published by Sierra On-Line. It was the first and only game designed by Sierra On-Line art director Jon Bock.

== Gameplay ==
The game is a first-person graphic adventure with a point-and-click interface. It is played very similarly to the popular video game Myst.

== Plot ==
The Player starts the game in their new cottage on the Oregon coast. According to the Player's diary, he or she (the character's gender is never explicitly defined) is a struggling writer who has just moved in, and recently met their eccentric next door neighbor, Dr. Jeremiah Krick, and his daughter Amanda, who live in a nearby lighthouse. Glancing out of the window, the Player sees the lighthouse struck by lightning and then begin to glow strangely. On the Player's answering machine, Dr. Krick has left a frantic message begging the player to come over to his house and watch Amanda.

Upon arriving at Dr. Krick's house, the player discovers the front door locked, darkness inside, and silence. After turning on the power and entering, the Player finds Amanda in her crib, alone. Once the Player has explored the house, a snap is heard, and Amanda begins crying. When the Player enters her room, the "Dark Being", described in Dr. Krick's journal, takes Amanda, and jumps through a portal. At this point, the Player can either follow him through or use Dr. Krick's laboratory to construct their own portal. Either way, the Player ends up on a rocky beach in a parallel world. Krick's notes on this make reference to the real physical concept of Godel's universe.

The Player must explore the parallel world and save Dr. Krick & Amanda from the Dark Being.

== Development ==
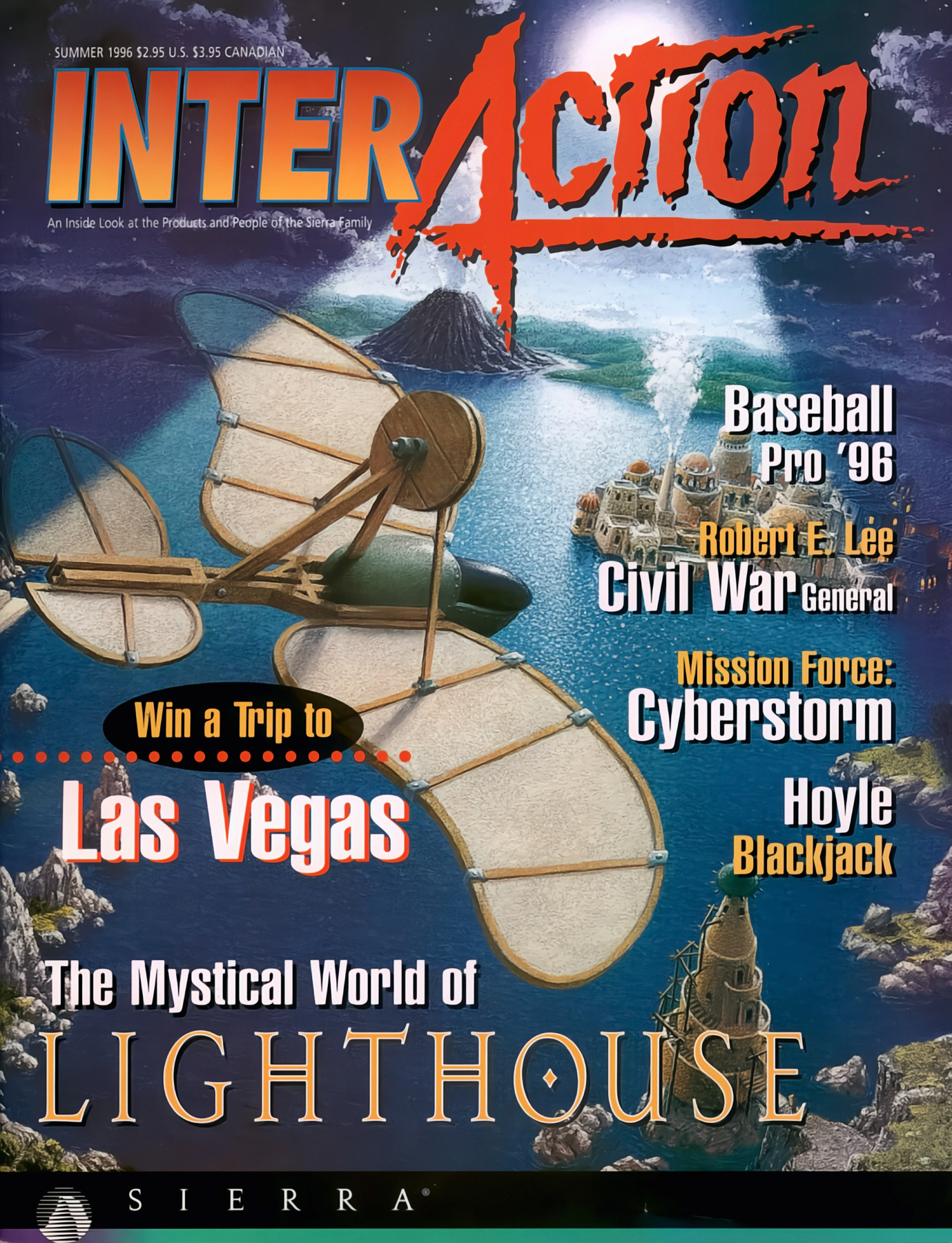
Lighthouse on the cover of the Summer 1996 edition of Interaction, a fan magazine by Sierra On-Line.

The game was conceived expressly as a "Myst clone"; lead designer Jon Bock later recalled that 'Ken Williams called me into his office one day, pulled out a copy of Myst and said; "Can you do this?" I said yes, and the game went into development.' Bock acknowledged the similarity to Myst in promotional interviews for the game, but also remarked that it has some key differences, in particular that he was working to create more character interaction and a stronger focus on story than Myst had.

== Reception ==
Reception

Review scores
Publication	Score
GameSpot	6.4/10
Next Generation	2/5 stars
PC Gamer (US)	82%
Entertainment Weekly	C−

Lighthouse received mediocre reviews, averaging a 71.29% on GameRankings based on 7 reviews. A review in Next Generation, a magazine with a very vocal stance against Myst and its imitators, commented, "Granted, just like most games of this type, the graphics are beautiful. And as much as it hurts to admit it, the story is rather intriguing, involving alternate dimensions, weird creatures, and some machines that would make Leonardo da Vinci proud. However, any sort of positive aspect of the game gets stripped away when lever, tile, and object-manipulation puzzles rear their ugly head during the course of the adventure." Rebecca Anderson of GameSpot likewise said that the graphics are beautifully detailed, but the puzzles are often vague, obscure, and even illogical, citing how the player is punished for attempting to rescue the baby in their charge when he is kidnapped.

Entertainment Weekly derided the control scheme, voice acting, and plot, which they characterized as "a talentless rip-off of a Stephen King novel", and concluded the game to be almost a total loss.
