= Carried Away (1996 film) =

- Theatrical release poster
- Directed by: Bruno Barreto
- Screenplay by: Ed Jones
- Based on: Farmer by Jim Harrison
- Produced by: Paul Hertzberg; Amy Irving
- Starring: Dennis Hopper; Amy Irving; Amy Locane; Julie Harris; Gary Busey; Hal Holbrook
- Cinematography: Declan Quinn
- Edited by: Bruce Cannon
- Music by: Bruce Broughton
- Production company: CineTel Films
- Distributed by: Fine Line Features
- Release date: March 29, 1996
- Running time: 109 minutes
- Country: United States
- Language: English
- Box office: $290,978

Carried Away (also known as Acts of Love) is a 1996 American drama film directed by Bruno Barreto. It is based on the novel Farmer by Jim Harrison.

The film stars Dennis Hopper, Amy Irving (Barreto's then wife), Gary Busey, and Amy Locane. The tagline reads "No love is safe from desire".

== Plot ==
Joseph Svenden is a middle-aged schoolteacher who lives on a farm with his dying mother. In his simple life there is no excitement, even in his long-time relationship with a widow. However, when a beautiful 17-year-old girl enrolls in his class, life takes an unexpected turn. She boards her horse in his barn, and they flirt. They carry on a furtive relationship which leaves him torn between passion and knowing that he is doing something wrong. When their relationship becomes public, many different reactions ensue.

== Cast ==
- Dennis Hopper as Joseph Svenden
- Todd Duffey as Young Joseph Svenden
- Amy Irving as Rosealee Henson
- Amy Locane as Catherine Wheeler
- Julie Harris as Joseph's Mother
- Gary Busey as Major Nathan Wheeler
- Hal Holbrook as Dr. Evans
- Christopher Pettiet as Robert Henson
- Priscilla Pointer as Lily Henson
- Gail Cronauer as Beverly
- Alissa Alban as School Board Superintendent
- E.J. Morris as School Board Woman
- Joe Stevens as School Board Man
- Connie Cooper as Charlotte
- Eleese Lester as Marie
- Doug Jackson as Frank
- Karen Churchill

== Production ==
Amy Irving revealed that her sex scene with Dennis Hopper was heavily edited.

== Reception ==
On the review aggregator website Rotten Tomatoes, 68% of 22 critics' reviews are positive, with an average rating of 6.4/10.
