= A Show of Force =

1990 film by Bruno Barreto

- DVD cover of the film
- Directed by: Bruno Barreto
- Screenplay by: Evan Jones; John Strong
- Based on: Murder Under Two Flags by Anne Nelson
- Produced by: John Strong
- Starring: Amy Irving; Andy García; Lou Diamond Phillips; Robert Duvall; Kevin Spacey
- Cinematography: James Glennon
- Edited by: Henry Richardson
- Music by: Georges Delerue
- Distributed by: Paramount Pictures
- Release date: May 11, 1990
- Running time: 93 minutes
- Countries: United States; Hong Kong
- Language: English
- Budget: $12 million
- Box office: $152,982 (USA)

A Show of Force is a 1990 thriller drama film directed by Bruno Barreto. The film is based on events and theories surrounding the Maravilla Hill case in Puerto Rico adapted from Anne Nelson's book, Murder Under Two Flags.

== Plot ==
In 1978, Kate Melendez is a television news reporter who investigates the mysterious deaths of two radical Puerto Rican activists. The government claims they were terrorists while others claim the two were merely student activists. Despite threats to her own life, Melendez investigates the deaths, gradually leading her to conclude that undercover American agents were responsible for framing the activists as terrorists, and then murdering them.

== Cast ==
Actor	Role
Amy Irving	Kate Melendez
Andy García	Luis Angel Mora
Lou Diamond Phillips	Jesus Fuentes
Robert Duvall	Howard
Kevin Spacey	Frank Curtin
Erik Estrada	Machado
Jorge Castillo	Nestor Chavez
Lupe Ontiveros	Pepita

== See also ==
- Cinema of Puerto Rico
- List of films set in Puerto Rico
