= Actor's Workshop =

The Actor's Workshop was a theatre company founded in San Francisco in 1952. It was the first professional theatre on the west coast to premiere many of the modern American classics such as Arthur Miller's Death of a Salesman and The Crucible, and the world dramas of Samuel Beckett, Bertolt Brecht, Jean Genet and Harold Pinter. For the 1953–1954 season, the Workshop offered six plays: Lysistrata, by Aristophanes; Venus Observed, by Christopher Fry; Death of a Salesman, by Arthur Miller; a revival of Playboy; The Cherry Orchard, by Anton Chekhov; and Tonight at 8.30, by Noël Coward. On April 15, 1955, the Actor's Workshop signed the first Off-Broadway Equity contract to be awarded outside New York City.

When the Actor's Workshop began in 1952, all the talk in America's progressive theatre ranks was of “decentralization," and ANTA’s "forty-theatre plan" was in its formative stage. In 1955, the Actor's Workshop became the first theatre group outside of New York City to sign an "off-Broadway" Equity agreement. A local, independent professional theatre troupe, not just another amateur "Little Theater", was envisioned by an early ensemble of two directors, Herbert Blau and Jules Irving, and a dozen unemployed Actors Equity members who adopted the name "Actor's Workshop" as a sign of their interest in polishing performance skills and honing them in group critique. From its start in a loft above a judo academy on Divisadero Street, the Workshop expanded over the years to a warehouse on Elgin Street and eventually occupied two simultaneously running houses, the Marines Memorial Theater and the Encore Theater.

The guiding artistic vision of the Workshop was a legacy of the Group Theatre of the 1930s, with the troupe's eyes firmly on social responsibility and ensemble principles. Among the company's most lauded productions were the plays of Miller, Tennessee Williams, Bertolt Brecht, John Osborne, Harold Pinter—and Shakespeare. Their 1957 production of Beckett's Waiting for Godot played before their regular audiences and later to inmates of San Quentin Prison; in 1958, Godot was chosen by the U.S. State Department to represent American theater at the Brussels World's Fair and, along the way, the company performed at New York's York Playhouse. In addition to the troupe's focus on contemporary drama, a rare assay at Shakespeare's King Lear, brought great acclaim to the company, a Lear directed by Blau with young Michael O'Sullivan in the title role, a version that amazed audiences in surreal emotionality and went on to become one of the Workshop's longest running shows.

For years, the company struggled financially but retained relative artistic autonomy which shifted in the 1959–60 season, when the Ford Foundation, through its "Program for Playwrights", began to grant aid to selected regional theaters and became, in the process, quite influential. While the Workshop directors maintained focus on serious, contemporary drama, the Ford money introduced "star" names and occasioned mismatched temperaments.

The Workshop is considered by many to have been a seminal part of the modern theater movement in America. In Regional Theatre: the Revolutionary Stage, Joseph Zeigler cites the Actor's Workshop as one of the six founding theatres of the Regional Theatre Movement. Blau and Irving, the co-founder directors, were professors at San Francisco State University. Their work rose to prominence on the American scene to such an extent that in 1965 the two were invited to initiate the Repertory Theater of Lincoln Center at the Vivian Beaumont Theater, which had just finished construction at New York's Lincoln Center. The direction of the Workshop was assumed by Kenneth Kitch and John Hancock, who managed to keep the company going through the summer of 1966. At that time, William Ball's traveling American Conservatory Theater (ACT) was seeking financial support and in residence at Stanford University, and the San Francisco Chamber of Commerce, wishing to put its weight behind the city's artistic development, visited performances at both the financially ailing Workshop and ACT, then chose to sponsor ACT as San Francisco's resident company.
