= Bruno Barreto =

Brazilian film director

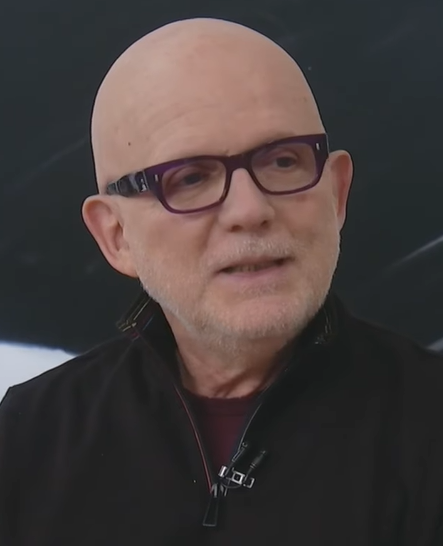
- Barreto in 2025
- Born: 16 March 1955 (age 71); Rio de Janeiro, Brazil
- Occupation: Film director
- Years active: 1967–present
- Spouse: Amy Irving (m. 1996; div. 2005)
- Children: 1
- Relatives: Fábio Barreto (brother)

Bruno Villela Barreto Borges (born 16 March 1955) is a Brazilian film director.

== Biography ==
Born in Rio de Janeiro, Barreto has been making feature-length films ever since he was 17 years old and remains one of Brazil's most accomplished and popular directors to this day. His films vary widely, from light comedies like Dona Flor and Her Two Husbands (1976) and Bossa Nova (2000) to tense political thrillers like Four Days in September (1997). Four Days in September was entered into the 47th Berlin International Film Festival. His 1973 film Tati was entered into the 8th Moscow International Film Festival.

Other films Barreto has directed films include Carried Away and View from the Top. Barreto was married to actress Amy Irving from 1996 to 2005, with whom he made Bossa Nova and Carried Away. They had one son (Gabriel) together born in 1990. He is the ex-stepfather of Max Spielberg, Irving's son by her first husband Steven Spielberg.

== Controversy ==
According to Bloomberg News, Brazilian prosecutors allege that Barreto razed protected jungle on Brazil's Pico Island to build a personal home. He was charged in 2006 for illegally clearing protected forestland. Barreto had agreed in a 2008 court proceeding to demolish said house and restore the land within two years. Yet, four years later, prosecutors claim that the house remains intact.

== Selected filmography (director) ==
- Reaching for the Moon (2013)
- Last Stop 174 (2008)
- Wicked Childhood (2006)
- Romeo and Juliet are Getting Married (2005)
- View from the Top (2003)
- Bossa Nova (2000)
- One Tough Cop (1998)
- Four Days in September (1997)
- Carried Away (1996)
- The Heart of Justice (1993)
- A Show of Force (1990)
- The Story of Fausta (1988)
- Happily Ever After (1985)
- Gabriela, Cravo e Canela (1983)
- The Asphalt Kiss (1980)
- Dona Flor and Her Two Husbands (1976)
- Tati (1973)
