= Jubiabá =

1935 novel by Jorge Amado

- First edition
- Author: Jorge Amado
- Original title: Jubiabá
- Translator: Margaret A. Neves
- Language: Portuguese
- Publisher: José Olympio Editora
- Publication date: 1935
- Publication place: Brazil
- English publication date: 1989

Jubiabá (Portuguese pronunciation: [ʒubjaˈba]) is a Brazilian modernist novel written by Jorge Amado in 1935. It earned Amado an international reputation, being hailed by Albert Camus as “a magnificent and haunting” book.

Begun in 1934 in Conceição da Feira in Bahia, when Jorge Amado was 22, Jubiabá was completed in Rio de Janeiro the following year. Some of the characters of his later works make their first appearance here, such as the sailors Guma and Master Manuel, from Sea of Death, while Tent of Miracles published in 1969, reworked various themes from Jubiabá.

== Plot ==
The novel tells the story of the friendship between a poor black youngster from Salvador de Bahia, Antonio Balduino, and a candomblé priest - Pai de Santo -, Jubiabá. After the death of his insane aunt when he was a boy, Balduino is sent to work in a rich white family. However, he has to escape when he is unjustly accused of violence towards Lindinalva, the beautiful daughter of his hosts. Balduino thenceforth spends the rest of his youth in freedom as a member of a gang of street kids, which anticipates Amado's later novel Captains of the Sands. Subsequently, he becomes a successful boxer but, depressed after his first defeat, he leaves Salvador and starts to work on a tobacco plantation, only to be forced to flee again when he almost murders a fellow worker. On his return to Salvador, he surprisingly meets Lindinalva, who, following the bankruptcy of her father, is now a prostitute. On her death bed she entrusts her son to him. Balduino is then employed as a port worker. His involvement in a general strike causes conflict with his old friend Jubiabá, who he considers insufficiently supportive of the strike.

== Themes ==
Jubiabá examines the African-Brazilian culture of the state of Bahia, with much emphasis on candomblé and macumba. It continues the theme of development of political consciousness among the working class from Amado's earlier novels Cacau and Sweat. As with these, however, the political tension tends to be diluted by the sentimental way in which the poor are described.

== Legacy ==
Jubiabá was the basis for the 1986 motion picture of the same name, Jubiabá, written and directed by Nelson Pereira dos Santos. In addition to the film, it was made into a radio soap opera in the 1940s, and there were various theatre adaptations in the 1960s and 1970s. The story also appeared in comic book format.
