= The Golden Harvest =

Novel by Brazilian writer Jorge Amado

- Early edition
- Author: Jorge Amado
- Original title: São Jorge dos Ilhéus
- Translator: Clifford E. Landers
- Language: Portuguese
- Publisher: Livraria Martins Editora
- Publication date: 1944
- Publication place: Brazil
- English publication date: 1992
- ISBN: 0380761009

The Golden Harvest (Portuguese: São Jorge dos Ilhéus) is a Brazilian Modernist novel. It was written by Jorge Amado from 1942 to 1944, published in Portuguese in 1944 and in English in 1992.

== Background ==
The Golden Harvest is one of Amado's works set in the cocoa-growing areas of the state of Bahia and concerning the society that grew up around this crop. Others are Cacau (1933), The Violent Land (1943), Gabriela, Clove and Cinnamon (1958), and Showdown (1984). It is essentially a continuation of The Violent Land but in the 1930s, when the novel is set, the cocoa economy is already showing signs of civilization, with greater respect for the law and commercial contracts. On the strength of cocoa, the town of Ilhéus in the state of Bahia has been transformed into a major city. Whilst in The Violent Land disputes were resolved with a bullet, in The Golden Harvest they are now behind closed office doors. Nevertheless, although Ilhéus is experiencing rapid urban and social reform, some of the old ways endure alongside modernization, including arduous toil, exploitation, greed and violence. The novel tells of the boom when cocoa was more valuable than gold and the subsequent bust and the effect of both boom and bust on the people of Ilheus.

== Criticism ==
The novel has been criticised for its plodding pace and predictable plot, unredeemed by abrupt shifts from narrative past to present tense. The translation, moreover, is criticised for converting rural Brazilian Portuguese into southern American English idioms with lackluster effects.
