= Bahia de Todos-os-santos (book) =

1945 guide by Jorge Amado

Bahia de Todos-os-santos: guia de ruas e mistérios de Salvador
- First edition
- Author: Jorge Amado
- Original title: Bahia de Todos-os-santos: guia de ruas e mistérios de Salvador (Bahia of all-saints: a guide to the streets and mysteries of Salvador)
- Language: Portuguese
- Publisher: Livraria Martins Editora, São Paulo, republished by Companhia das Letras, 2012.
- Publication date: 1945
- Publication place: Brazil
- Pages: 410
- ISBN: 9788535921373

Bahia de Todos-os-santos: guia de ruas e mistérios de Salvador (Bahia of all-saints: a guide to the streets and mysteries of Salvador) is a book by the Brazilian writer, Jorge Amado, first published in Portuguese in 1945. It has been translated into French and Spanish but has yet to be published in English. Originally written in 1944, at the height of the struggle against the dictatorship of President Getúlio Vargas and immediately after Amado's return after two years of exile in Argentina and Uruguay and his brief arrest, it has been successively updated. The original edition included engravings by Manuel Martins. Photographs by Flávio Damm were introduced in the 1961 edition and illustrations by the modernist artist Carlos Bastos were introduced in the 1976 edition. The version Amado considered to be definitive was published in 1986. He died in Salvador in 2001.

The book is a guide to Salvador in Brazil, known in full as São Salvador da Bahia de Todos os Santos. The original publisher described it as "a love song to the oldest and most beautiful city in Brazil, the mother of Brazilian cities." Amado states at the beginning that "This is quite a strange guide". "With it, you will not only see the beautiful yellow peel of the orange, you will also see the rotten segments that are repulsive to the palate." With an ethnographic approach, he describes both rich and poor neighbourhoods, including the architectural attractions such as the churches, palaces, urban hillsides and bays and harbours, as well as the city's beaches and lagoons. The slums, lack of sanitation, poor infrastructure, sense of helplessness and disease are also covered. Many of Amado's novels looked at the customs of the Afro-Brazilian population and their rituals, such as macumba and candomblé, and the worship of Iemanjá, and these also form an important part of Bahia de Todos-os-santos: guia de ruas e mistérios de Salvador. As a communist, his empathy for working people is reflected in his description of the daily lives of manual labourers, of recipes for Bahian foods, of capoeira, of the petty criminals that he called Captains of the Sand, and of fishermen and others who made their lives in the bay.

The book was first published in 1945, but was revised for subsequent editions to reflect the many changes to the urban environment. It is far from being a normal tourist guide, having been described as "an encyclopedia of what it means to be baiano" and a "hymn of praise to the city of Bahia". At the same time, it does not fail to discuss the chronic poverty of the city. Amado in places uses the technique of addressing an imaginary female reader found also in his two biographies, The ABC of Castro Alves and The Knight of Hope, a biography of Luís Carlos Prestes.

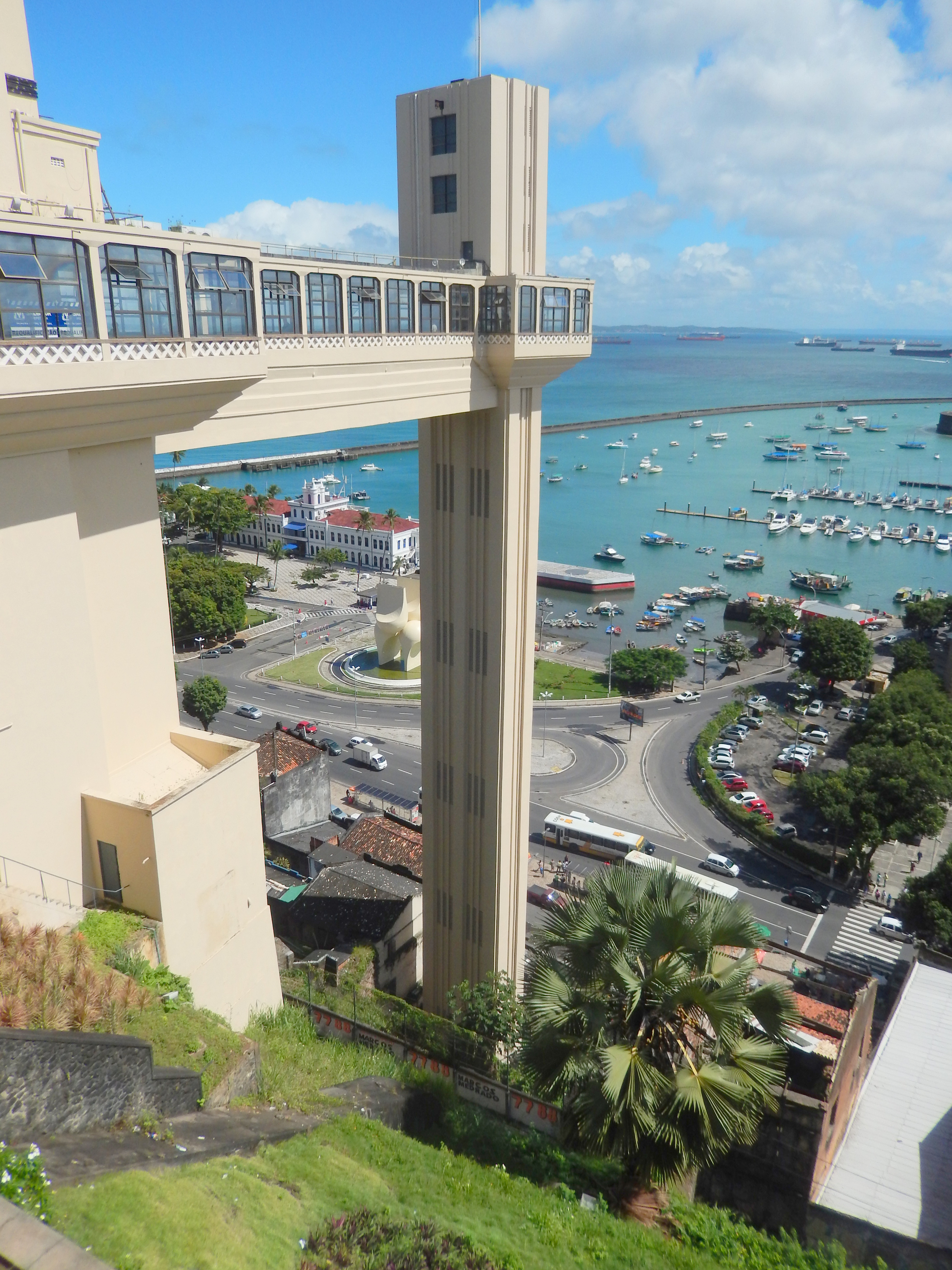
The Lacerda Elevator in Salvador, a feature of the city since 1873
