= Pen, Sword, Camisole =

1979 novel by Jorge Amado

First edition (publ. Editora Record)

Pen, Sword, Camisole (Portuguese: Farda Fardão Camisola de Dormir) is a 1978 Modernist novel by Brazilian writer Jorge Amado. It was published in English in 1985, with a translation by Helen R. Lane.

== Background ==
Pen, Sword, Camisole belongs to the second phase of Amado's writing life when he had largely abandoned the realism and social themes of his earlier works and turned towards an emphasis on female characters such as Dona Flor, Tereza Batista, and Tieta. Like other Amado novels, Pen, Sword, Camisole combines comic farce and biting satire. Unlike most of the other novels, it is set mainly in Rio de Janeiro rather than in Bahia and is a satire of academic and social pretension as well as of Brazil's "New State" (as it was called during the late 1930s and 1940s) under the fascist totalitarian regime of Getúlio Vargas.

The story concerns the attempts of the Chief of National Security of the regime to be elected as a member of the Brazilian Academy of Letters. Amado was himself elected to the academy in 1961. The relationship between politics and art is at the center of the novel. Amado subtitled it A Fable to Kindle a Hope. It is more obviously didactic than his popular novels but “bespeaks a passionate humanism”.

== Plot ==
The novel is set in Brazil in late 1940 and early 1941 at a time when Brazil had close connections to Nazi Germany. The Chief of National Security, nicknamed the Brazilian Goebbels, has the ambition to be chosen as one of the 40 member of the Brazilian Academy of Letters. The death of a great Brazilian poet creates a vacancy and the Colonel begins his campaign to be elected. Some of the members can't stand the thought of the peace-loving poet being replaced by a Nazi and form a committee to oppose him. They identify a higher-ranking army officer who is a third-rate author and persuade him to run for the vacant position. Tactics used to encourage the academy members to support their candidate include intrigue and deception as well as enlisting the help of the dead poet's former mistresses to help "persuade" some of the Academicians to vote against the Nazi (hence the reference in the title to the “camisole”). However, the plans go awry when their alternative candidate turns into an obnoxious despot even before he is elected.

== Criticism ==
Although reviews have generally agreed that Pen, Sword, Camisole is an enjoyable read, it has been criticised for being rather insubstantial in comparison with some other Amado novels. One reviewer has noted that the politicking surrounding the election to the academy is tedious at times and most characters are insufficiently developed and mere caricatures. Another considers the work a repetitious bagatelle designed to settle some scores in the Brazilian literary world, with fond tributes and acid attacks.
