= Tieta =

1977 novel by Jorge Amado

- First edition
- Author: Jorge Amado
- Original title: Tieta do agreste
- Translator: Barbara Shelby
- Language: Portuguese
- Publisher: Distribuidora Record
- Publication date: 1977
- Publication place: Brazil
- English publication date: 1979
- ISBN: 0-380-75477-0

Tieta (Portuguese: Tieta do Agreste, lit. "Tieta from Agreste") is a novel written by the Brazilian author Jorge Amado, published on August 17, 1977. Set in the 1970s, it narrates the return of Tieta to the remote village of Santana do Agreste, 26 years after being beaten and expelled by her father in front of all the town's people.

== Background ==
Written mainly in Buraquinho Beach, Lauro de Freitas, close to Salvador, Brazil, and concluded in London in mid-1977, Tieta lives up to its full title: "Tieta the Goat Girl or The Return of The Prodigal Daughter, A Melodramatic Serial Novel in Five Sensational Episodes with a Touching Epilogue: Thrills and Suspense!" The book is one of the author's longest narratives and follows the story's protagonist through three decades.

In the work of Jorge Amado, the novel falls among those books that, in novelistic tone, chronicle the times and customs, without losing sight of social and political criticism. Published during the period of Brazil's military regime, the plot anticipates issues that would become central in the life of the country, such as concern for the environment and criticism of power relations guided by favoritism and corruption. With her impetuosity and questioning spirit, Tieta joined the gallery of the author's great female characters, alongside Gabriela, Dona Flor and Tereza Batista.

== Plot introduction ==
Banished for promiscuity at the age of 17, Antonieta (Tieta) returns from São Paulo to her native village in the Agreste in Bahia twenty-six years later. Thinking she is now a rich, respectable widow, her family and the village welcome her with open arms. But she is forced to reveal her true identity, as the Madam of São Paulo's best brothel, in order to save Agreste's beaches from an ugly and polluting factory development by calling on assistance from her well-connected clients.

== In the media ==
- In 1989, a television version was made with Betty Faria in the main role.
- In 1996, a film version was made with Sônia Braga in the role of Tieta.
