= Senhor (magazine) =

Monthly cultural magazine published in Brazil (1959–1964)

- Categories: Cultural magazine
- Frequency: Monthly
- Founder: Nahum Sirotsky
- Founded: 1959
- First issue: March 1959
- Final issue: January 1964
- Country: Brazil
- Based in: Rio de Janeiro
- Language: Portuguese

Senhor (also stylized as Sr., Portuguese: Sir) was a monthly cultural magazine published in the period of 1959 and 1964. The magazine was headquartered in Rio de Janeiro, Brazil.

== History and profile ==
Senhor was established by Nahum Sirotsky in 1959. Nahum Sirotsky was a Brazilian diplomat and journalist, who hailed from a Jewish family. The first issue of Senhor was published in March 1959, and its headquarters was in Rio de Janeiro. Senhor was published on a monthly basis.

Senhor was very creative in terms of graphic design which is regarded as one of the significant projects in the Brazilian press of the 1960s. The covers of Senhor were produced by well known artists, including artist Carlos Scliar and caricaturist Jaguar. The latter also served as the main caricaturist of the magazine. Regular contributors were Paulo Francis, Armando Nogueira, Luiz Lobo, Clarice Lispector, Otto Lara Resende, Carlos Heitor Cony, Graciliano Ramos, Rubem Braga Jorge Amado and Carlos Drummond de Andrade.

Senhor's target audience was the Brazilian upper-classes with higher levels of education. The magazine featured articles concerning literature, visual arts, society and politics. The novella by Jorge Amado, The Two Deaths of Quincas Wateryell, was first published in the inauguration issue of Senhor, which was later published as a book. Various stories of Clarice Lispector were also first published in the magazine, including Uma grama de radium-Mineirinho in 1962. Two years later the story was published in her book named A Legião Estrangeira.

Senhor folded with the January 1964 issue after producing a total of 59 issues.
