= Gabriela (1975 TV series) =

- Genre: Telenovela, Drama, Romantic, Comedy
- Created by: Jorge Amado
- Written by: Walter George Durst
- Directed by: Walter Avancini
- Starring: Sônia Braga; Armando Bógus; Paulo Gracindo; Nívea Maria; José Wilker; Elizabeth Savalla; Marco Nanini
- Opening theme: "Modinha para Gabriela" - Gal Costa
- Country of origin: Brazil
- Original language: Portuguese
- No. of episodes: 132

Production
- Producer: Daniel Filho
- Running time: 50 minutes

Original release
- Network: TV Globo
- Release: 14 April – 24 October 1975

Related
- O Rebu; O Grito; Gabriela (2012)

Gabriela is a 1975 Brazilian telenovela based on the 1958 novel of the same name by Jorge Amado, starring Sônia Braga in the title role.

A remake was produced and aired by Globo in 2012, with Juliana Paes playing the lead role.

== Plot ==
Walter George Durst's free adaptation of Jorge Amado's novel Gabriela, Cravo e Canela (1958), takes place in 1925, when a devastating drought forces the hungry populations of the Brazilian Northeast to emigrate in search of survival. In the novel, the destination is Ilhéus, in the south of Bahia, a region in expansion thanks to the planting and commerce of cacao. Gabriela (Sônia Braga) is one of the victims of the drought. Free and impulsive, she gets a job as a cook at the home of the "Turkish" Nacib (Armando Bógus), with whom she lives a sensual love story.

== Background ==
Gabriela was created to give time for the production of the telenovela O Rebu, by Braulio Pedroso, but O Rebu ended up being aired first, and Gabriela was aired to celebrate the ten year anniversary of TV Globo.

Producer Daniel Filho said that during the search for the ideal woman to take the role of Gabriela, they first tried something unusual, offering the role to Gal Costa, but the singer from Bahia declined, claiming she did not know how to act. Afterwards, numerous tests were done, but the director decided that the role would have to go to Sônia Braga after seeing her performance in Caminhos do Coração – Caso Especial, written and directed by Domingos Oliveira in 1971, and insisted with Boni that she be chosen. The actress ended up strongly identified with the character, and would reprise the role again in the 1983 film Gabriela, directed by Bruno Barreto, acting alongside the Italian Marcello Mastroianni.

Gabriela was the first Brazilian telenovela to air in Portugal in May 1977, on RTP, and established Sônia Braga as a sex symbol.

== Cast ==
Actor	Character
Sônia Braga	Gabriela
Armando Bogus	Nacib
Paulo Gracindo	Ramiro Bastos
José Wilker	Mundinho Falcão
Nívea Maria	Gerusa Bastos
Elizabeth Savalla	Malvina Tavares
Fúlvio Stefanini	Tonico Bastos
Eloísa Mafalda	Maria Machadão
Maria Fernanda	Dona Sinhazinha Guedes Mendonça
Ângela Leal	Olga Bastos
Gilberto Martinho	Melk Tavares
Dina Sfat	Zarolha
Jayme Barcellos	Doutor Ezequiel Prado
Marco Nanini	Professor Josué
Ary Fontoura	Doutor Pelópidas Clóvis Costa
Roberto Bonfim	Chico Chicão
Francisco Dantas	Jesuíno Mendonça
Hemílcio Fróes	Alfredo Bastos
Neila Tavares	Anabela Fernandes Prado
Luiz Orioni	João Fulgêncio
Paulo Gonçalves	Maurício Caíres
Ana Ariel	Idalina Tavares
Rafael de Carvalho	Coriolano
Mário Gomes	Berto Leal
Cosme dos Santos	Tuísca
Castro Gonzaga	Doutor Amâncio Leal
Thelma Reston	Arminda
Tonico Pereira	Chico Moleza
Milton Gonçalves	Filó
Marcos Paulo	Eng. Rômulo Vieira
Sônia Oiticica	Sílvia Bastos
Ana Maria Magalhães	Glória
João Paulo Adour	Osmundo Pimentel
Jorge Cherques	Priest Basílio
Ilva Niño	Dona Filomena
