= Home Is the Sailor =

Home Is the Sailor may refer to:

- "Home is the sailor", a line from Robert Louis Stevenson's inscribed tombstone, Requiem
- Home Is the Sailor (Cheers), a 1987 episode of Cheers
- Home Is the Sailor (novel), a 1961 novel by Jorge Amado
- "Home Is the Sailor", a 1949 short story by Dorothy Black
- "Home Is the Sailor", a song by Ivor Cutler from the album Privilege
- Home Is the Sailor, a 1952 novel by Day Keene, reprinted by Hard Case Crime
- Home Is the Sailor, a 1964 children's book by Rumer Godden
- Home Is the Sailor, a 1983 book by Robin Lee Graham with Derek Gill
- Home Is the Sailor, a comic by John Ridgway, published in Warrior
