= The Discovery of America by the Turks =

1994 novel by Jorge Amado

- First edition
- Author: Jorge Amado
- Original title: A Descoberta da América pelos Turcos
- Language: Portuguese
- Publisher: Editora Record
- Publication date: 1994
- Publication place: Brazil
- English publication date: 2012
- Media type: Print (Hardback & Paperback)
- Pages: 171 pp (first edition, paperback)
- ISBN: 85-01-04161-0 (first edition, paperback)
- OCLC: 30948862
- LC Class: PQ9697.A647 D47 1994

The Discovery of America by the Turks (Portuguese: A Descoberta da América pelos Turcos) is a Brazilian Modernist novel. It was written by Jorge Amado in 1994 but not published in English until 2012. Amado tells how, in 1991, he was approached by an organization in Italy to write a story to celebrate the fifth centennial of the discovery of the American continent. This would be published in a book, together with stories by Norman Mailer and Carlos Fuentes, which would be handed out to passengers flying between Italy and Central, North and South America in 1992, the year of the fifth centennial. Amado submitted The Discovery of America by the Turks but the Italian book was never published, leaving Amado free to publish the 77-page story as a separate volume.

The novel itself was based on a chapter prepared and subsequently rejected by Amado for an earlier novel, Showdown. As a postscript to The Discovery of America by the Turks, his wife, Zélia Gattai, describes how she rescued the rejected manuscript from the trash can and saved it.

The two leading characters of the book are, in fact, from Syria and Lebanon. The word Turk was used generically in Brazil to refer to Arabs. According to Amado this stemmed from the fact that the earliest arrivals to Brazil from the Middle East carried papers issued by the Ottoman Empire. Raduan Murad and Jamil Bichara arrived in Brazil on the same ship in 1903 and maintained a friendship even though Raduan remained near the Bahia coast at Itabuna, a thriving cocoa center, while Jamil headed inland to work first as a cocoa buyer and then to operate a small store. The story revolves around the attempts of Raduan to persuade his friend to marry the unattractive daughter of another friend, Ibrahim, with a share of Ibrahim's store as the reward. In a foreword to the novel, José Saramago describes it as a "Brazilian picaresque", where people "think only of fornicating, of piling up money and lovers, and of drinking bouts".
