= Gabriela (1983 film) =

1983 film by Bruno Barreto

- Italian film poster
- Directed by: Bruno Barreto
- Written by: Bruno Barreto; Leopoldo Serran; Flávio R. Tambellini
- Based on: Gabriela, Clove and Cinnamon by Jorge Amado
- Produced by: Ibrahim Moussa; Harold Nebenzal
- Starring: Sônia Braga; Marcello Mastroianni
- Cinematography: Carlo Di Palma
- Edited by: Emmanuelle Castro
- Music by: Antonio Carlos Jobim
- Production companies: United Artists; Sultana Corporation; Metro
- Distributed by: MGM/UA Entertainment Co. (through United International Pictures)
- Release dates: 24 March 1983 (Brazil); 31 January 1984 (Italy)
- Running time: 99 minutes
- Countries: Brazil; Italy
- Language: Portuguese
- Box office: $1.3 million

Gabriela is a 1983 romantic comedy film directed and co-written by Bruno Barreto, starring Sônia Braga and Marcello Mastroianni. It is based on Jorge Amado's 1958 novel Gabriela, Clove and Cinnamon.

== Plot ==
In 1925, Nacib Saad is the owner of a bar in Ilhéus. He meets Gabriela and he hires her as a cook. They soon enter a passionate relationship, fueled by his strong attraction to her sensual nature. However, Nacib soon grows annoyed by the attention she receives. Under advisement of his best friend, Tonico, Nacib proposes to her, partly in the hopes that the attention is quelled.

After their marriage, he insists that she dress and behave more modestly so they can be seen as more respectable. Unfortunately, Gabriela cannot help but stray and Nacib is forced to annul the marriage when he finds her in bed with Tonico. Later, as both Nacib and the town begin to undergo a transformation, Nacib and Gabriela resume their relationship.

== Cast ==
- Sônia Braga as Gabriela
- Marcello Mastroianni as Nacib Saad
- Antonio Cantafora as Tonico Bastos
- Paulo Goulart as João Fulgêncio
- Ricardo Petráglia as Prof. Josué
- Lutero Luiz as Manoel das Onças
- Tania Boscoli as Glória
- Nicole Puzzi as Malvina
- Flávio Galvão as Mundinho Falcão
- Joffre Soares as Ramiro Bastos
- Maurício do Valle as Amâncio Leal
- Nildo Parente as Maurício Caires
- Nelson Xavier as Capitão
- Nuno Leal Maia as Eng. Rômulo
- Chico Díaz as Chico Moleza
- Fernando Ramos da Silva as Tuísca
- Miriam Pires as Malvina's mother
- Cláudia Jimenez as Olga

== Production ==
Amado's novel had previously been adapted into a 1975 telenovela, also starring Sônia Braga in the titular role. The film was shot in the cities of Paraty, in the state of Rio de Janeiro, and Garopaba, Santa Catarina.

== Reception ==
In a mixed review for the Chicago Sun-Times, Roger Ebert wrote "This is the sort of movie that works best as farce. Oddly enough, Gabriela is more of a sweet little love story, in which, after everything else has failed, the hypocritical attitudes of society are overcome by lust. The movie is low-key and sort of old-fashioned, except for the startling frankness with which it portrays the beauty of Sonia Braga’s body. She also has a wonderful smile, and a wonderful gift for vaulting over walls."
