= Gabriela (2012 TV series) =

2012 Brazilian telenovela

- Genre: Telenovela, Romantic
- Created by: Jorge Amado
- Based on: Gabriela, by Walter George Durst; Gabriela, Cravo e Canela, by Jorge Amado
- Written by: Walcyr Carrasco
- Directed by: Mauro Mendonça Filho
- Starring: Juliana Paes; Humberto Martins; Antônio Fagundes; Luiza Valdetaro; Mateus Solano; Vanessa Giácomo; Anderson di Rizzi; José Wilker; Maitê Proença; Erik Marmo; Ivete Sangalo; Leona Cavalli; Marcelo Serrado; Marco Pigossi; Giovanna Lancelotti
- Opening theme: Modinha para Gabriela by Gal Costa
- Country of origin: Brazil
- Original language: Portuguese
- No. of episodes: 77

Production
- Camera setup: Multiple-camera setup
- Running time: 35 minutes 20 minutes (Wednesdays)
- Production companies: Estúdios Globo; Warner Bros. International Television (copyright holder)

Original release
- Network: Globo
- Release: 18 June – 26 October 2012

Related
- O Astro (2011); Saramandaia (2013); Gabriela (original series)

Gabriela is a Brazilian telenovela created by Jorge Amado (written by Walcyr Carrasco) and starring Juliana Paes and Humberto Martins. It premiered on June 18, 2012 on Rede Globo at 11pm timeslot.

It stars Juliana Paes, Humberto Martins, Antônio Fagundes, José Wilker, Mateus Solano, Chico Diaz, Leona Cavalli, Vanessa Giácomo, Marcelo Serrado, Maitê Proença, Erik Marmo, Ivete Sangalo and Laura Cardoso in the leading roles.

== Synopsis ==
Naïve and provocative Gabriela is a raggedy migrant worker who arrives in town to mesmerize all with her playful and simple, yet raw sensuality. Set in 1925, the story unravels in Ilhéus, a quiet northeastern coastal city thriving with cocoa crops and aspirations for progress, even though the traditional ways still rule. Fleeing the drought from the Brazilian backlands, gorgeous Gabriela fascinates everyone with her beauty. At first unaware of the ardent love that will grow between them, Nacib, a Turkish immigrant who owns the Vesuvio bar, hires Gabriela (played by Juliana Paes – India, A Love Story) to cook at his establishment. She waits on the Colonels whose political powers dictate the gossip ridden town. But Gabriela's irresistible beauty and earthy sensuality continue to unintentionally trigger every man's lustful desire, driving Nacib to the brink of jealous insanity. He realizes he cannot live without her, and when he finds out his burning passion is mutual, Nacib asks Gabriela to marry him. Gabriela accepts his proposal, much to the dismay of the colonels who long for her. When they aren’t hanging out at Nacib's bar drinking, the colonels are either oppressing their wives and daughters or spending money at Bataclan, the opulent local brothel. Most men in town converge there to be entertained by scantily clad, chic local prostitutes. Colonel Ramiro Bastos has the last word when it comes to keeping the town conservative. But new arrival Mundinho Falcão, a handsome young liberalist who challenges the colonels’ imposed control, falls madly in love with Colonel Bastos' granddaughter, Gerusa. The young couple will have to stand up to her grandfather, the most powerful man in town, in order to stay together. Meanwhile, Gabriela and Nacib will have to face up to the conspiracy of those who wish to break them up. Zarolha, a bitter and heart-broken Bataclan prostitute, struggles to win back Nacib's tenderness. She counts on the help of self-seeking Tonico, Nacib's new so-called friend who secretly pants after Gabriela, and together they plot against the couple. He influences Nacib to bind Gabriela to the social norms that oppose her free nature, unleashing unpredictable consequences. Gabriela's impulsive, unbound spontaneity contrasts with the false morals defined by a society filled with various gossipy, humorous, naïve, seductive, amusing, and mysterious characters. Gabriela's torrid presence in town disturbs the traditional ways and implicit inclinations of the townspeople. In a new version of one of TV's greatest hits, based on the immortal literary work of Jorge Amado, Gabriela renders a vivid portrayal of a steamy love story that incites everyone to tune in to their own inherent desires.

== Cast ==
=== Main cast ===
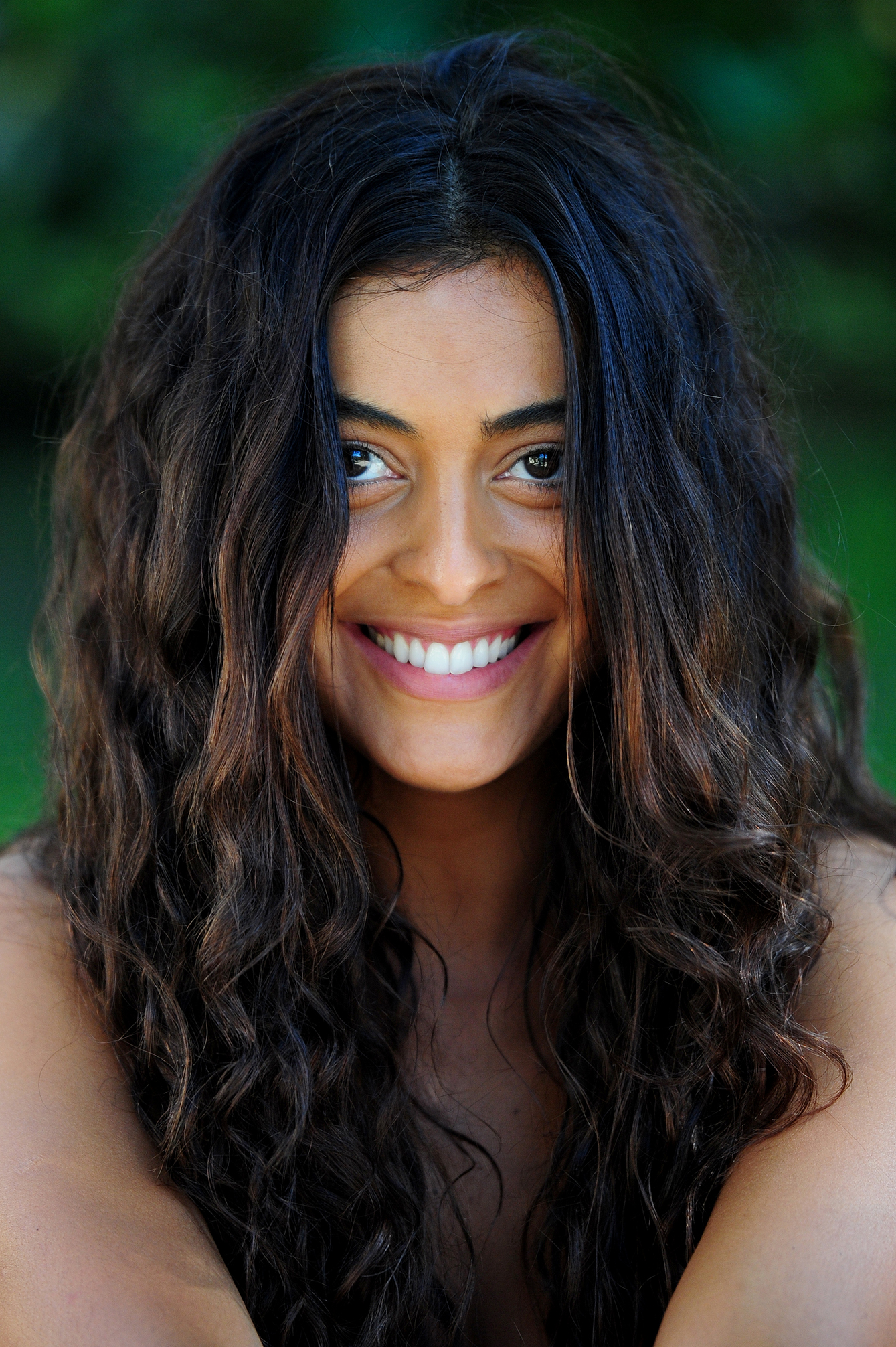
Juliana Paes played the protagonist Gabriela..

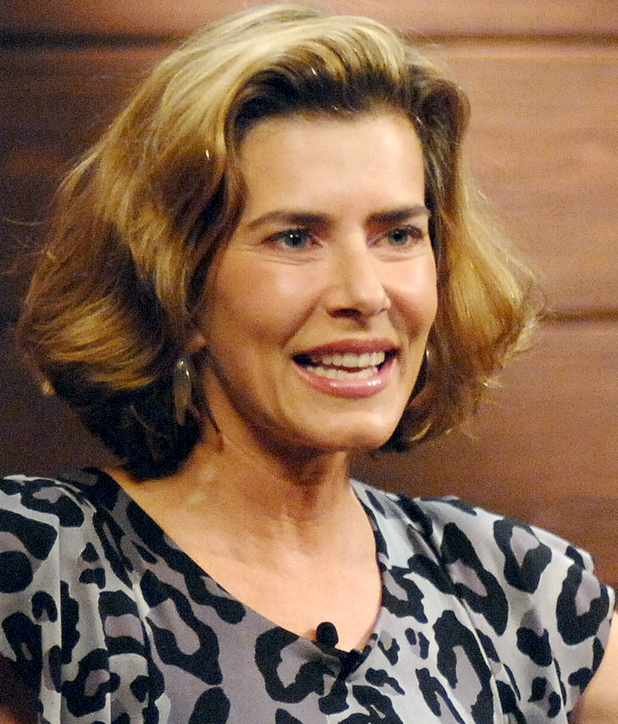
Maitê Proença played Sinhazinha Guedes Mendonça.

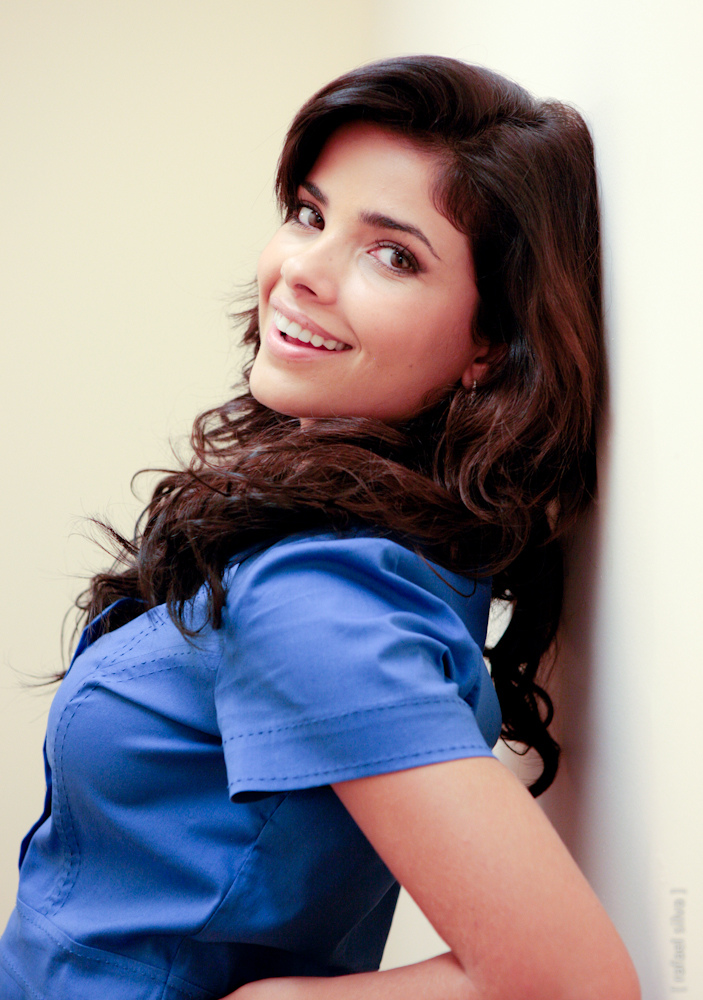
Vanessa Giácomo played Malvina.

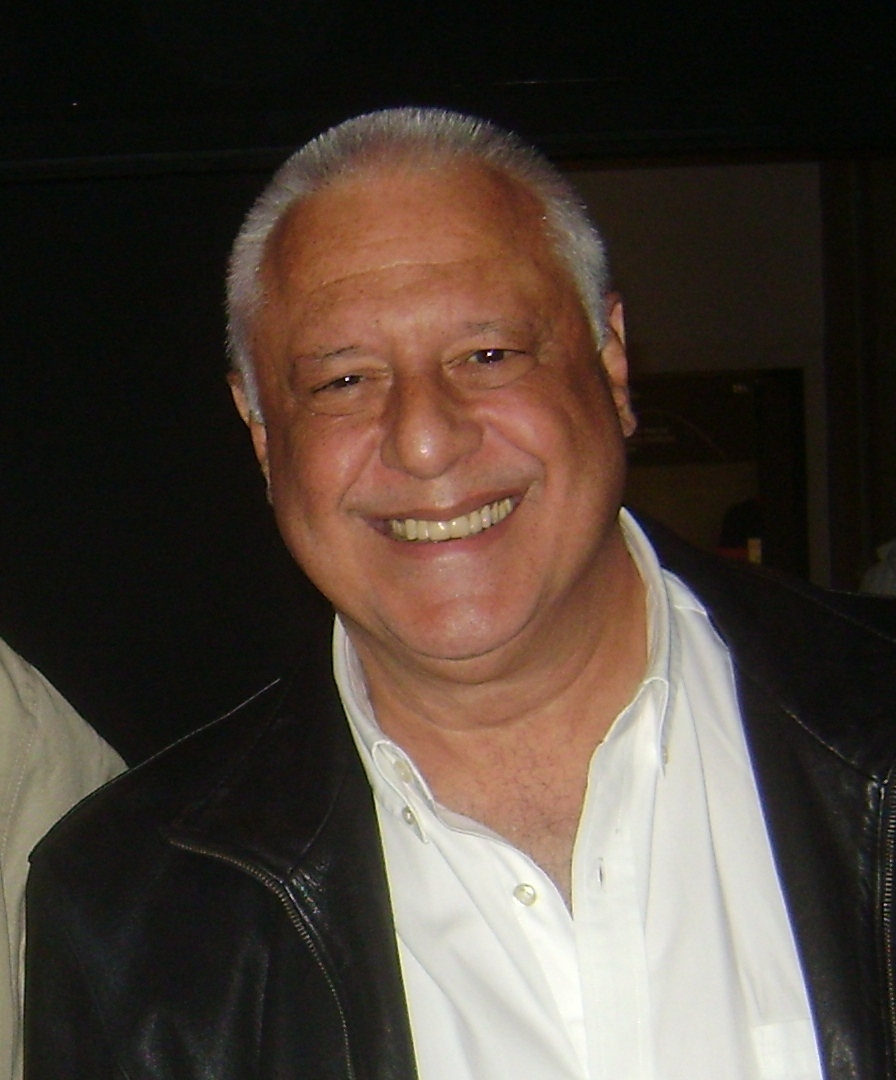
Antônio Fagundes played the antagonist Ramiro.

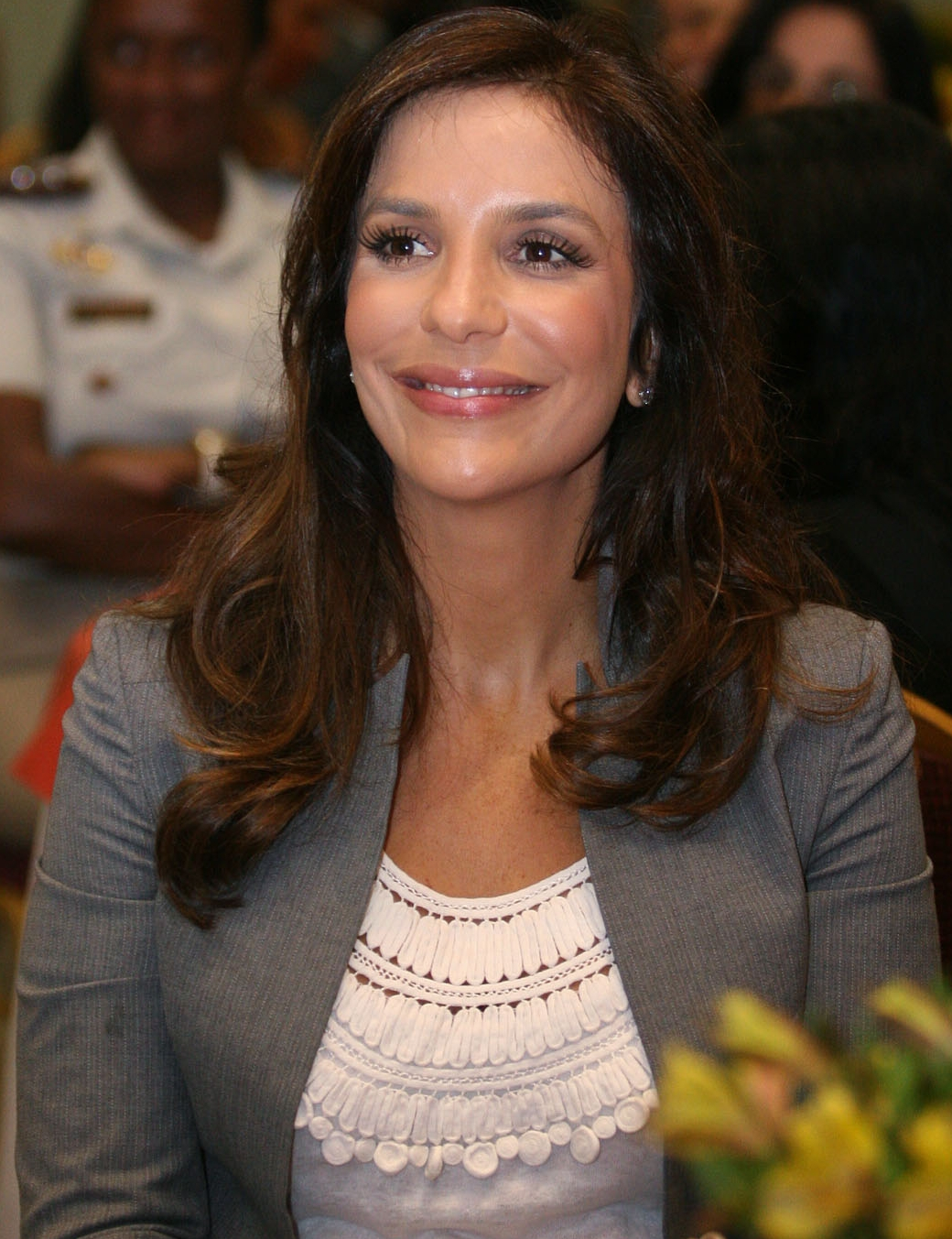
Ivete Sangalo played Maria Machadão.

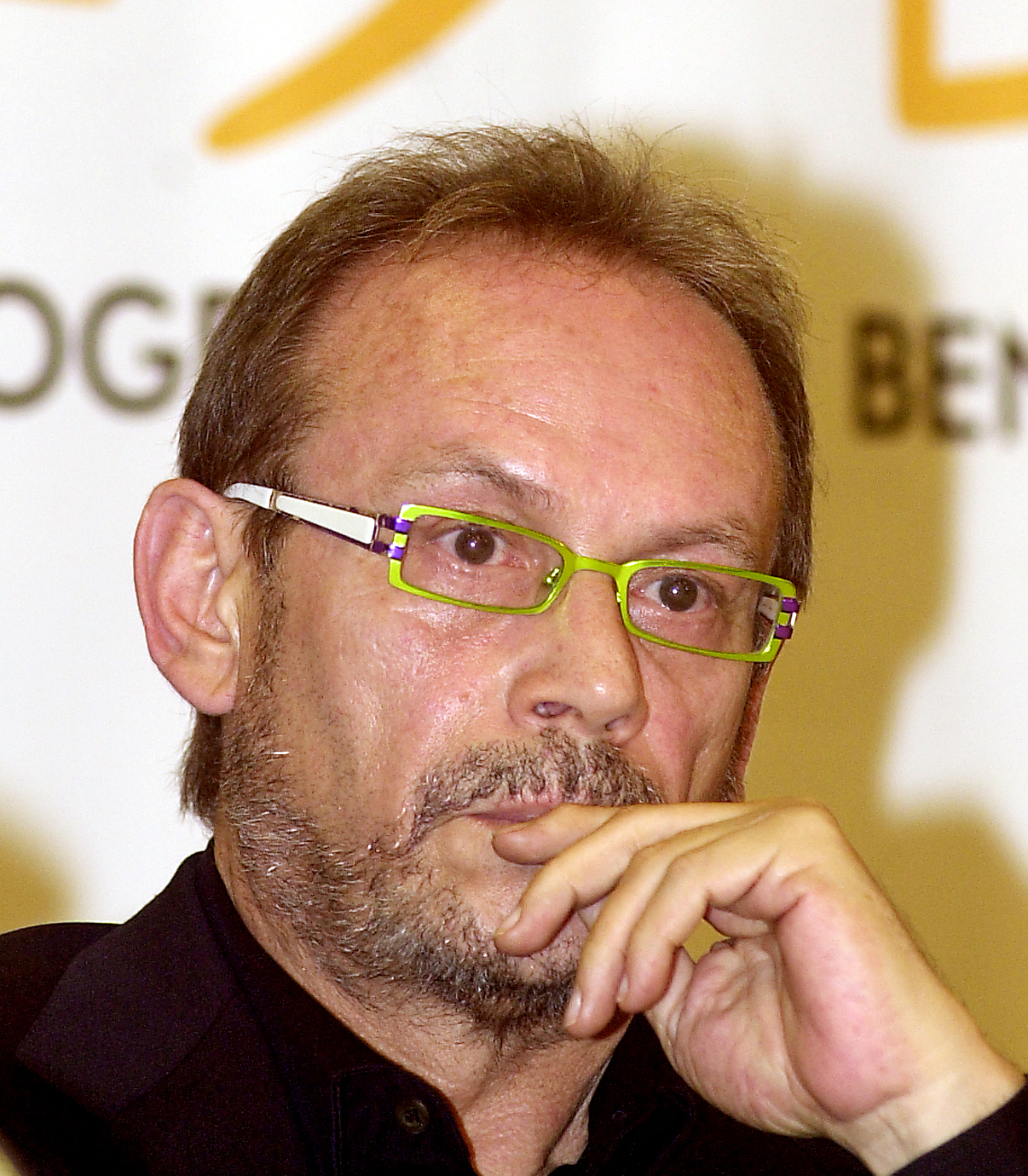
José Wilker played Jesuíno Mendonça.

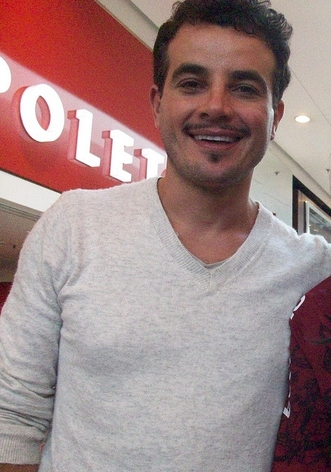
Anderson di Rizzi played Professor Josué.

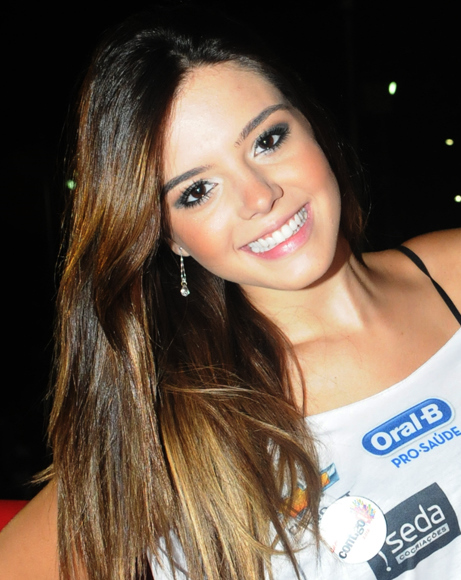
Giovanna Lancelotti played Lindinalva.

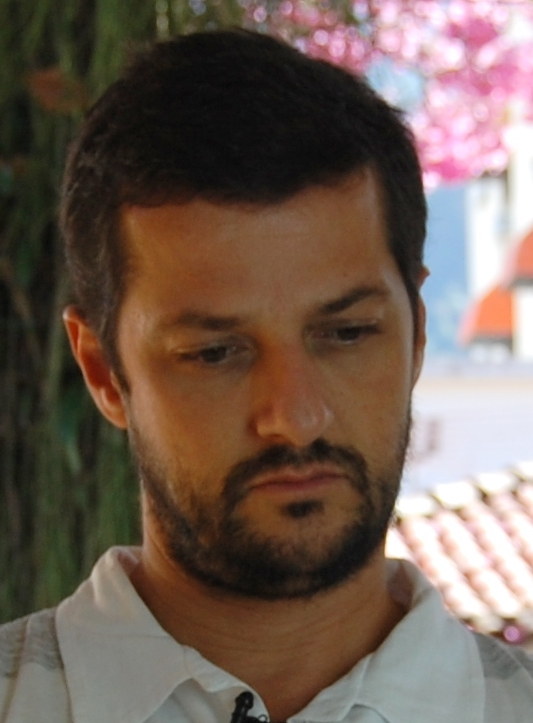
Marcelo Serrado played Tonico Bastos.

Actor	Character
Juliana Paes	Gabriela da Silva Saad (Bié)
Humberto Martins	Nacib Achcar Saad
Antônio Fagundes	Prefeito Ramiro Bastos
Mateus Solano	Mundinho Falcão
Luiza Valdetaro	Gerusa Bastos
Vanessa Giácomo	Malvina Tavares
Laura Cardoso	Dona Dorotéia Leal (Dodô Tanajura)
José Wilker	Jesuíno Mendonça
Maitê Proença	Dona Sinházinha Guedes Mendonça
Ivete Sangalo	Maria Machadão
Leona Cavalli	Zarolha (Risoleta)
Marcelo Serrado	Tonico Bastos
Giovanna Lancellotti	Lindinalva (Linda)
Marco Pigossi	Juvenal Leal
Rodrigo Andrade	Berto Leal
Chico Diaz	Coronel Melk Tavares
Henri Castelli	Rômulo Vieira
Fabiana Karla	Olga Bastos
Genézio de Barros	Coronel Amâncio Leal
Mauro Mendonça	Manoel das Onças
Suzana Pires	Glória Damasceno (Glorinha)
Ary Fontoura	Coriolano Damasceno
Vera Zimmermann	Conceição Bastos
Emanuelle Araújo	Teodora
Nelson Xavier	Fazendeiro Altino Brandão
Gero Camilo	Miss Pirangi
Lúcio Mauro	Eustáquio Ferreira
Bel Kutner	Marinalva Tavares
Neusa Maria Faro	Dona Arminda
Bete Mendes	Florzinha dos Reis
Anderson di Rizzi	Professor Josué
José Rubens Chachá	Dr. Ezequiel
Frank Menezes	Padre Cecílio
Jackson Costa	Douglas
Harildo Deda	Ribeirinho
Edmílson Barros	Nhô Galo
Pascoal da Conceição	João Fulgêncio
Cláudio Mendes	Doutor Maurício Caíres
Nathália Rodrigues	Natascha
Ildi Silva	Quitéria
Suyane Moreira	Mara
Ângela Rebello	Quinquina dos Reis
Daniel Ribeiro	Clemente
Ilya São Paulo	Dr. Pelópidas Clóvis Costa
Amanda Richter	Iracema Mendonça
Raquel Villar	Ina (Durvalina)
Heloísa Jorge	Fabiana
Jhe Oliveira	Negro Fagundes
Fernanda Pontes	Zuleika
Izabella Bicalho	Dona Rita
Bertrand Duarte	Alfredo Bastos
Carlos Betão	Alceu
Yaçanã Martins	Néia de Oliveira
Neco Villa-lobos	Sacristão Cosme
Sérgio Maciel	Damião
Rejane Maya	Zulmira
Widoto Áquila	Loirinho
Telma Souza	Prazeres
Clara Paixão	Miquelina
Everton Machado	Sete Voltas
Renan Ribeiro	Chico Moleza
Max Lima	Tuísca
Anna Gabriela Marques	Maria Lupicínia
Felipe Gimenez	Ramirinho
Gustavo Mello	Bento
Kaic Crescente	Ladislau
Emílio Orciollo Netto	Príncipe Sandra
Bruna Linzmeyer	Anabela Fernandes Prado
Erik Marmo	Dr. Osmundo Pimentel

=== Supporting cast ===
Actor	Character
Alan Pellegrino	Serapião
Antônio Carlos Feio	chapeleiro
Bella Flor	
Bianca Miranda	
Bianka Fernandes	prostituta do Bataclan
Chico Mello	capanga do Prefeito Ramiro
Cíntia Mei	prostituta do Bataclan
João Cunha	Antenor
Liz Moraes	mãe de moça que berto tenta seduzir
Lucas Domso	
Marcia di Milla	Almira
Raquel Fabbri	prostituta do Bataclan
Rhavine Chrispim	Raquel
Val Perre	capanga do Prefeito Ramiro
Vanderson Caires	Bico Fino
Vera Ferreira	Rosália
Werles Pajero	atendente da loja de tecidos

=== Special Units ===
Actor	Character
Aicha Marques	Matilde
Biju Martins	capanga do Doutor Amâncio
Camilo Bevilacqua	pai de Iracema
Carlos Fonte Boa	recepcionista do hotel onde Rômulo fica hospedado
Charles Myara	Saad
Eunice Bráulio	mulher que comenta com as outras mulheres de Ilhéus sobre a morte de Sinhazinha e Osmundo
Everaldo Pontes	Tio Silva
Land Vieira	Juca
Lionel Fischer	pai de Zuleika
Luciana Souza	Filomena
Malu Valle	Mariquinha Saad
Marcello Goncalves	jagunço do fazendeiro
Osvaldo Mil	delegado
Raoni Carneiro	Osório Pimentel
Shimon Nahmias	dono do imóvel que expulsa Lindinalva e Zulmira
Sidney Souto	pai de Ina
Thaís Botelho	moça que Berto tenta seduzir
Valderez Teixeira	senhora no mercado
Zé Carlos Machado	fazendeiro
Tarcísio Meira	Juiz Roberto Lima

== Production ==
In 2023, Giovanna Lancellotti revealed harassment while filming her first sex scene in this series.

== Ratings ==
Timeslot	# Eps.	Premiere		Finale		Rank	Season	Average viewership
Timeslot	# Eps.	Date	Viewers (in points)	Date	Viewers (in points)	Rank	Season	Average viewership
Mondays—Fridays; 11:15 pm	77	18 June 2012	30	26 October 2012	30	#1	2012—13	19

=== Awards and nominations ===
Year	Awards	Category	Nominated	Result	Ref
2012	Extra Television Award	Favorite Lead Actor	Antônio Fagundes	Nominated	
2012	Extra Television Award	Best Supporting Actor	José Wilker	Nominated	
2012	Extra Television Award	Figurino	Gabriela	Nominated	
2012	Extra Television Award	Maquiagem	Gabriela	Nominated	
2012	Extra Television Award	Novela of the Year	Walcyr Carrasco	Nominated	
2012	Who award	Favorite Lead Actor	Antônio Fagundes	Nominated	
2012	Who award	Favorite Lead Actor	Humberto Martins	Nominated	
2012	Who award	Favorite Lead Actor	Marcelo Serrado	Nominated	
2012	Who award	Favorite Lead Actress	Juliana Paes	Nominated	
2012	Who award	Best Supporting Actor	Marco Pigossi	Nominated	
2012	Who award	Best Supporting Actor	Rodrigo Andrade	Nominated	
2012	Who award	Best Supporting Actress	Giovanna Lancellotti	Won	
2012	Who award	Best Supporting Actress	Laura Cardoso	Nominated	
2012	Who award	Best Supporting Actress	Leona Cavalli	Nominated	
2012	Who award	Best Supporting Actress	Luiza Valdetaro	Nominated	
2012	Who award	Best Author	Walcyr Carrasco	Nominated	
2013	Contigo Award! TV	Novela of the Year	Walcyr Carrasco	Nominated	
2013	Contigo Award! TV	Best Actor in a novel	Humberto Martins	Nominated	
2013	Contigo Award! TV	Best Actor in a novel	Antônio Fagundes	Nominated	
2013	Contigo Award! TV	Best Actor in a novel	José Wilker	Nominated	
2013	Contigo Award! TV	Best Actress in a novel	Juliana Paes	Nominated	
2013	Contigo Award! TV	Best Actress in a novel	Luiza Valdetaro	Nominated	
2013	Contigo Award! TV	Melhor Ator Coadjuvante	Marcelo Serrado	Nominated	
2013	Contigo Award! TV	Melhor Ator Coadjuvante	Rodrigo Andrade	Nominated	
2013	Contigo Award! TV	Melhor Ator Coadjuvante	Gero Camilo	Nominated	
2013	Contigo Award! TV	Best Supporting Actress	Giovanna Lancellotti	Nominated	
2013	Contigo Award! TV	Best Supporting Actress	Laura Cardoso	Nominated	
2013	Contigo Award! TV	Best Supporting Actress	Vanessa Giácomo	Nominated	
2013	Contigo Award! TV	Revelation TV	Ivete Sangalo	Won	
2013	Contigo Award! TV	Best child actor	Max Lima	Nominated	
2013	Contigo Award! TV	Best child actor	Filipe Gimenez	Nominated	
2013	Contigo Award! TV	Best child actor	Gustavo Mello	Nominated	
2013	Contigo Award! TV	Best child actor	Kaic Crescente	Nominated	
2013	Contigo Award! TV	Best child actress	Anna Gabriela Marques	Nominated	
2013	Contigo Award! TV	Best Author of Telenovela	Walcyr Carrasco	Nominated	
2013	Contigo Award! TV	Best Telenovela director	Mauro Mendonça Filho and Roberto Talma	Nominated	
