= Jubiabá (film) =

1986 film directed by Nelson Pereira dos Santos

- Brazilian theatrical poster
- Directed by: Nelson Pereira dos Santos
- Written by: Jorge Amado; Nelson Pereira dos Santos; Henry Raillard; Ney Sant'Anna
- Based on: Jubiabá by Jorge Amado
- Produced by: Tininho Fonseca; Roberto Petti; Chico Drumond; Walter Schilke; José Oliosi
- Starring: Charles Baiano; Françoise Goussard; Grande Otelo
- Cinematography: José Medeiros
- Edited by: Yvon Lemier; Ynes Charoy; Catherine Gabrielidis; Sylvie Lhermemier; Alain Fresnot
- Music by: Gilberto Gil
- Production companies: Regina Filmes; Societé Française de Production
- Distributed by: Embrafilme
- Release dates: 1986 (London Film Festival); September 17, 1987 (Brazil)
- Running time: 100 minutes
- Countries: Brazil; France
- Language: Portuguese

Jubiabá (French: Bahia de tous les saints) is a 1986 Brazilian-French romantic drama film directed by Nelson Pereira dos Santos. Based on the novel of the same name by Jorge Amado, it stars Charles Baiano and Françoise Goussard as two lovers.

== Plot ==
The black orphan Balduíno (Charles Baiano) is adopted by the commendator Ferreira (Raymond Pellegrin), and falls in love with Ferreira's heiress, the white Lindinalva (Françoise Goussard). A day, he is kicked out of the Ferreira's house, becoming a famous malandro in Bahia streets. Even away from Lindinalva, their love is blessed by the pai-de-santo Jubiabá (Grande Otelo).

== Cast ==
- Charles Baiano as Antônio Balduíno aka Baldo
  - Luiz Santana as young Balduíno
- Françoise Goussard as Lindinalva
  - Tatiana Issa as young Lindinalva
- Grande Otelo as Jubiabá
- Zezé Motta as Rosenda
- Julien Guiomar as Luigi
- Catherine Rouvel as Amélia
- Betty Faria as Zaira
- Raymond Pellegrin as Ferreira
- Ruth de Souza
- Romeu Evaristo
- Eliana Pittman
