= The Bowels of Liberty =

1954 trilogy of novels by Jorge Amado

- Early edition
- Author: Jorge Amado
- Original title: Os Subterrâneos da Liberdade
- Language: Portuguese
- Publication date: 1954
- Publication place: Brazil

The Bowels of Liberty (Portuguese: Os Subterrâneos da Liberdade) is a trilogy of Brazilian Modernist novels written by Jorge Amado in 1954. The trilogy comprises Bitter Times (Os ásperos tempos), Agony of Night (Agonia da noite) and Light at the End of the Tunnel (A luz no túnel).

Together, the three books of the trilogy represent a detailed criticism of the Getúlio Vargas dictatorship, known as the Estado Novo (1937–45). In these three novels Amado focuses on São Paulo unlike most of his other works which were based in Bahia. The three novels were published in 1954. In the first five editions they were published as a single volume, but from the sixth edition they were released as three separate volumes, as originally planned by Amado.

Bitter Times is set in the time of the beginning of the Novo Estado regime where politicians are shown as pawns of the elite, particularly the bankers. The novel also portrays the weaknesses of other political groupings, such as Trotskyits and union leaders. Written around fifteen years after the fictional events described, the novel sets out to teach Brazilian history and emphasise the role of resistance movements. Much of the plot follows a Communist Party member travelling through Uruguay, where Amado himself lived in exile in the 1930s.

Agony of Night describes the crimes of the Novo Estado regime and the resistance of the Brazilian Communist Party, against the backdrop of the Second World War. The plot follows Doroteu, a docker at the port of Santos. He takes part in a strike against shipment of Brazilian coffee to the Spanish State of caudillo Francisco Franco, a strike that gets significant support throughout São Paulo State. The novel stresses the need for political combat and for resistance against the Brazilian dictatorship.

Light at the End of the Tunnel follows the persecution of the Communist Party after the strikes described in Agony of Night. The story timeline goes up to the 1940 trial of the communist leader Luís Carlos Prestes, about whom Amado also wrote a biography, The Knight of Hope. Amado describes São Paulo police atrocities and characters from the other books in the trilogy re-appear, such as the banker Costa Vale and an American businessman.
