= Showdown (Amado novel) =

1984 novel by Jorge Amado

- First edition
- Author: Jorge Amado
- Original title: Tocaia Grande
- Language: Portuguese
- Publication date: 1984
- Publication place: Brazil
- English publication date: 1988

Showdown (Portuguese: Tocaia Grande) is a Brazilian Modernist novel. It was written by Jorge Amado in 1984.

== Plot ==
The novel deals with the foundation of a community, Tocaia Grande ("big ambush" in Portuguese), in a fertile agricultural zone in the state of Bahia. The ambush referred to in the title is carried out by Natario de Fonseca, a jagunço in the service of a plantation owner, Colonel Boaventura. Twenty gunfighters assembled by the latter's only political rival are killed, effectively destroying the opponent. Natario fell in love with the location of the ambush and resolved to establish a community there. The novel is really about the growth of the village and the petty criminals, runaway servants and prostitutes who drift in and out. Tocaia Grande only really begins to expand, however, when a family, cheated of its land by a colonel in Sergipe, arrives and begins to plant food crops. Their arrival initiates a colourful blending of Bahian traditions with those of the original inhabitants. The reference to families migrating after being thrown off their land mirrors the central theme of an earlier work by Amado, Red Field.

Bandits attack the settlement and are driven off by prostitutes; a flood almost destroys the town; fever kills many. But its final destruction comes because it has remained outside the law as a sort of early anarchist community, with all decisions emerging by unofficial consensus. When the authorities finally decide that they want to control it Tocaia Grande is doomed. The son of Colonel Boaventura, who fell out with Natario because the latter would not work for him after his father's death, sets out to seize the ground with the approval of the state authorities. The story of Tocaia Grande begins and ends in massacre, but not without one final twist.

In Showdown, Amado returns to some of his earliest concerns, confronting the historical criminality of Brazilian society, and aiming to show how Brazil has buried its (criminal) past. In fact Showdown is almost an historical continuation of Amado's novel The Violent Land, first published in 1943. It contains several references to the battles between cacao landowners described in that earlier novel.

In addition to Natario, important characters are a Lebanese immigrant, Fadul, owner of the general store - renowned for his stubbornness and physical strength; Castor de Abduim, a handsome blacksmith, whose companion Diva dies in a cholera outbreak; and Bernarda, a young prostitute who becomes Natario's lover.
