= The Country of Carnival =

First novel of the Brazilian writer Jorge Amado

First edition

The Country of Carnival (Portuguese: O País do Carnaval) is a 1931 novel by Brazilian writer Jorge Amado. In this debut novel, the themes that would come to permeate the author's work can already be seen, albeit in an embryonic form. The book is an account of the typical Brazilian intelligentsia of the 1920s. It has not been translated into English.

== Background ==
The Country of Carnival was Jorge Amado’s first novel, written when he was only 18 at a time when he had enrolled at the law faculty in Rio de Janeiro. The first edition was published in a print run of a thousand copies. It was enthusiastically received by, among others, Rachel de Queiroz. The two met and it was she who introduced him to the Communist Youth. Whilst in Salvador, Bahia during 1927-31, Amado had been a member of the Academia dos Rebeldes (Academy of Rebels), a literary group formed around the journalist and poet Pinheiro Viegas, who Amado credited with having a significant influence on The Country of Carnival. Considered subversive, The Country of Carnival was one of the books of Amado and others that were burned in a public square in Salvador by order of the Vargas Era regime in 1937.

== Plot ==
Son of a wealthy cocoa planter, Paulo Rigger, a Brazilian intellectual who has studied in Europe for seven years, wants to participate in the political and intellectual life of the country. He joins a group of intellectuals in Salvador to discuss matters of love, politics, religion and philosophy. Doubts as to the directions the nation is taking are foremost in the minds of the intellectuals. Rigger criticizes the racial miscegenation of the country and particularly the institution of Carnival, which he blames for the country's lagging development, believing that Carnival keeps people alienated. Its excesses are cause for shock, even if his contact with the people during the street festivities makes him again feel genuinely Brazilian. Confused by these contradictions, Rigger decides to return to Europe.
