= Tereza Batista: Home from the Wars =

1972 novel by Jorge Amado

- First edition
- Author: Jorge Amado
- Original title: Tereza Batista cansada de guerra
- Translator: Barbara Shelby
- Language: Portuguese
- Publisher: Livraria Martins Editora S.A.
- Publication date: 1972
- Publication place: Brazil
- English publication date: 1975
- ISBN: 0-380-75468-1

Tereza Batista: Home from the Wars (Portuguese: Tereza Batista cansada de guerra) is a Brazilian modernist novel. It was written by Jorge Amado in 1972 and was published in English in 1975, with a translation by Barbara Shelby.

== Background ==
Tereza Batista: Home from the Wars is one of Jorge Amado's later novels. While his earlier work provided a left-wing criticism of the economic and environmental exploitation of Brazil, the later novels, beginning with Gabriela, Clove and Cinnamon, became more of a celebration of Brazilian sensuality, accompanied by a fascination with candomblé and the religious influences brought over from Africa. Tereza Batista, the seventh novel after Gabriela, Clove and Cinnamon, is in the same vein, showing affection for the poor of Bahia together with an emphasis on prostitutes and candomblé. He continues in Tereza Batista to use oral narrative with roots in the tradition of popular poetry and folklore. The novel thus contains similarities with another earlier work, Dona Flor and Her Two Husbands and with Gabriela, Clove and Cinnamon in its treatment of love, its social critique, and the atmosphere of Salvador, together with critical portraits of the rich, contrasted with a sympathetic approach to the poor.

According to the author, Gabriela and Dona Flor are two characters with whom people easily identify; hence their popularity. "With Tereza Batista I tried to create a third image of the Brazilian woman – sensual, romantic, courageous, long-suffering, decent." However, others have observed that the precise difference between Tereza and her predecessors is open to some debate.

Tereza Batista won international fame: the headquarters of the Italian Feminist Club, an old palazzo on Via Rugabella in Milan, was named Tereza Batista House. Like several of Amado's works, the novel was turned into a Brazilian soap opera or miniseries and broadcast in 1992 on the Brazilian network Rede Globo.

The novel follows the life of Tereza, but not in chronological order. If presented chronologically, the five sections should have followed the sequence 3, 1, 4, 2 and 5. The novel thus begins with the chronological third part of Tereza's life, and proceeds to the fourth and the fifth parts, with these parts being intersected by the second and fourth parts, representing flashbacks to the earlier stages of Tereza’s life, which are also presented sequentially.

== Plot ==
At thirteen Tereza is sold by her aunt to a ranch owner who treats her like a piece of property, and sexually abuses her. When caught in bed with her lover she defends herself against the ranch owner’s violence with a knife and ends up in jail. Freed by a long-time admirer, she eventually ends up in a brothel. Escaping from there she heads for Sergipe, where more troubles await her: she falls for a married man, and helps fight an outbreak of smallpox alongside the prostitutes of the small town of Buquim. She then moves to Salvador da Bahia, where she leads a movement of prostitutes, and institutes the so-called "closed-basket strike" on the night the American Navy comes to town. A happy ending is provided when her true love arrives at the church just in time to rescue her from a marriage of convenience.
