= Sweat (novel) =

1934 Brazilian novel by Jorge Amado

- First edition
- Author: Jorge Amado
- Original title: Suor
- Cover artist: Santa Rosa
- Language: Portuguese
- Publisher: Ariel
- Publication date: 1934
- Publication place: Brazil
- Pages: 211

Sweat (Portuguese: Suor) is a Brazilian Modernist novel. It was written by Jorge Amado in 1934. It has yet to be translated into English.

== Background ==
Sweat, Jorge Amado's third novel, was written in Rio de Janeiro in 1934, when he was 22 and an active communist supporter. The next year, the book was translated into Russian and published in Moscow, along with Cacau, his second work. Sweat is directly linked to the author's personal experience. In 1928, at just sixteen, he took a small room in the Pelourinho (in Salvador, Bahia), where he could witness the daily lives of the men and women forced to live in cramped conditions. In a Postface to his book, Captains of the Sands, Amado wrote that Sweat was the third work in the six-novel cycle he called "The Bahian Novels" in which he had tried to set down the "life, the customs, the language of my State". He described Sweat as exposing "the most failed aspect of the State, creatures who have already lost everything and expect nothing more from life". Amado writes that he had the action take place "in one of those strange tenements on the Ladeiro do Pelourinho" in Salvador and he did it with an aim, not only because he had met most of the characters in one of those tenements, where he had himself lived, but as much because it seemed to him that only in that environment could the novel take on a tone of revolt in the face of their anguish and misery. In Amado's own words, Sweat and Cacau together form the portfolio of an “apprentice novelist”. The novel features concerns that would be returned to in his later works.

== The book ==
The novel is a portrait of the daily misery of urban life in Salvador. The title, Sweat, indicates both the novel's aim and its earthy style. 600 people live in the building on the Pelourinho, including workers, washerwomen, prostitutes, and anarchists. Their stories follow each other but the main character is the tenement itself. The rooms are divided and subdivided and even the patio is rented out. The only empty spaces are the stairs, which the residents use as a toilet and where rubbish piles up. Amado uses a documentary or modernist style to portray the exploitation of the working poor. His use of pieces of descriptive detail gives earthy images of their squalid living conditions but there are also early signs of the romanticism to be found in his later works.
