= Red Field =

1946 novel by Jorge Amado

- First edition
- Author: Jorge Amado
- Original title: Seara Vermelha
- Language: Portuguese
- Publisher: Livraria Martins Editora, Sao Paulo
- Publication date: 1946
- Publication place: Brazil
- Pages: 319

Red Field (Portuguese: Seara Vermelha) is a Brazilian Modernist novel. It was written by Jorge Amado. It has not been published in English.

== Background ==
Jorge Amado published Red Field in 1946. In 1945, Brazil had entered a period of “redemocratization” and Amado was elected federal deputy for São Paulo as a candidate of the Brazilian Communist Party. He had long campaigned for the rights of political prisoners accused of being communists. He wrote The ABC of Castro Alves, a biography of the poet from Bahia, before going into exile in Uruguay and Argentina, where he researched the life of the revolutionary leader Luís Carlos Prestes, which he published in 1942 as The Knight of Hope. Red Field is dedicated to Prestes and it includes bits of verse by Castro Alves and a quotation from Prestes himself. The novel is highly political, a feature of the early phases of the author's work, but unlike most of his novels, the action does not take place in the city of Salvador or in the cocoa growing areas around Ilheus. The hinterlands of the Northeast of Brazil are the setting for the often bloody disputes between landowners and their workers.

Seara Vermelha was published by Amado in the final year of the Brazil's Estado Novo regime, a regime under the presidency of Getúlio Vargas. The regime was known for its authoritarian, anti-communist and anti-left wing stance. During the Vargas regime, Brazil underwent agricultural reform and ́'varguistá' ́ legislation. The reforms followed the international economic crash of 1929 and the devaluation of coffee exports. The Vargas regime wanted to produce more economic wealth and production from the Brazilian agricultural sectors instead of relying on external help, especially in the south such as Rio Grande Do Sul, and the north such as Paraíba. However, the regime left the north-east (the setting of this novel) relatively untouched by reform and development due to fear of resistance as it was an established area of support. The Vargas regime internalised control over the farms and production, essentially moving executive power to the cities, but also resisted to modernise the structure of countryside economy in favor of the large traditional farm estates and wealthy landlords. Especially in north-eastern Brazil, the agricultural reforms seen under Vargas without doubt caused a ́ ́questão agrária´´(agricultural question) within the academic and political sphere at the time of the writing and publication of 'Seara Vermelha' ('Red Field') . Especially as the contrast between wealth and quality of life for those in the cities and for those in the countryside became ever more apparent, and the toil and suffering under poverty for the rural worker only continued.

As for the political context of the text, author Jorge Amado wrote it at the time of being the federal deputy of the Communist Party in Brazil. Furthermore, the text was written during other major the geo-political contexts of the 1930s and 40s, such as; the consequences of the Wall Street crash and the consequences of the Second World War leading on to the Cold War. These geo-political contexts led to deep political divides between communist and right wing conservatism ideologies, especially in regards to the idea of a growing capitalism in a new era. These divides and the 'communist versus capitalist' questions were omnipresent within Brazil and its agricultural sector at the time of publication of this book, and were certainly urgent in the mind of Amado.

== Plot ==
The lands on which Jerônimo and Jacundina have worked for 20 years change hands, and the new owner expels the settlers. They decide to head for work in the coffee plantations in São Paulo state, taking with them two of their children, three grandchildren, and two of Jerônimo's brothers and their families. Red Field is about the struggle of the displaced for decent conditions and a place to sleep. The travellers suffer from a lack of food and the harshness of the landscape. Half-starved, they finally reach the banks of the São Francisco River, from where they plan to continue their journey by boat. But only four eventually reach the coffee plantations, the rest dying on the way. Those who choose to remain on the arid Northeast plains of Brazil try to get by as best they can. One of the three remaining sons becomes a soldier, one a hired gunman, and one joins the Communist Party. As such, Red Field points to the different alternatives, some more extreme than others, that are open to the people of remote and poor areas: leave, take up religion or crime, or take up revolutionary struggle.

A movie of the same name based upon the novel was released in 1964.

Seara Vermelha primarily explores the themes of suffering within poverty. Amado also explores the idea of nature and the inhospitality of the Brazilian north eastern wilderness and landscape through which the characters must travel to search for a better life in São Paulo. Finally the theme of revolution and consistent suffering in hopes for a better life in the future is consistent throughout the entire text. The idea that the Brazilian countryside is a place of exhaustive struggle, revolt and pain are clear to interpret, yet Amado also incorporates the importance of the sense of community and loyalty within the context of the rural struggle. These are the ideas upon which the text is constructed. Clearly the book is promoting an anti-capitalist, and anti Estado Novo stance and also painting a socialist picture of communal revolt in the context of economic hardship for the peasant worker.
