= Carlos Bastos =

Brazilian artist and painter

Carlos Bastos (1925–2004) was an artist and painter, leader of the Brazilian Modernist Movement. Bastos was the author of many significant works, including the Saint John the Baptist Chapel mural at the Parque e Museu Histórico Nacional, in Rio de Janeiro and the vast murals for the Bahian Congress Building. Bastos is mentioned in two of Jorge Amado´s books.
