= Home Is the Sailor (novel) =

Novel by the Brazilian writer Jorge Amado

- First edition
- Author: Jorge Amado
- Original title: Os velhos marinheiros ou o capitão de longo curso
- Translator: Harriet de Onís
- Language: Portuguese
- Publisher: Livraria Martins Editora
- Publication date: 1961
- Publication place: Brazil
- English publication date: 1964 (Alfred A. Knopf)
- ISBN: 0380451875

Home Is the Sailor (Portuguese: Os velhos marinheiros ou o capitão de longo curso, lit. "The old sailors or the long haul captain ") is a Brazilian modernist novel. It was written by Jorge Amado in 1961, and translated into English by Harriet de Onís in 1964.

== Background ==
Home is the Sailor was finished by Jorge Amado in early 1961, the year in which he was elected to the Brazilian Academy of Letters. It was originally published in a volume of the same name, along with the short novel The Two Deaths of Quincas Wateryell. Told as an old-mariner's tale, the story paints a portrait of Bahian society in the early 20th century as represented by the small coastal town of Periperi.

== Plot ==
In his old age Vasco Moscoso Aragão, Master Mariner, arrives in Periperi. His stories of distant and exotic ports and exotic and sensual women, make all the town's inhabitants become envious. The sole exception is Chico Pacheco, who does not believe him, and thinks that he is a braggart. After some investigation in Salvador, Chico returns with his version of events: Vasco is a wealthy businessman who lived a bohemian life in his youth with a group of friends, and who then took the title of Commander to satisfy his desire to have a title and not simply be known as "Mr. Vasco". His friends gave him the title of commander, and even awarded him a medal, obtained illegally. Vasco identified himself so strongly with his role that he started to wear official uniforms complete with medals, smoking his pipe, and collecting sea objects.

Now the two versions of Vasco's life, the commander's and Chico Pacheco's, divide the town into those who believe in the commander and those who believe him to be a boastful liar.

Fate leads Vasco Moscoso to command a ship sailing from Salvador to Belém, stopping in various ports along the coast. The commander also decides to show his friends of Periperi that he is a real sea captain.

The trip takes place without incident; in fact, Vasco leaves the management to the second officer. But upon arrival in the state of Parà in Belém, the second officer makes fun of the commander, asking him how many ropes are required to moor the vessel in port, saying it is a maritime tradition that the master decides how to moor the ship.

Undecided, the commander says all the ropes, and laughter erupts on the ship in the port and across Belém. Realizing his mistake, Vasco takes refuge in a cheap boarding house, gets drunk on cachaça, and falls asleep deeply saddened and disappointed.

But that night the city of Belem endures the most violent storm that anyone has ever seen, leaving roofless houses, corpses, destroyed plantations, and a ruined port. All ships are damaged or drifting except for the ship of Captain Vasco Moscoso Aragão, which remains intact and durable, just as it docked.

The commander returns victorious to Periperi, honored by awards and acclaimed by all the newspapers; the citizens who had previously defamed him are now his most ardent fans. The dream of the commander can continue.
