= Navegação de cabotagem =

1992 memoir by Jorge Amado

- First edition
- Author: Jorge Amado
- Language: Portuguese
- Publisher: Editora Record
- Publication date: 1992; re-released 2012 by Companhia das Letras
- Publication place: Brazil
- Pages: 608
- ISBN: 9788535920772

Navegação de cabotagem: Apontamentos para um livro de memórias que jamais escreverei (Coastal navigation; Notes for a Memoir that I will never write) is a memoir by the Brazilian writer Jorge Amado.

== Contents ==
Navegação de cabotagem is not an autobiography, more of a series of recollections, which do not appear in any chronological order. The book was published to mark Amado’s 80th birthday in 1992. It covers his entire life, with the exception of his childhood, which he had earlier recorded in The Grapiuna Boy. Navegação de cabotagem contains memories from the mid-1920s onwards, including observations on his own works and on the television and film adaptations of these, with memories of his family and friends, as well as other writers and artists he had contact with. It describes experiences such binge drinking with the Chilean writer Pablo Neruda, and visits to a brothel or candomblé yard with the artist Carybé or the musician and painter Dorival Caymmi. Other recollections include meetings with Pablo Picasso, Mario Vargas Llosa, Gabriel García Márquez, and Jean-Paul Sartre. He examines his political views, including his disenchantment with communism as it turned to totalitarianism. His political activism, periods of exile and his work took him around the world many times and places he visited are also recalled, as well as the cities of Brazil.

== Title ==
The Portuguese title, Navegação de cabotagem, is a Brazilian expression referring to navigation between coastal and river ports in Brazil. It is often used to refer to smuggling and other illegal trade. The subtitle for the book, Notes for a memoir that I will never write refers to an agreement Amado had with Pablo Neruda and the Russian writer Ilya Ehrenburg to never write a memoir, which all three failed to honour although in the case of Neruda and Ehrenburg theirs were published posthumously.
