= Otto Lara Resende =

Brazilian journalist and writer

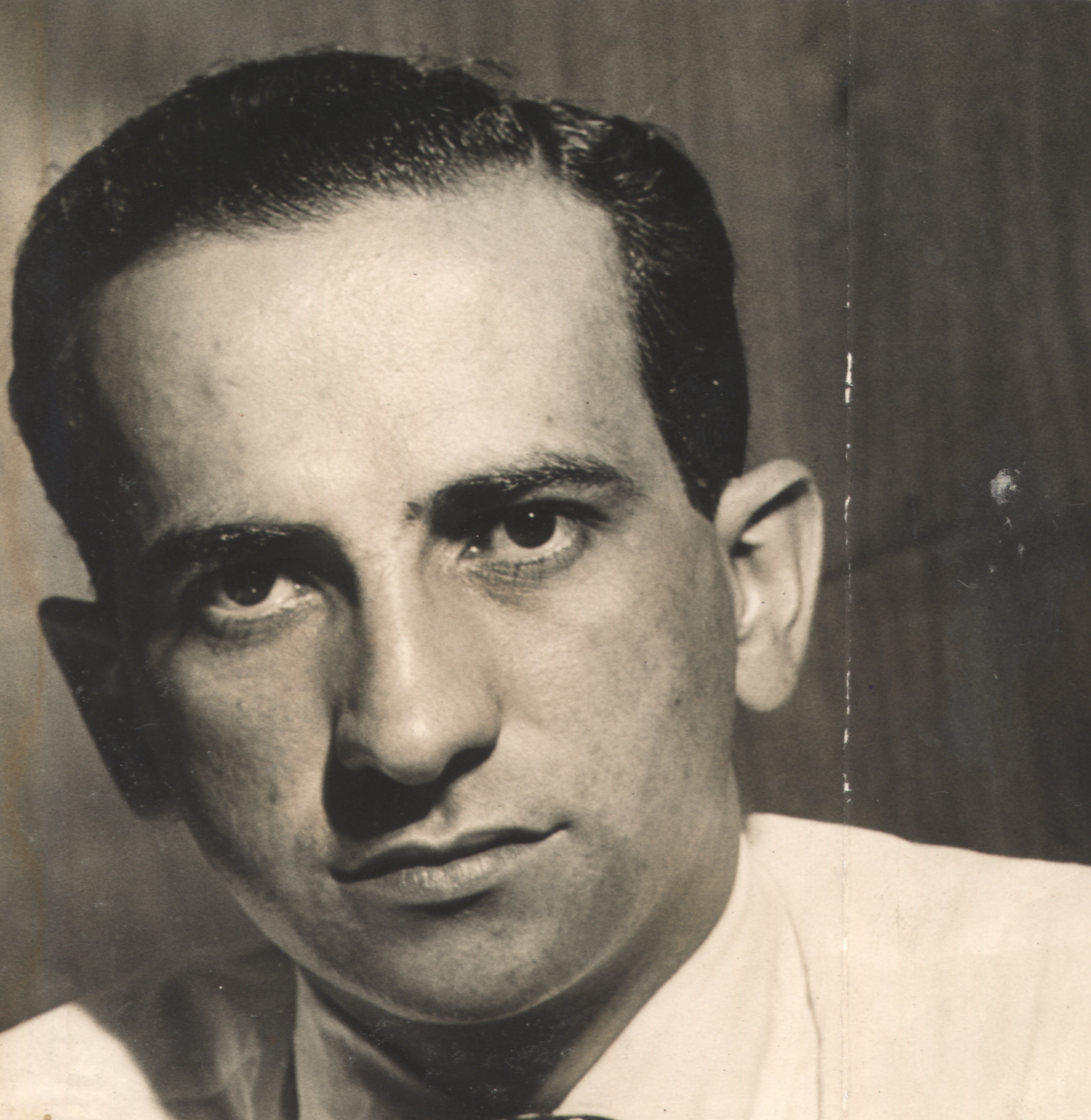
- Born: 1 May 1922; São João del Rei, Minas Gerais, Brazil
- Died: 28 December 1992 (aged 70); Rio de Janeiro, Brazil

Otto Lara Resende (1 May 1922 – 28 December 1992) was a Brazilian journalist and writer.

== Biography ==
Resende began teaching French at age fourteen and at eighteen years old began working as a journalist in the Belo Horizonte newspaper O Diário. In his career he worked at literary supplement of Diário de Minas. In Rio de Janeiro, Resende worked for the Diário de Notícias, O Globo, Diário Carioca, Correio da Manhã, Última Hora and Jornal do Brasil newspapers, Manchete and Senhor magazines, and TV Globo.

He graduated in law from the Federal University of Minas Gerais.

On 3 July 1979 Resende was elected to the Brazilian Academy of Letters, taking the chair 39, vacant by the death of Elmano Cardim.

== Works ==
- O lado humano (short stories, 1952)
- Boca do inferno (short stories, 1957 e 1998)
- O retrato na gaveta (short stories, 1962)
- O braço direito (novel, 1964)
- A cilada (short stories, 1965, published in "Os sete pecados capitais)
- As pompas do mundo (short stories, 1975)
- O elo partido e outras histórias (short stories, 1991)
- Bom dia para nascer (Columns at Folha de S. Paulo, 1993)
- O príncipe e o sabiá e outros perfis (História, 1994)
- A testemunha silenciosa (novellas, 1995).
