= Meritorious Citizen of the Freedom and Social Justice João Mangabeira =

Award in Bahia, Brazil

The Meritorious Citizen of the Freedom and Social Justice João Mangabeira decoration (Portuguese: Cidadão Benemérito da Liberdade e da Justiça Social João Mangabeira, CBJM) is the highest award granted by Legislative Assembly of Bahia. The title honors João Mangabeira, an outstanding in defense of democratic rule of law, great jurist and parliamentarian.

== History ==
The title was created under the Resolution 1.222, in 1993, and is the oldest one. The decoration is aimed to recognize Brazilians “dedicated to humanitarians and socials noble causes, which resulted in the political and socio-economic development of Brazil, significantly improving people´s life.” The first recipient was the Bahian communist politician Fernando Sant'Anna in 2005, during the celebration of his 90 years old. At the age of 44, the lawyer and professor Taurino Araujo is the youngest awarded.

Throughout its existence, the following notable Brazilians have earned the distinction:

- Carlos Alberto Dultra Cintra, former President of the Court of Justice of Bahia.
- Carlos Geraldo D'Andrea Espinheira, sociologist, writer and professor.
- Fernando dos Reis Sant'Anna, former constitutional federal deputy.
- Francisco Waldir Pires de Souza, former Governor of Bahia and Minister of Defence.
- Haroldo Borges Rodrigues Lima, former constitutional federal deputy, former President of the National Agency of Petroleum, Natural Gas and Biofuels (Brazil).
- João Carlos Cavalcanti de Castro, geologist and entrepreneur, discovered the deposit of iron ore in Caetité.
- José Renato Rabelo, National President of the PCdoB (Communist Party of Brazil).
- Jorge Amado, Brazilian writer.
- Taurino Araujo Neto, lawyer, writer and professor.
