= Shepherds of the Night =

Novel by the Brazilian writer Jorge Amado

- First edition
- Author: Jorge Amado
- Original title: Os Pastores da Noite
- Translator: Harriet De Onis
- Language: Portuguese
- Publisher: Livraria Martins Editora
- Publication date: 1964
- Publication place: Brazil
- English publication date: 1967 (Alfred Knopf)
- ISBN: 978-0380754717

Shepherds of the Night (Portuguese: Os Pastores da Noite) is a Brazilian novel. It was written by Jorge Amado in 1964 and published in English in 1967.

Shepherds of the Night is really three long, interrelated short stories, sharing many of the same characters as well as bringing in characters from earlier novels by Amado. The three stories concern the marriage of a playboy to a former prostitute; a Christening where the apparent godparents are actually stand-ins for the African gods in Bahia's syncretic religious culture; and the appropriation of land by the poor and their battles with the government to stay on the land. Amado tells all three with love of the people he is describing.

The second part of the novel, Ogum's Compadre, was adapted for a 1995 TV special on the Brazilian TV channel, Rede Globo, after which it was published as a book in its own right. In December 2002, Globo TV ran a four-episode TV version of Shepherds of the Night. The novel had earlier been adapted for film in 1975 by the French director Marcel Camus, appearing as Otalia de Bahia.
