= Sea of Death =

Novel by the Brazilian writer Jorge Amado, set in the city of Salvador da Bahia

- First edition
- Author: Jorge Amado
- Original title: Mar morto
- Translator: Gregory Rabassa
- Language: Portuguese
- Publisher: Livraria Jose Olympico Editora
- Publication date: 1936
- Publication place: Brazil
- English publication date: 1984 (Avon Books)
- ISBN: 0-380-75478-9

Sea of Death (Portuguese: Mar Morto) is a Brazilian Modernist novel written by Jorge Amado. Amado wrote the novel in response to his first arrest for "being a communist". The novel follows the lives of poor sailors around Bahia, and their relationship with the Afro-Brazilian religion Candomblé, especially the sea goddess Iemanjá. The novel's style and themes include many traits that characterize Amado's later work.

== Development and style ==
Sea of Death was written in 1936, the year that Jorge Amado was jailed for the first time, at the age of twenty-four, on charges of being a communist. He was arrested in Rio de Janeiro and spent two months in prison. On his release, he was invited by a British publisher, José Olympio, to produce a new novel. Sea of Death was begun in Salvador, Bahia, and completed in Rio de Janeiro. The novel won the Graça Aranha award from the Brazilian Academy of Letters in the same year.

Sea of Death was Jorge Amado’s fifth novel and the fifth of six novels he called his "Bahian Novels". He described Sea of Death as a "new vision of the life of the sailors of small sailing vessels on the waterfront of the state capital and the bay". It is one of his most poetically charged books. His translator, Gregory Rabassa, describes it as "sentimental, 'touching' and poetic". According to the critic Fábio Lucas, the novel’s poetic prose was to become a hallmark of the author’s work.

== Plot ==
Sea of Death tells stories of the dockside of Salvador, Bahia. The lives of the sailors of sloops in the bay from which Bahia gets its name are centred on the mythology surrounding the goddess Iemanjá, the "Queen of the Ocean" or the "Mother of Waters", are central to this novel, which portrays their daily struggle for survival. The novel features a variety of characters whose lives unfold around the story of two lovers, Guma and Lívia. They include the black Rufino and his mulatto lover Esmeralda; Francisco, Guma’s uncle, who mends nets; and the foul-mouthed Rosa Palmeirão.
