= The Two Deaths of Quincas Wateryell =

Novel by the Brazilian writer Jorge Amado

- First English-language edition
- Author: Jorge Amado
- Original title: A Morte e a Morte de Quincas Berro d'Água
- Translator: Barbara Shelby
- Language: Portuguese
- Genre: Crime, Regionalism
- Publication date: 1959
- Publication place: Brazil
- English publication date: 1965, Alfred A. Knopf
- Media type: Print (Hardback & Paperback)
- Pages: 97 pp (paperback edition)
- ISBN: 0-380-75476-2 (paperback edition)
- OCLC: 23444229

The Two Deaths of Quincas Wateryell (A Morte e a Morte de Quincas Berro d'Água) is a 1959 Brazilian modernist novella by Jorge Amado. It was first published in the Brazilian magazine Senhor. In 2012, it was republished in English as The Double Death of Quincas Water-Bray.

== Plot summary ==
The book is about what happens after Quincas Wateryell, a popular bum who lives in the slums of Salvador, Bahia, is found dead one morning. Two groups of people compete over Quincas's memory: his new friends and his old family. To his family, led by his daughter Vanda, Quincas Wateryell is Joaquim Soares da Cunha, formerly an "exemplary employee of the State Rent Board." According to Vanda, her father disgraced the family by walking out on them, calling Vanda and her mother Dona Otacilia "vipers" and Vanda's husband Leonardo a "silly ass." Despite all their efforts to hide what really happened, Joaquim Soares da Cunha became Quincas, "vagabond king of the honky-tonks" and "patriarch of the prostitutes." Leonardo attempts to hide it from his coworkers, and Vanda tries to keep it from her friends, but they cannot ignore the reputation that Joaquim Soares da Cunha has earned in the local press as Quincas Wateryell.

Now, Vanda, Leonardo, and Quincas's sister Aunt Marocas and brother Eduardo, must tend to the body and give it a proper burial, without attracting too much attention to Quincas and his past. They settle on a simple suit and shoes, but no underwear, because no one will ever see that, and order a casket and candles fit for a church. That night they gather around the casket to keep watch over Quincas, each trying to ignore his leering smile, which reminds them of how much he despised them. Gradually, they go home, leaving Quincas to be watched by his friends from the slum.

The cold reception that the news of Quincas's death is received by his family is juxtaposed by the way his friends from the slum receive the same news. His closest friends are Curió, a store barker in Shoemaker's Hollow, who paints his face like a clown to attract people; Bangs, a towering black man who makes his living as a card sharp; Private Martim, a soldier who had been discharged from the army who lived off the generosity of the women he was frequently engaged to; and Breezy, who supported himself catching frogs and selling them to medical researchers for experiments. The four men lead the neighborhood in mourning for Quincas, wailing "Daddy's gone!"

That evening, the friends come to pay their last respects and end up taking care of the body after the family leaves. They recall the impact that Quincas had on their lives, and remember how he got his curious nickname: once, after taking a swig from a bottle of what he thought was alcohol, he spat it out and roared: "Waaaaaaater!" They all sob for Quincas, and Private Martim worries about how he will now take care of Quitéria, a prostitute who was Quincas's girlfriend.

Left alone at night with the body, the four of them get Quincas to participate in one last party, telling him jokes serving him liquor, and making a gift of a beautiful frog that Breezy had just caught. They then decide to take Quincas on one last trip to the docks to share Cap'n Manuel's delicious fish stew that was Quincas's favorite. On their way to the dock, they pick up a group of prostitutes, including Quitéria, so she can have one last fling with the dead man.

Quincas always loved the sea, and after the friends feed him the stew, they take him on board Cap'n Manuel's boat for a fishing excursion. Suddenly a storm tosses the boat, and they rush for shore, but Quincas's body is tossed overboard. It is a fitting end for Quincas, who once made a "solemn oath" that the sea "would be the only witness to his final hour."

== Major themes ==
The short book is a searing indictment of class-ridden Brazilian society in the mid-twentieth century and a touching account of the bonds of true friendship, contrasted with family obligations.

== Adaptations ==
The 1989 comedy film Weekend at Bernie's (directed by Ted Kotcheff and written by Robert Klane) and its 1993 sequel Weekend at Bernie's II (written and directed by Klane) have a similar plot, with the protagonists of the films dealing with a corpse in the same way those of the novella do. In 1998, the story was adapted as an Egyptian independent film entitled Gannet el Shayateen, directed by Osama Fawzy. It won numerous national and international prizes. In 2010, a Brazilian film version, Quincas Berro d'Água, was made, both films taking additional inspiration from the American Weekend at Bernie's films.
