= The ABC of Castro Alves =

Biography by the Brazilian writer Jorge Amado

- First edition
- Author: Jorge Amado
- Original title: ABC de Castro Alves
- Language: Portuguese
- Publisher: Livraria Martins Editora, São Paulo, republished by Companhia das Letras, 2010.
- Publication date: 1941
- Publication place: Brazil
- ISBN: 978-85-359-1659-1

The ABC of Castro Alves (Portuguese: ABC de Castro Alves) is a biography of Brazilian poet Castro Alves written by Jorge Amado and first published in 1941. There is no English version.

== Summary ==
Antônio Frederico de Castro Alves was a Brazilian poet and playwright, famous for his abolitionist and republican poems. He was known as the poet of the slaves. During his childhood, spent in what is now the town of Castro Alves, and in the state capital, Salvador, he discovered the importance of struggle from his campaigning uncle.

In writing the biography, Amado exhibits what has been called "devout admiration" for the poet, who is seen as the "romantic champion of the slave emancipation movement". The biography records the most important times of the poet’s short life, such as his discovery of the writings of Byron and Victor Hugo, his affair with the actress Eugênia Câmara, his studies in law in Recife and São Paulo, his campaigning alongside Ruy Barbosa and Joaquim Nabuco, as well as his death from tuberculosis at the age of 24. The text is accompanied by poems of Castro Alves that Amado brings into the biography.
