= Sônia Braga =

Brazilian actress

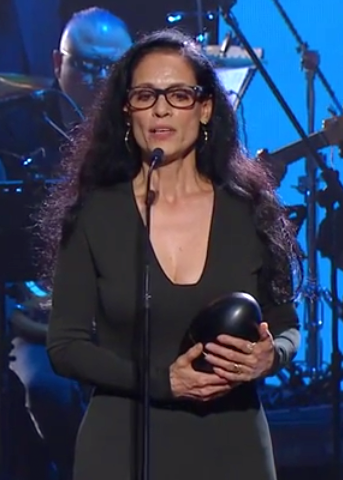
- Braga in 2016
- Born: Sônia Maria Campos Braga; 8 June 1950 (age 76); Maringá, Paraná, Brazil
- Citizenship: Brazil; United States
- Occupation: Actress
- Years active: 1967–present
- Spouses: Arduíno Colassanti (m. 1970; sep. 1976) Antônio Guerreiro (m. 1980; div. 1988)
- Relatives: Alice Braga (niece)

Sônia Maria Campos Braga (Brazilian Portuguese: [ˈsonjɐ maˈɾi.ɐ ˈkɐ̃puz ˈbɾaɡɐ]; born 8 June 1950) is a Brazilian actress. She is known in the English-speaking world for her Golden Globe Award–nominated performances in Kiss of the Spider Woman (1985) and Moon over Parador (1988). She also received a BAFTA Award nomination in 1981 for Dona Flor and Her Two Husbands (first released in 1976). For the 1994 television film The Burning Season, she was nominated for an Emmy Award and a third Golden Globe Award. Her other television and film credits include The Cosby Show (1986), The Milagro Beanfield War (1988), The Rookie (1990), Angel Eyes (2001), Sex and the City (2001), American Family (2002), Alias (2005), Aquarius (2016), Bacurau (2019), and Fatima (2020). In 2020, The New York Times ranked her #24 in its list of the 25 Greatest Actors of the 21st Century.

== Early life, family and education ==
Sônia Braga was born on June 8, 1950, She is daughter of Hélio Fernando Ferraz Braga and Maria Braga Jaci Campos, a costume designer from Maringá. Sônia's siblings are Júlio, Ana, Hélio, and Maria. Sônia is the aunt of Alice Braga, an actress. Her parents and her four siblings moved to Curitiba and then to Campinas, São Paulo. When Braga was 8 years old, her father died, and she attended a convent school in São Paulo.

== Career ==
=== Early career and television debut (1960s) ===
In her teens, she took a job as a receptionist and typist at Buffet Torres, a wedding reception and event catering company in São Paulo.

Her brother Hélio presented the TV Tupi children's show Jardim Encantado. At age 14, Braga was invited by director Vicente Sesso to play small roles in children's programs and teleteatros on TV Tupi, including Jardim Encantado. Braga then joined a theater group in Santo André, in the ABC region. At 17, she debuted in the play George Dandin in Santo André.

In 1968, she was cast in the first Brazilian production of the musical Hair. She was turned down at first by director Ademar Guerra, but at the insistence of producer/actor Altair Lima, she joined Antônio Fagundes, Ney Latorraca, and the rest of the cast. Despite the dictatorship in Brazil having promulgated Institutional Act No. 5, which imposed widespread censorship, the musical ran for three years.

It has become popularized that in 1977, Caetano Veloso wrote the song Tigresa in tribute to her, since the line “She tells me she was an actress and worked on Hair" match with her story, but the songwriter as herself told in many interviews that actually was wrote for another actress, Zezé Motta.

In 1968, Braga was in the film O Bandido da Luz Vermelha. In 1969, she was invited to perform in A Menina do Veleiro Azul, a soap opera produced by TV Excelsior, but the network closed before the program aired.

=== Breakthrough and national stardom (1970s) ===
In 1970, Braga was invited to join the cast of Irmãos Coragem, a soap opera written by Janete Clair, which aired on Rede Globo. Also in the early 1970s, she appeared in supporting roles in the films A Moreninha and Cléo e Daniel. Despite the success on stage and acting in soap operas, it was in the children's television series Vila Sésamo, broadcast in 1972, that Braga became a household name.

In 1975, Braga starred in the telenovela Gabriela, an adaptation of Jorge Amado's novel Gabriela, Clove and Cinnamon. Directed by Walter Avancini, the soap opera was a great national and international success, establishing her as a sex symbol. Braga returned to embody another Jorge Amado character, starring in the 1976 film Dona Flor and Her Two Husbands directed by Bruno Barreto, alongside José Wilker and Mauro Mendonça. The romantic comedy was a box office hit in Brazilian cinemas and also received major recognition internationally. In 1983, she starred in the film Gabriela, alongside Marcello Mastroianni.

In 1976, Braga participated in the cast of Saramandaia. The following year she starred in Espelho Mágico as Cynthia Levy. One of the highlights of the soundtrack of the soap opera is the cover version that Gal Costa recorded of Tigresa, song themed of her character and wrongly popularized that was made for her. In the late 1970s, Braga gave life to another renowned character in Brazilian television, Julia Matos in Dancin' Days (1978). In the storyline, Braga played an ex-convict who gets out of prison ready to win back the love of her daughter, played by Gloria Pires. In 1979, Braga performed in children's theater in the play No País dos Prequetés. The following year she returned to television in the telenovela Chega Mais alongside Tony Ramos.

=== International crossover and Hollywood career (1980s–1990s) ===
In the early 1980s, Braga, who had already made films like Lady on the Bus (1978), decided to devote herself exclusively to the movies. In 1981, she starred in Eu Te Amo directed by Arnaldo Jabor, and won the best actress award at the Gramado Film Festival. She starred in the movie Kiss of the Spider Woman (1985) alongside William Hurt and Raul Julia. Her role led to a Golden Globe nomination for best supporting actress and its success led to her international work.In 1987, she was the first Brazilian to present a category at the Oscars. She was announced by Goldie Hawn as one of the most glamorous actresses in the world, before appearing with Michael Douglas, who announced the result of the best short film. She received her second Golden Globe nomination for best supporting actress for her performance in the film Moon over Parador (1988) alongside Raul Julia and Richard Dreyfuss. That same year, she appeared in Robert Redford's The Milagro Beanfield War. In 1990, she appeared in Clint Eastwood's action film The Rookie. She also appeared in American television series, such as the strict teacher Mrs. Westlake in two episodes of The Cosby Show and medical researcher Sophie Wagner in an episode of Tales from the Crypt.

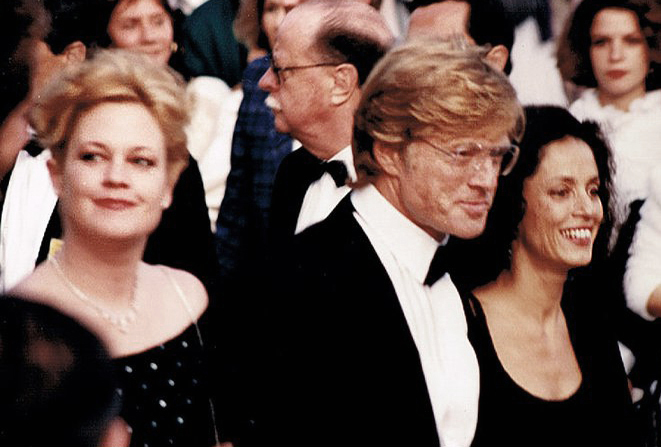
Melanie Griffith, Robert Redford and Braga, promoting The Milagro Beanfield War at the Cannes Film Festival in 1988

Braga decided to leave Brazil for a career in the United States, where she lived for 14 years. In 2003, she obtained American citizenship. Braga competed for many prestigious awards in the United States. For her performance in The Burning Season (1994), she was nominated for the third time for the Golden Globe for best supporting actress. In 1995, she was nominated for an Emmy Award for Best Supporting Actress in a Miniseries or a Movie for The Burning Season, but lost to Shirley Knight. The film details the life of Brazilian activist Chico Mendes. In 1996, she won the Lone Star Film & Television Award for best supporting actress for her work in Streets of Laredo directed by Joseph Sargent. That same year, director Nicolas Roeg offered her the lead role in the film Two Deaths alongside Patrick Malahide. Braga also had the lead in Tieta of Agreste (1996), directed by Carlos Diegues.

=== Return to Brazil and contemporary projects (1999–present) ===
In 1999, after nearly 20 years away from Brazilian television, the actress made a cameo in the first 15 chapters of the soap opera Força de um Desejo (1999), by Gilberto Braga and Alcides Nogueira, in the role of Helena Silveira, mother of characters Fábio Assunção and Selton Mello. In 2001, she joined the cast of Memórias Póstumas directed by André Klotzel, based on The Posthumous Memoirs of Bras Cubas by Machado de Assis. For her performance in this film, she won the Kikito award for best supporting actress at the Gramado Film Festival.

In 2001, Braga appeared in Angel Eyes, a romantic drama film directed by Luis Mandoki and starring Jennifer Lopez. That same year, she had a recurring role as Maria Diega Reyes in the television series Sex and the City. In 2002, she appeared in American Family, a PBS series created by Gregory Nava that follows the lives of a Latino family in Los Angeles, and in the crime film Empire. In 2005, she had a recurring role in the series Alias. She also guest-starred in episodes of series including George Lopez, Law & Order, CSI: Miami, Ghost Whisperer, and Brothers and Sisters among others. In 2006, she returned to work in Globo's telenovela Páginas da Vida, playing sculptor Tônia. In 2010, she starred in the episode "A Adultera da Urca" of the miniseries As Cariocas, and in 2011, made a cameo in Tapas & Beijos.

Braga had a recurring role as Lorraine Correia in the sixth season of the series Royal Pains. Braga's scenes were filmed on location in Mexico and her episodes were aired in August 2014. In 2016, she appeared in Netflix's Marvel Netflix series Luke Cage as Rosario Dawson's mother.

Braga received positive reviews for her film Aquarius when it premiered at the 2016 Cannes Film Festival. Braga plays a widow and retired music writer who lives in the titular apartment complex and refuses to leave when developers offer her a buy-out. Though the film did not earn an Oscar nomination for Braga, it did contend for Best Foreign Film at France's Cesar Awards and the Independent Spirit Awards. She ranked in the top five in IndieWire's 2016 critics' poll for Academy Award for Best Actress. She also appeared in the films Wonder (2017), Bacurau (2019), Fatima (2020), and The First Omen (2024). In 2020, The New York Times ranked her #24 in its list of the 25 Greatest Actors of the 21st Century.

== Personal life ==
Braga is a naturalized American, living since 1990 in New York City, while also having two homes in Brazil, an apartment in Rio de Janeiro and a beach house in Niterói.

Braga was married twice: first to fellow actor Arduíno Colassanti from 1970 to 1976, and then to photographer Antônio Guerreiro from 1980 to 1988.

During the 1980s, Braga also had a relationship with actor Robert Redford, She then had a relationship with Pat Metheny, and with singer Caetano Veloso, who wrote "Trem das Cores" based on her.

In August 2016, Braga revealed in an interview with the Brazilian Elle that she never intended to have children due to professional ambitions. She underwent four abortions, the first after her first sexual relationship at the age of 17; which led to a severe hemorrhage followed by a uterine infection that nearly killed her.

== Filmography ==
=== Film ===
Year	Film	Role	Notes
1968	The Red Light Bandit	Victim	
1970	Cleo e Daniel	Sandra	
1970	A Moreninha	Carolina	
1971	O Capitão Bandeira Contra o Dr. Moura Brasil	Boy	
1973	Mestiça, a Escrava Indomável	Mestiça	
1975	O Casal	Maria Lúcia	
1976	Dona Flor and Her Two Husbands	Dona Flor (Florípides) Guimarães	
1978	Lady on the Bus	Solange	
1981	I Love You	Maria	
1983	Gabriela, Cravo e Canela	Gabriela	
1985	Kiss of the Spider Woman	Leni Lamaison / Marta / Spider Woman	
1988	The Milagro Beanfield War	Ruby Archuleta	
1988	Moon over Parador	Madonna Mendez	
1990	The Rookie	Liesl	
1993	Roosters	Juana Morales	
1994	The Burning Season	Regina de Carvalho	
1995	Two Deaths	Ana Puscasu	
1996	Tieta do Agreste	Tieta	
1999	From Dusk Till Dawn 3: The Hangman's Daughter	Quixtla	
2001	Perfume	Irene Mancini	
2001	Memórias Póstumas	Marcela	
2001	Angel Eyes	Josephine Pogue	
2002	Empire	Iris	
2003	Testosterone	Mrs. Alesandro	
2004	Amália Traïda	Amália Rodrigues	Short
2004	Scene Stealers	Celia Crouch	
2005	Che Guevara	Celia	
2005	Marilyn Hotchkiss' Ballroom Dancing and Charm School	Tina	
2006	Sea of Dreams	Nurka	
2006	Bordertown	Teresa Casillas	
2006	The Hottest State	Mrs. Garcia	
2010	An Invisible Sign	Mom	
2010	Lope	Paquita	
2012	The Wine of Summer	Eliza	
2013	Emoticon ;)	Sonia	
2016	Aquarius	Dona Clara	
2017	Wonder	Lisa "Grans" Minel	
2019	Bacurau	Domingas	
2019	The Jesus Rolls	Mother	
2020	Fatima	Sister Lúcia	
2022	Shotgun Wedding	Renata Ortiz	
2024	The First Omen	Silvia	

=== Television ===
Year	Title	Role	Notes
1969	A Menina do Veleiro Azul		Telenovela
1970	Irmãos Coragem	Lídia Siqueira	Telenovela
1972	Vila Sésamo	Ana Maria	Brazilian TV series
1972	Selva de Pedra	Flávia	Telenovela
1972	Somos Todos do Jardim de Infância		TV movie
1974	Fogo sobre Terra	Brisa	Telenovela
1975	Gabriela	Gabriela	Telenovela
1976	Saramandaia	Marcina	Telenovela
1977	Espelho Mágico	Camila/Cinthia Levy	Telenovela
1978	Dancin' Days	Júlia de Souza Matos	Telenovela
1980	Chega Mais	Gelly	Telenovela
1986	The Cosby Show	Anna Maria Westlake	2 episodes
1987	The Man Who Broke 1,000 Chains	Emily Del Pino Pacheco	TV movie
1991	The Last Prostitute	Loah	TV movie
1992	Tales from the Crypt	Sophie Wagner	1 episode: ("This'll Kill Ya")
1994	The Burning Season	Regina de Carvalho	TV movie
1995	Streets of Laredo	Maria Garza	Miniseries
1995	Moses	Sephora	TV movie
1998	Money Play$	Irene	TV movie
1998	Four Corners	Carlota Alvarez	
1998	A Will of Their Own	Jessie Lopez De La Cruz	Miniseries
1999	Força de um Desejo	Baroness Helena Menezes de Albuquerque Silveira Sobral	Telenovela
2000	Family Law	Beatrice Valdez	1 episode: ("Echoes")
2001	The Judge	Lily Acosta	TV movie
2001	Sex and the City	Maria Diega Reyes	3 episodes
2002	American Family	Berta Gonzalez	11 episodes
2002	George Lopez	Emilina Palmero	1 episode: ("Meet the Cuban Parents")
2003	Law & Order	Helen	1 episode: ("Genius")
2005	CSI: Miami	Dona Marta Cruz	1 episode: ("Identity")
2005	Alias	Elena Derevko / Sophia Vargas	5 episodes
2005	Ghost Whisperer	Estella de la Costa	1 episode: ("Shadow Boxer")
2006	Páginas da Vida	Tônia (Antônia Werneck)	Telenovela
2007	Donas de Casa Desesperadas	Alice Monteiro	Brazilian TV series
2010	As Cariocas	Julia	1 episode: ("A Adúltera da Urca")
2010	Brothers and Sisters	Gabriela	2 episodes
2011	Tapas & Beijos	Helô Siqueira	Episode: ("A Bolsa do Camelô")
2013	Meddling Mom	Carmen Vega	TV movie
2014	Royal Pains	Lorena Correia	Season 6
2014	Warehouse 13	Alicia	Season 5, Episode 4 ("Savage Seduction")
2016	Luke Cage	Soledad Temple	Netflix series
