= The Violent Land =

Novel by the Brazilian writer Jorge Amado

- First English-language edition
- Author: Jorge Amado
- Original title: Terras do Sem Fim
- Translator: Samuel Putnam
- Cover artist: Harry Roth
- Language: Portuguese
- Publication date: 1943
- Publication place: Brazil
- English publication date: 1945, Alfred A. Knopf
- Pages: 333

The Violent Land (Portuguese: Terras do Sem Fim) is a Brazilian Modernist novel written by Jorge Amado in 1943 and published in English in 1945. It describes the battles to develop cacao plantations in the forests of the Bahia state of Brazil. Amado wrote that "No other of my books. . . is as dear to me as The Violent Land, in it lie my roots; it is from the blood from which I was created; it contains the gunfire that resounded during my early infancy", and suggested that the novel belongs to a distinct Brazilian "literature of cacao". By 1965, the book had been adapted as a film, as well as for the stage, television and radio.

== Background ==
The Violent Land was written when Jorge Amado was thirty-one and, as a communist, had gone into exile in Uruguay. It is set in the cocoa or cacao-growing areas of the state of Bahia and draws heavily on Amado's own personal experiences as a son of a cocoa planter, as did several of his earlier novels. Amado was born in Ilhéus, the port from which much of Brazil's cocoa was exported. As Alfred MacAdam notes in his introduction to the 2013 Penguin edition, the battles between cocoa planters that he records "will inevitably remind today's readers of the warfare between drug cartels in any number of Latin American countries." The novel recounts the warfare between cocoa 'colonels', the large plantation owners seeking to achieve dominance over a wide area. Ambushes, legal chicanery, stealing plantations and taking possession of virgin forest are all methods employed to achieve this dominance. As Amado points out in the 1965 preface, the cocoa lands "were fertilized with blood. They were barbarous lands, where banditry and death, implacable hatred and the cruellest revenge flourished." He goes on to describe gun battles he witnessed and tells us that his father was wounded in one such battle.

== Plot ==
The two most important planters are Colonel Horacio da Silveira and Colonel Sinhô Badaró. Between their lands lies a large area of virgin forest, which both men have long coveted. Among the numerous people who head to the region in search of wealth are several who come to support one side or the other. Dr. Virgilio Cabral, a lawyer, becomes an ally of da Silveira. Another is Captain João Magalhães, a professional gambler and an opportunist. Among his admirers is Dona Ana Badaró, the colonel's daughter, who is also the heir to the family fortune.

Cabral falls in love with Ester, da Silveira's beautiful wife. They know that they will both be killed if the husband finds them out. Cabral is professionally successful, for he finds an old survey of the contested land and registers the title in da Silveira's name. The Badaró family and its supporters retaliate by burning the registry office and all the records. They then hire Magalhães to do a survey for them, even though he knows nothing about surveying. This leads da Silveira to form alliances with other, smaller landholders and eventually emerge victorious after many battles.
