= Cacau (novel) =

1933 Brazilian novel by Jorge Amado

- First edition of Cacau
- Author: Jorge Amado
- Language: Portuguese
- Genre: Fiction
- Set in: Ilhéus, Brazil
- Publisher: Ariel Publishing House
- Publication date: 1933
- Publication place: Brazil

Cacau (trans. Cocoa) is a Brazilian social realism novel written by Jorge Amado.

It was written by Jorge Amado in 1933 and was his second novel, forming together with Suor the beginning of the development of Amado's project of a Proletarian novel, that would communicate the basics of communist thought.

It was published in 1933 by the Ariel Publishing House in Rio de Janeiro.

== Background ==
The book had considerable autobiographical elements. Amado, twenty-one years old at the time of writing, had in his earlier life considerable direct contact with the hard life of the laborers in the cocoa plantations, and his experience formed the basis for this novel. Unlike in his first novel, the present one is written in the first person.

Reflecting the author's political development, the book expresses Socialist ideas and promotes workers' organizing for class struggle - specifically, in the harsh and exploitive world of the cocoa plantations. Cacau ends with the hero renouncing the opportunity to marry the landowner’s daughter and, instead, setting off to join the class struggle in Rio de Janeiro.

== Plot ==
The book tells the story of a Sergipano (inhabitant of Sergipe), who arrives in Ilhéus in search of work. He suffers long hunger and is apprehensive of the city until encountering a good-hearted guard named Roberto in front of a big bakery, who gives him some bread. Later on the same day he encounters Roberto again, gets invited to a canteen to eat a feijoada and there meets several men sitting at the back. He is presented to one of them, nicknamed "The '98", who in turn introduces the protagonist to a Colonel Misael, involved in recruiting men to work on the cocoa plantations. With the money that these two new friends give him, the young man manages to catch the train to Pirangi and, after a long journey and numerous events described in detail, he arrives at his destination. There, he embarks on the course of hard work and befriends the carpenter Colodino, as well as fellow workers João Grilo, Antonio Barriguinha and Honório, who are mostly Blacks or Mulattos.

But there is not only work. On days of rest the protagonist and his friends drink a lot, especially cachaça, frequent the brothels, working men's club, and gambling dens. Many of the characters would also play an important roles in later works of Amado. Ultimately, they develop an increasing class consciousness and start becoming politically involved. This, again, is a highly autobiographical element paralleling Amado's own life.

== Reception ==
The first edition of 2,000 copies sold out in 40 days.

It was published the same year as Serafim Ponte Grande by Oswald de Andrade. Due to the fashion of the "proletarian novel" both Cacau by Jorge Amado and Os Corumbas by Amando Fontes were bestsellers that year. Pagu's Parque Industrial, published also in 1933, did not share the same luck.

Alberto Passos Guimarães was the book's first published critic: an avowed communist, his judgement of value was based on how much the novel was a proper "Proletarian novel", and in his judgement it largely does.
