= Gabriela, Clove and Cinnamon =

1958 novel by Jorge Amado

- First edition; cover art by Clóvis Graciano
- Author: Jorge Amado
- Original title: Gabriela, Cravo e Canela
- Cover artist: Clóvis Graciano
- Language: Portuguese
- Genre: Historical fiction
- Publisher: Livraria Martins Editora (first edition), Alfred A. Knopf
- Publication date: 1958
- Publication place: Brazil
- English publication date: 1962
- Media type: Print
- Pages: 453
- ISBN: 9780307276650
- OCLC: 879808914

Gabriela, Clove and Cinnamon (Portuguese: Gabriela, Cravo e Canela) is a Brazilian modernist novel by Jorge Amado, originally published in 1958 and later published in English in 1962. It is widely considered one of Amado's finest works. A film adaptation, Gabriela, was released in 1983.

It is Jorge Amado 3rd most bestselling book, having sold 2 million copies.

== Plot summary ==
Gabriela, Clove and Cinnamon is a romantic tale set in the small Brazilian town of Ilhéus during the 1920s. The town is experiencing a record large cacao crop, which makes it a thriving place and gives it an economic upswing and great progress. Still there is a conservative streak among the town folk and they are still relying on old traditions, like violent political takeovers and vengeance against unfaithful women. The book tells two separate but related tales: first, the romance between Nacib Saad, a respectable bar owner of Syrian origin, and his new cook Gabriela, an innocent and captivating migrant worker from the impoverished interior. The gap between the worlds of Nacib Saad and Gabriela make their romance a challenge to the unwritten rules of Ilhéus society and will subsequently change the two of them forever.

The second part to this story is about the political struggle between the seasoned cacao plantation owners, with the powerful Bastos clan in pole position, and the forces of modernization, in the person of Mundinho Falcão, a wealthy young man from Rio de Janeiro. It can be read simultaneously as an unusual, charming love story, a description of the political and social forces at work in 1920s Brazil, a somewhat satirical depiction of Latin American aspirations to "modernity", and a celebration of the local culture and pleasures of Bahia.

== Theme and settings ==
Gabriela, Clove and Cinnamon gives the reader a peek into a small town community on the brink of a grand transformation. Ilhéus is an inviting little place with a good mix of culture and quite a few originals to color everyday life. In the mid-1920s, the Brazilian provinces were suffering under the political, social, and economic dominance of the cacao plantation owners – the "colonels" (Portuguese: coronéis). They sit at the very top of the societal structure and control the region, having the absolute majority of the political power. In this story though, there is a new kid in town, Mundinho Falcão, a man who recently moved to Ilhéus from Rio de Janeiro. He has a sole purpose: to seize the political power from these "colonels". The town patriarch, Colonel Ramiro Bastos, disapproves of the outsider's interference and vows not to surrender without a fight.

The colonels run the local governing administration of both major political parties, thus control all decisionmaking and with violence if necessary hold on to their large estates that supply the means upon which everything and everyone depends. They are the plutocratic rulers of what could be called a purely feudal society, aided by complicated system of allegiances built upon mutual interest, reciprocal favors and kinship.

== Translations ==
It is the book by Jorge Amado with the most translations. It was edited in German, Arabic, Bulgarian, Catalan, Croatian, Danish, Slovak, Slovene, Spanish, Estonian, Finnish, French, Georgian, Greek, Hebrew, Dutch, Hungarian, English, Italian, Lithuanian, Macedonian, Moldavian, Norwegian, Persian, Polish, Romanian, Russian, Swedish, Czech, Turkish and Ukrainian.

In China, where Jorge Amado is the most read Brazilian author, this book and Dona Flor and Her Two Husbands are considered the best books by Jorge Amado.

== Adaptations ==
The novel was made into the telenovela Gabriela, Cravo e Canela for TV Tupi in 1961. It was also adapted into the 1975 telenovela Gabriela and into the 2012 telenovela Gabriela.

The feature film Gabriela was directed by Bruno Barreto in 1983. The feature version starred Sônia Braga as Gabriela and Marcello Mastroianni as Nacib, and featured original music by Antonio Carlos Jobim.

The book has been translated into English and other languages as Gabriela, Clove and Cinnamon.
