= The Knight of Hope =

1942 biography of Luis Carlos Prestes by Jorge Amado

First edition (publ. Livraria Martins Editora)

The Knight of Hope or The Life of Luis Carlos Prestes (Portuguese: O Cavaleiro da Esperança ou Vida de Luis Carlos Prestes) is a 1942 book by Jorge Amado, a biography of the well-known Brazilian revolutionary Luis Carlos Prestes. It has not been published in English.

The Knight of Hope salutes the heroism of Prestes. In 1924 he set out on a 25,000 kilometer march that became known as the Prestes Column. In 1935 he founded the National Liberation Alliance and led the so-called "Communist Conspiracy". He was imprisoned in 1936 by the Getúlio Vargas dictatorship, along with his pregnant wife. The book expresses considerable support for Prestes's positions and indeed admiration for his person. As Amado observed, the book was written “with passion, about someone who is loved”. However, one critic has argued that Amado’s estimate of the significance of Prestes is somewhat exaggerated, while admitting that the biography "is useful testimony to the relation between art and political life".

Amado himself suffered censorship and political persecution under Brazil’s Estado Novo regime (1937–45). He was imprisoned in both 1936 and 1937, accused of being a Communist and a subversive. In 1937, copies of his various works were burned in a public square in Salvador along with those of others. He decided to write Prestes’ biography in 1941 to campaign for the release of the revolutionary leader, who was still in prison. The book was written in Buenos Aires and published in the Spanish language in 1942. Copies were only available on the black market in Brazil, and the text circulated in secret. The Argentine edition was later banned.

The first Brazilian edition was published in 1945, but disappeared from bookstores after the military coup of 1964. The next edition was not published until 1979. Throughout the biography Jorge Amado addresses an imaginary female reader, showing his intention to speak directly to the Brazilian people, encouraging them to support democracy and liberty.
