= Captains of the Sands =

1937 novel by Jorge Amado

- First edition
- Author: Jorge Amado
- Original title: Capitães da areia
- Translator: Gregory Rabassa
- Cover artist: Kristen Haff
- Language: Portuguese
- Publisher: Livraria Jose Olympico Editora
- Publication date: 1937
- Publication place: Brazil
- English publication date: 1988
- ISBN: 978-0-14-310635-7

Captains of the Sands (Portuguese: Capitães da Areia) is a Brazilian novel written by Jorge Amado in 1937.

The novel tells of a gang of street children. Their ages range from seven to sixteen and they live by begging, gambling, stealing and burglary in the streets of Salvador, Bahia, Brazil. The protagonist is Pedro Bala, the leader of the gang, and other important characters include the Professor, Boa-Vida, Barandão, João Grande and Sem-Pernas.

Critics have tended to dismiss Amado's earlier works, such as Captains of the Sands, as being political rather than literary and for incorporating popular culture, such as Candomblé and Malandragem. In response, Amado said that he set out to tell a story to be enjoyed by all, not to please critics, and to show solidarity with the humanity portrayed in the books.

Amado was a member of the Brazilian Communist Party at the time he wrote it, and the book belongs to the Socialist realism movement in vogue at the time also known as the "30s generation" (Geração de 30).

In the year of publication 808 copies were burnt in a square in Salvador, together with works of other authors, under the rationale that they were communist propaganda. But afterwards the book would be widely acclaimed, selling 4.3 million copies and being Jorge Amado's single best-selling book.

In a postface to the book, Amado wrote that this was the sixth and final work in the cycle he called "The Bahian Novels" in which he had tried to set down the "life, the customs, the language of my State".

== Film & TV ==
The book inspired the 1971 American film The Sandpit Generals and the 2011 Brazilian film Capitães da Areia. The latter was directed and co-produced by Cecília Amado, who is Jorge Amado's granddaughter.

The 1989 Brazilian TV series Capitães da Areia was also based on the book.
