= Dona Flor and Her Two Husbands (novel) =

Novel by the Brazilian writer Jorge Amado

- Cover of the first edition
- Author: Jorge Amado
- Original title: Dona Flor e Seus Dois Maridos
- Translator: Harriet de Onís
- Language: Portuguese
- Publisher: Livraria Martins Editora
- Publication date: 1966
- Publication place: Brazil
- English publication date: 1969 (Avon Books)

Dona Flor and Her Two Husbands (Portuguese: Dona Flor e Seus Dois Maridos) is a novel by Brazilian writer Jorge Amado, published in 1966; it was translated into English by Harriet de Onís in 1969. The novel was adapted for the first time into the 1976 film Dona Flor and Her Two Husbands.

== Plot ==
The novel, set in Salvador, Bahia, opens with the sudden death of Dona Flor's husband, Vadinho, who collapses in the midst of Carnival celebrations. He is dancing a samba in the streets when his heart gives out, a surprise to all as Vadinho had spent his entire life gambling, partying and drinking with no hint of problems. His nights on the town and his two-timing had been supported by sponging off Dona Flor, the owner of a successful cooking school and his demands for money had been a constant worry and cause of sleepless nights for her. The women of the town thought she was well rid of him. But after Vadinho's death, he remained the love of her life and she missed his seductiveness. He was irresistible, and his absence was, for Dona Flor, worse than the long nights when she waited for him to come home.

After a period of mourning, Dona Flor attracts another admirer, a local pharmacist, Teodoro. Unlike Vadinho he is a pillar of respectability, kind and considerate. Dona Flor accepts his proposal. While her new husband lacks the passionate sensuality of Vadinho, he compensates by providing a life free of worry. But, on the first anniversary of her marriage, Vadinho returns. He is now a ghost, but has lost none of his old ways. His activities create commotion everywhere, from Dona Flor's marriage bed to the local nightspots. She is torn between her attraction to the ghost and her desire to continue as the faithful wife of Teodoro, who has no idea what is going on.

== Style ==
Throughout the novel, Amado draws on Afro-Brazilian rituals and folklore. In the final section local deities, as well as most of the mystics of Bahia, get heavily involved. But Vadinho is the centerpiece of the novel, and the book captures the extravagance of his exploits, both during his life and after his death. According to a review by Ted Gioia, "few stories have done a better job of capturing this type of lovable villain".

== Adaptations ==
- Dona Flor and Her Two Husbands, a 1976 Brazilian film starring Sônia Braga as Flor
- Saravá, a 1979 Broadway musical starring Tovah Feldshuh as Flor
- Kiss Me Goodbye, a 1982 American film starring Sally Field as Kay
- Dona Flor e Seus 2 Maridos, a 1998 Brazilian TV series starring Giulia Gam as Flor
- Doña Flor y sus dos maridos, a 2006 Argentine play starring Mónica Ayos as Flor
- Dona Flor e Seus Dois Maridos, a 2008 Brazilian play starring Carol Castro as Flor
- Dona Flor e Seus Dois Maridos, a 2017 Brazilian film starring Juliana Paes as Flor
- Doña Flor y sus dos maridos, a 2019 Mexican telenovela starring Ana Serradilla as Flor
