= Jorge Amado =

Brazilian writer (1912–2001)

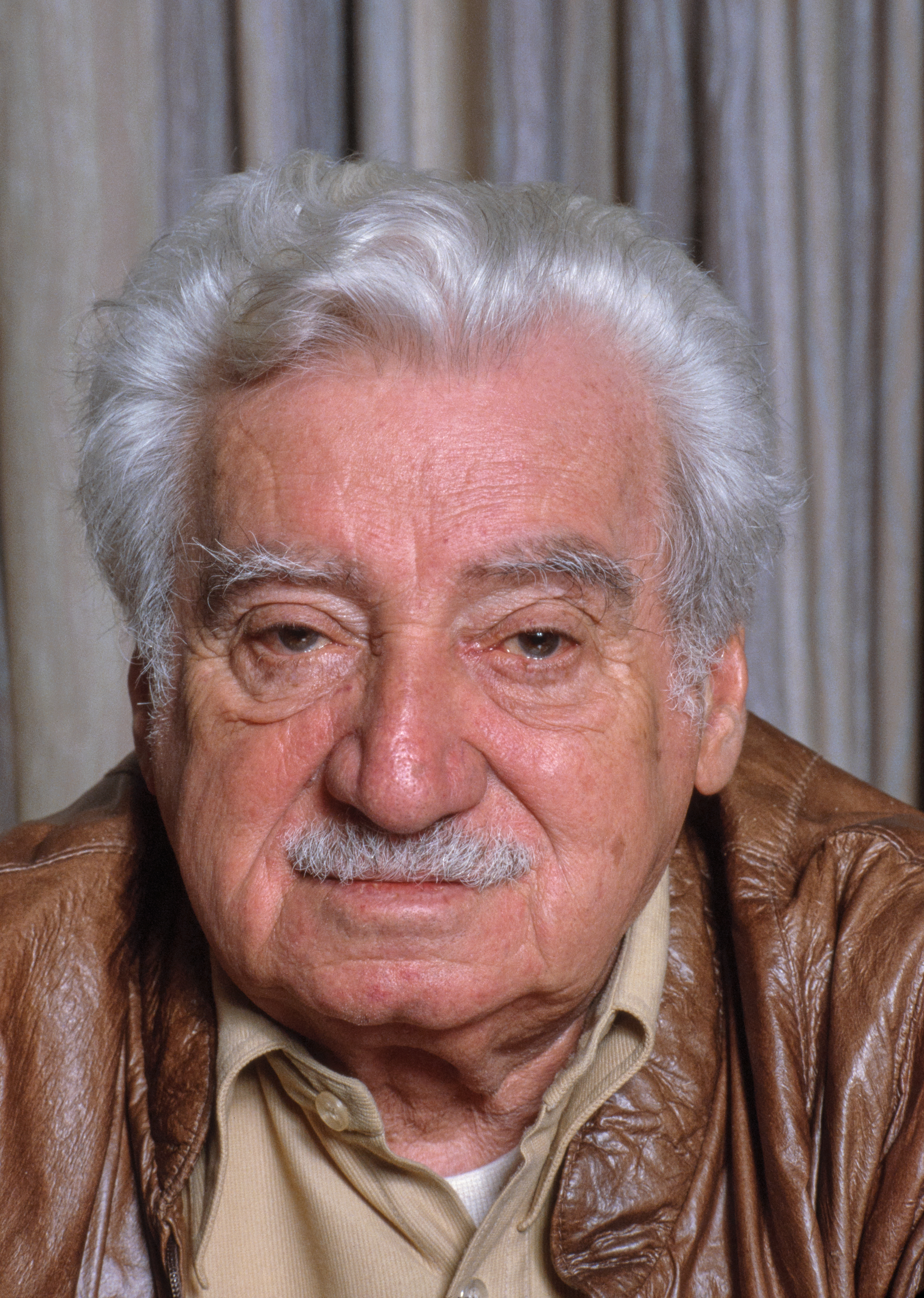
- Amado in 1988

Member of the Chamber of Deputies
- In office 5 February 1946 – 10 January 1948
- Constituency: São Paulo

Personal details
- Born: Jorge Amado; 10 August 1912 Itabuna, Bahia, Brazil
- Died: 6 August 2001 (aged 88) Salvador, Bahia, Brazil
- Party: PCB (1932–1956)
- Spouse: Zélia Gattai (m. 1945)
- Children: João Jorge Amado, Paloma Amado, Lila Amado
- Education: Federal University of Rio de Janeiro (LL.B.)
- Occupation: Writer, professor
- Writing career
- Relatives: Véra Clouzot (cousin)
- Genres: Novel, crônica, fable, short story
- Notable works: Gabriela, Clove and Cinnamon, Dona Flor and Her Two Husbands, Tieta, Captains of the Sands
- Literary movement: Modernism

Jorge Leal Amado de Faria (/ˈʒɔːrʒi/ ZHOR-zhee; Brazilian Portuguese: [ˈʒɔʁʒi aˈmadu]; 10 August 1912 – 6 August 2001), known as Jorge Amado, was a Brazilian writer of the modernist school. He remains the best-known of modern Brazilian writers, with his work having been translated into some 49 languages and popularized in film, including Dona Flor and Her Two Husbands in 1976, and having been nominated for the Nobel Prize in Literature at least seven times. His work reflects the image of a Mestiço Brazil and is marked by religious syncretism. He depicted a cheerful and optimistic country that was beset, at the same time, with deep social and economic differences.

He occupied the 23rd chair of the Brazilian Academy of Letters from 1961 until his death in 2001. He won the 1984 International Nonino Prize in Italy. He also was Federal Deputy for São Paulo as a member of the Brazilian Communist Party between 1947 and 1951.

== Biography ==
Amado was born on Saturday, 10 August 1912, on a farm near the inland city of Itabuna, in the south of the Brazilian state of Bahia. He was the eldest of four sons of João Amado de Faria and D. Eulália Leal. The farm was located in the village of Ferradas, which, though today is a district of Itabuna, was at the time administered by the coastal city of Ilhéus. For this reason, he considered himself a citizen of Ilhéus. From his exposure to the large cocoa plantations of the area, Amado knew the misery and the struggles of the people working the land and living in almost enslaved conditions. This was to be a theme present in several of his works, for example, The Violent Land of 1944.

As a result of a smallpox epidemic, his family moved to Ilhéus when he was one year old, and he spent his childhood there. He attended high school in Salvador, the capital of the state. By the age of 14 Amado had begun to collaborate with several magazines and took part in literary life, as one of the founders of the Modernist "Rebels' Academy".

He was the cousin of Brazilian lawyer, writer, journalist and politician Gilberto Amado, and of Brazilian actress and screenwriter Véra Clouzot.

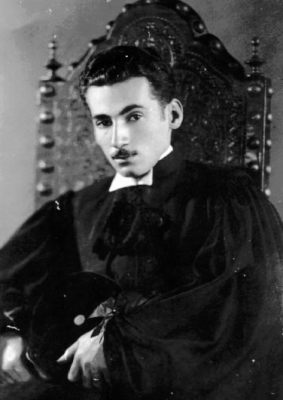
Amado in 1935

Amado published his first novel, The Country of Carnival, in 1931, aged 18. He married Matilde Garcia Rosa and had a daughter, Lila, in 1933. The same year he published his second novel, Cacau, which increased his popularity.

He studied law at the Federal University of Rio de Janeiro Faculty of Law but never became a practising lawyer. His leftist activities made his life difficult under the dictatorial regime of Getúlio Vargas. In 1935 he was arrested for the first time, and two years later his books were publicly burned. His works were banned from Portugal, but in the rest of Europe, he gained great popularity with the publication of Jubiabá in France. The book received enthusiastic reviews, including that of Nobel Prize winner French author Albert Camus.

In the early 1940s, Amado edited a literary supplement for the Nazi-funded political newspaper "Meio-Dia". Being a communist militant, from 1941 to 1942 Amado was compelled to go into exile to Argentina and Uruguay. When he returned to Brazil he separated from Matilde Garcia Rosa. In 1945 he was elected to the National Constituent Assembly, as a representative of the Brazilian Communist Party (PCB) (he received more votes than any other candidate in the state of São Paulo). He signed a law granting freedom of religious faith.

He remarried in 1945, to the writer Zélia Gattai. In 1947 they had a son, João Jorge. The same year his party was declared illegal, and its members arrested and persecuted. Amado chose exile once again, this time in France, where he remained until he was expelled in 1950.

His daughter from his first marriage, Lila, died in 1949. From 1950 to 1952 Amado and Gattai lived in Czechoslovakia, where another daughter, Paloma, was born. He also travelled to the Soviet Union, winning the Stalin Peace Prize in 1951. Documents released to the public in 2016 show that in this period he was investigated by the CIA.

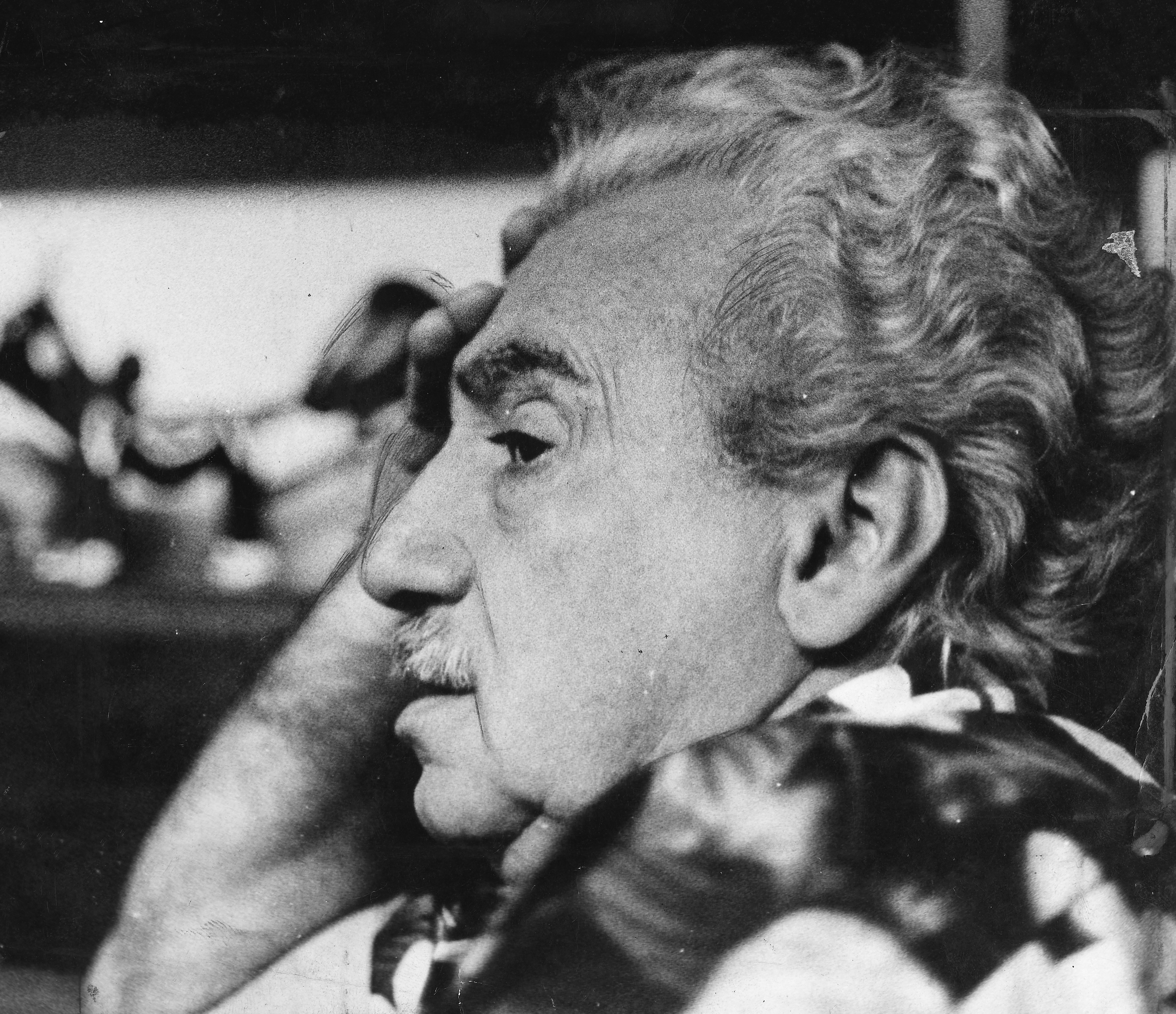
Jorge Amado, 1972. National Archives of Brazil.

On his return to Brazil in 1954, Amado abandoned active political life, leaving the Communist Party one year later. From that period on he dedicated himself solely to literature.

His second creative phase began in 1958 with Gabriela, Clove and Cinnamon, which was described by Jean-Paul Sartre as "the best example of a folk novel". Amado abandoned, in part, the realism and the social themes of his early works, producing a series of novels focusing mainly on feminine characters, devoted to a kind of smiling celebration of the traditions and the beauties of Bahia. In addition to Gabriela these novels included Tereza Batista: Home from the Wars and Dona Flor and Her Two Husbands.

His depiction of the sexual customs of his land was scandalous to much of 1950s Brazilian society and for several years Amado could not even enter Ilhéus, where Gabriela was set, due to threats received for the alleged offence to the morality of the city's women. The Soviet Union kept publishing Amado's works shortly after their release in Portuguese.

On 6 April 1961, he was elected to the Brazilian Academy of Letters. On his death, his wife was elected to replace him. Amado made the Academy the setting for one of his novels, Pen, Sword, Camisole. He received the title of Doctor honoris causa from several universities in Brazil, Portugal, Italy, Israel and France, as well as other honours in almost every South American country, including Obá de Xangô (santoon) of the Candomblé, the traditional Afro-Brazilian religion of Bahia.

He was finally removed from the French Government blacklist in 1965 following the intervention of the then Minister of Culture, André Malraux. In 1984 he was awarded the French Légion d’Honneur by President François Mitterrand.

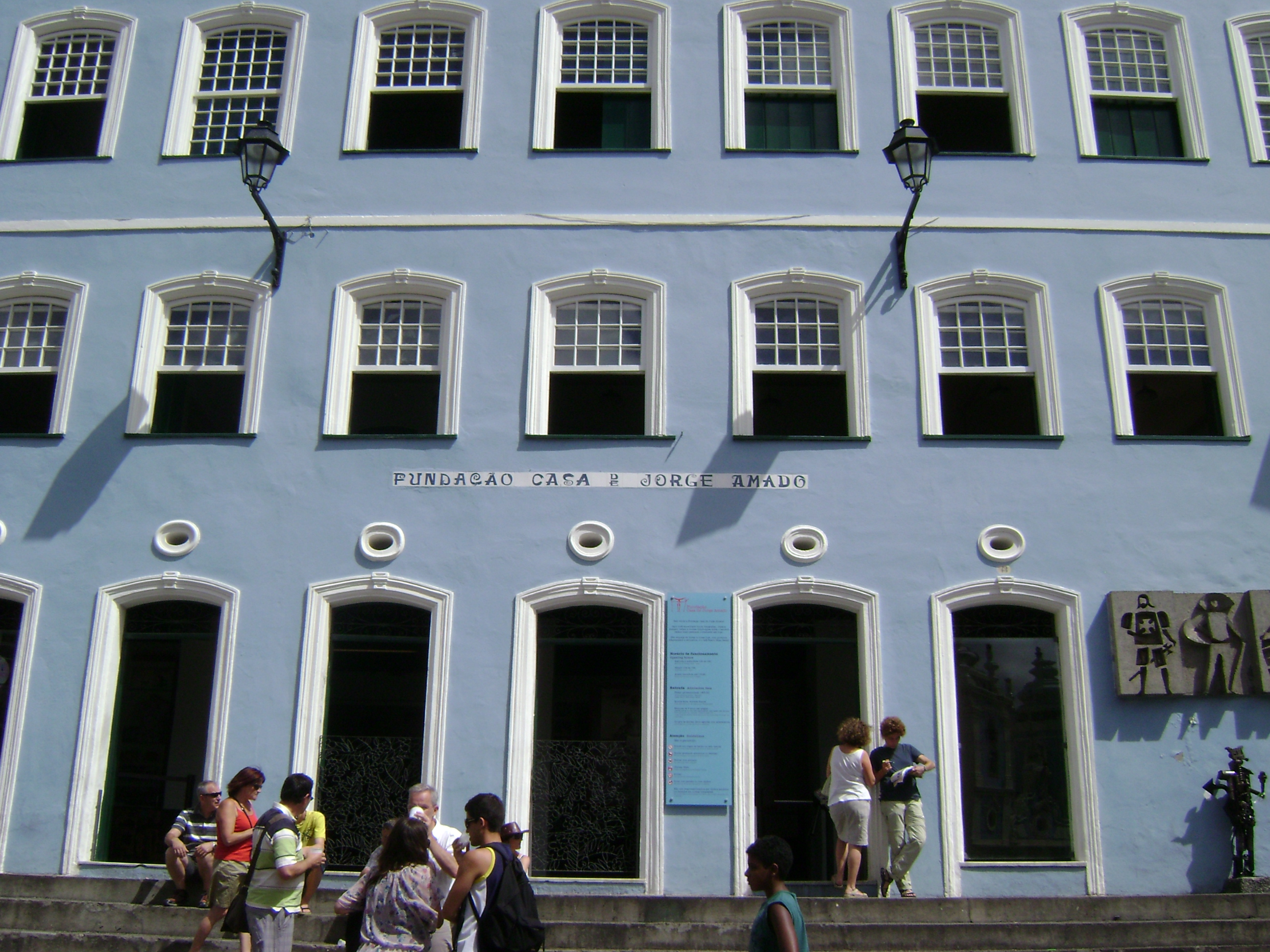
The Jorge Amado Foundation in Salvador da Bahia

His books have been translated into 49 languages in 55 countries, and adapted into films, theatrical works and TV programmes. They even inspired some samba schools of the Brazilian Carnival. He was nominated for the Nobel Prize for Literature at least seven times: in 1967, 1968, 1969, 1970, 1971, 1972, and 1973.

In 1987, the Fundação Casa de Jorge Amado was created in Salvador. It promotes the protection of Amado's estate and the development of culture in Bahia. The recently renovated building on the Pelourinho in Salvador contains a small museum and wall panels with the covers of international editions of Amado's books.

=== Final years and death ===
In his final years, Amado suffered from diabetes. On 5 August 2001, he was admitted to Hospital Aliança in Salvador (Bahia), where he died at the 19:30 BRT of the next day of heart and lung failure, four days before his 89th birthday. His ashes were spread in the garden of his house four days later.

=== Legacy ===
On 4 December 2014, he received (posthumously) from the Legislative Assembly of Bahia appointment as Commander of Meritorious Citizen of the Freedom and Social Justice João Mangabeira (CBJM), the State's highest honour, due to his work in defence of social rights.

On 20 October 2017, a newly-discovered species of frog from Bahia, Phyllodytes amadoi, was named in his honor. The discoverers of this species noted that in addition to living in the same area as the species' type locality, Amado was a lifelong frog enthusiast - over the course of his life, he had acquired a large collection of frog-themed souvenirs from around the world, some of which remain on display at his home in Salvador to this day.

==== Casa do Rio Vermelho memorial ====
The Casa do Rio Vermelho, located at 33 Rua Alagoinhas in Salvador's Rio Vermelho neighbourhood, was the residence of the writers Jorge Amado and Zélia Gattai. The couple acquired the house in 1960 with money from the sale of the film rights to Amado's novel Gabriela, Clove and Cinnamon to Metro-Goldwyn-Mayer. The residence became an important meeting place for artists, writers and intellectuals, receiving visitors such as Glauber Rocha, Pablo Neruda, Tom Jobim, Dorival Caymmi, Roman Polanski, Jack Nicholson, Jean-Paul Sartre and Simone de Beauvoir. After the residence ceased to be occupied, the property was transformed into a memorial dedicated to the life and work of Amado and Gattai, opening to the public in 2014. The memorial preserves the original characteristics of the residence and displays personal objects, photographs, documents and correspondence, as well as audiovisual installations; its garden contains the ashes of both writers.

== Selected works ==
- The Country of Carnival (O País do Carnaval, 1931)
- Cacau (1933)
- Sweat (Suor, 1934)
- Jubiabá (1935)
- Sea of Death (Mar Morto, 1936)
- Captains of the Sands (Capitães da Areia, 1937)
- The ABC of Castro Alves (ABC de Castro Alves, 1941)
- The Knight of Hope (Vida de Luis Carlos Prestes or O Cavaleiro da Esperança, 1942)
- The Violent Land (Terras do Sem Fim, 1943)
- The Golden Harvest (São Jorge dos Ilhéus, 1944)
- Bahia de Todos-os-santos (1945)
- Red Field (Seara Vermelha, 1946)
- The Bowels of Liberty trilogy (Os Subterrâneos da Liberdade, 1954)
- Gabriela, Clove and Cinnamon (Gabriela, Cravo e Canela, 1958)
- The Double Death of Quincas Water-Bray (A Morte e a Morte de Quincas Berro D'agua, 1959)
- Home Is the Sailor (Os Velhos Marinheiros ou o Capitão de Longo Curso, 1961)
- Ogum's Compadre (O compadre de Ogum, 1964)
- Shepherds of the Night (Os Pastores da Noite, 1964)
- Dona Flor and Her Two Husbands (Dona Flor e Seus Dois Maridos, 1966)
- Tent of Miracles (Tenda dos Milagres, 1969)
- Tereza Batista: Home from the Wars (Teresa Batista Cansada da Guerra, 1972)
- The Swallow and the Tomcat: A Love Story (O Gato Malhado e a Andorinha Sinhá: uma história de amor, 1976)
- Tieta (Tieta do Agreste, 1977)
- Pen, Sword, Camisole (Farda Fardão Camisola de Dormir, 1979)
- Showdown (Tocaia Grande, 1984)
- The War of the Saints (O Sumiço da Santa, 1988)
- Coasting (Navegação de Cabotagem, 1992)
- The Discovery of America by the Turks (A Descoberta da América pelos Turcos, 1994)

Academic offices
Preceded by Otávio Mangabeira	5th Academic of the 23rd chair of the Brazilian Academy of Letters; 1961–2001	Succeeded by Zélia Gattai
