= List of Brazilian Nobel laureates and nominees =

Since 1901, the Nobel Prize and the Sveriges Riksbank Prize in Economic Sciences in Memory of Alfred Nobel have been awarded to a total of 965 individuals and 27 organizations as of 2023.

While numerous notable Brazilians have been nominated for the prize, to date, no individual has received a Nobel Prize while concurrently being a Brazilian citizen. One Nobel Prize recipient, the biologist Peter Medawar (Note: Medawar acquired a Brazilian citizenship by birth as dictated by the Brazilian nationality law (jus soli). He left the country, together with his parents, at the age of 14 to finish high school in the United Kingdom. At age 18, he renounced his Brazilian citizenship when he refused to be drafted in the military and after his appeal for exemption was denied. When the Nobel Committee awarded him the Prize, he was acknowledged as a British citizen. It was only after his death when he was recognized also as being a Brazilian Nobel laureate.) (who won the 1960 Nobel Prize in Physiology or Medicine with Australian virologist Frank Macfarlane Burnet), was born a Brazilian citizen but renounced his Brazilian citizenship at the age of 18, long before receiving the prize.

Additionally, a number of Brazilians and Brazilian-based organizations were members of organizations at the time those organizations won a Nobel Prize, such as Sérgio Trindade and Carlos Nobre, members of the Intergovernmental Panel on Climate Change (IPCC) when it was awarded the prize in 2007.

== Laureates ==
A single individual has won the Nobel Prize who ever held Brazilian citizenship; however, he was not a Brazilian citizen at the time the award was granted:

Year	Image	Laureate	Born	Died	Field	Citation
Citizens
1960		Peter Medawar	28 February 1915; Petrópolis, Rio de Janeiro, Brazil	2 October 1987; London, United Kingdom	Physiology or Medicine	"for discovery of acquired immunological tolerance." (awarded together with Australian virologist Frank Macfarlane Burnet)

== Nominations ==
Since 1909, Brazilians have started to receive nominations for the prestigious Swedish prize in different categories. The following list are the nominees with verified nominations from the Nobel Committee and recognized international organizations. There are also other purported nominees whose nominations are yet to be verified since the archives are revealed 50 years after, among them:

- For Physics: Mário Schenberg (1914–1990), José Leite Lopes (1918–2006), Jayme Tiomno (1920–2011), Ennio Candotti (born 1942), Celso Grebogi (born 1947) and Carlos Bertulani (born 1955).
- For Chemistry: Otto Gottlieb, (1920–2011), Blanka Wladislaw (1917–2012), Ângelo da Cunha Pinto (1948–2015), and Elisa Orth (born 1984).
- For Physiology or Medicine: Maurício Rocha e Silva (1910–1983), Maria Carmela Lico (1927–1985), Aristides Leão (1914–1993), Euryclides de Jesus Zerbini (1912–1993), Nise da Silveira (1905–1999), Sérgio Henrique Ferreira (1934–2016), Ivo Pitanguy (1926–2016), Ruth Sonntag Nussenzweig (1928–2018), Ivan Izquierdo (1937–2021), José Eduardo Souza (1934–2022), Eduardo Krieger (born 1928), Miguel Nicolelis (born 1961), Celina Turchi (born 1952), Cesar Victora (born 1952)
- For Literature: Carolina Maria de Jesus (1914–1977), Clarice Lispector (1920–1977), Vinicius de Moraes (1913–1980), Cora Coralina (1889–1985), João Cabral de Melo Neto (1920–1999), Haroldo de Campos (1929–2003), Rachel de Queiroz (1910–2003), Hilda Hilst (1930–2004), Josué Montello (1917–2006), Moacyr Scliar (1937–2011), Rubem Fonseca (1925–2020), Nélida Piñon (1937–2022), Adélia Prado (born 1935), Ignacio de Loyola Brandão (born 1936), Marina Colasanti (born 1937), Marcia Theophilo (born 1941), Chico Buarque (born 1944), Paulo Coelho (born 1947), Milton Hatoum (born 1952), Bernardo Carvalho (born 1960), Daniel Munduruku (born 1964), Paulo Scott (born 1966), Adriana Lisboa (born 1970), and Jeferson Tenório (born 1977).
- For Peace: Marcolino Gomes Candau (1911–1983), Chico Mendes (1944–1988), José "Gentileza" Datrino (1917–1996), José Lutzenberger (1926–2002), Sérgio Vieira de Mello (1948–2003), Fernando Henrique Cardoso (born 1931), Chico Whitaker (born 1931), Erwin Kräutler, CPpS (born 1939), Frei Betto (born 1944), José Bustani (born 1945), Júlio Lancellotti (born 1948), Davi Kopenawa Yanomami (born 1956), Izabella Teixeira (born 1961), Sônia Guajajara (born 1974), and Claudelice Silva dos Santos (born 1982).
- For Economic Sciences: André Lara Resende (born 1951), Pérsio Arida (born 1952), Gustavo Franco (born 1956) and Ricardo Amorim (born 1971).

Image	Nominee	Born	Died	Years Nominated	Citation	Nominator(s)
Physics
	César Lattes	11 July 1924; Curitiba, Paraná, Brazil	8 March 2005; Campinas, São Paulo, Brazil	1949	"for his pioneering discovery and researches of the pion, a composite subatmic particle made of a quark and an antiquark."	Walter Scott Hill Rodríguez (1903–1987); Uruguay
	César Lattes	11 July 1924; Curitiba, Paraná, Brazil	8 March 2005; Campinas, São Paulo, Brazil	1949	"for his pioneering discovery and researches of the pion, a composite subatmic particle made of a quark and an antiquark."	James Holley Bartlett (1904–2000); United States
	César Lattes	11 July 1924; Curitiba, Paraná, Brazil	8 March 2005; Campinas, São Paulo, Brazil	1951	"for his pioneering discovery and researches of the pion, a composite subatmic particle made of a quark and an antiquark."	Gleb Wataghin (1899–1986); Italy
	César Lattes	11 July 1924; Curitiba, Paraná, Brazil	8 March 2005; Campinas, São Paulo, Brazil	1952	"for his pioneering discovery and researches of the pion, a composite subatmic particle made of a quark and an antiquark."	Marcel Schein (1902–1960); United States
	César Lattes	11 July 1924; Curitiba, Paraná, Brazil	8 March 2005; Campinas, São Paulo, Brazil	1952, 1953, 1954	"for his pioneering discovery and researches of the pion, a composite subatmic particle made of a quark and an antiquark."	Leopold Ružička (1887–1976); Switzerland
	David Bohm (Note: David Bohm applied for and received Brazilian citizenship, but by law, had to give up his US citizenship; he was able to reclaim it only decades later, in 1986, after pursuing a lawsuit.)	20 December 1917; Wilkes-Barre, Pennsylvania, United States	27 October 1992; London, United Kingdom	1958	"for his causal and deterministic interpretation of quantum theory (now known as De Broglie–Bohm theory)."	H. Nakano (?); Japan
Chemistry
	René Wurmser (Note: The French biophysicist R. Wurmser was nominated while working temporarily as professor at Rio de Janeiro, Brazil.)	4 September 1890; Paris, France	9 November 1993; Boulogne-Billancourt, Paris, France	1942	"for his research on blood preservation and transfusion."	Jean Baptiste Perrin (Note: J. B. Perrin nominated R. Wurmser as his first choice and G. Bertrand as his second choice.) (1870–1942); France
	Fritz Feigl (Note: F. Fiegl immigrated to Brazil in 1940 and obtained a citizenship in 1944.)	15 May 1891; Vienna, Austria	23 January 1971; Rio de Janeiro, Brazil	1955	"for his development of spot analysis (spot test) and luminol."	R. Strebinger (?); Austria
	Fritz Feigl	15 May 1891; Vienna, Austria	23 January 1971; Rio de Janeiro, Brazil	1957	"for his development of spot analysis (spot test) and luminol."	Felix Machatschki (1895–1970); Austria
	Fritz Feigl	15 May 1891; Vienna, Austria	23 January 1971; Rio de Janeiro, Brazil	1962	"for his development of spot analysis (spot test) and luminol."	R. Belcher (?); United Kingdom
	Fritz Feigl	15 May 1891; Vienna, Austria	23 January 1971; Rio de Janeiro, Brazil	1963, 1966	"for his development of spot analysis (spot test) and luminol."	Hanns Malissa (1920–2010); Austria
	Fritz Feigl	15 May 1891; Vienna, Austria	23 January 1971; Rio de Janeiro, Brazil	1963, 1969	"for his development of spot analysis (spot test) and luminol."	Friedrich Hecht (1903–1980); Austria
	Fritz Feigl	15 May 1891; Vienna, Austria	23 January 1971; Rio de Janeiro, Brazil	1966, 1967, 1969	"for his development of spot analysis (spot test) and luminol."	P. W. West (?); United States
	Fritz Feigl	15 May 1891; Vienna, Austria	23 January 1971; Rio de Janeiro, Brazil	1967	"for his development of spot analysis (spot test) and luminol."	Ami Glasner (?); Israel
	Johanna Döbereiner	28 November 1924; Ústí nad Labem, Czech Republic	5 October 2000; Seropédica, Rio de Janeiro, Brazil	1995, 1997	"for her research on the effectivity of using nitrogen-fixing bacteria in soybean farming."	
Physiology or Medicine
	Carlos Chagas	9 July 1879; Oliveira, Minas Gerais, Brazil	8 November 1934; Rio de Janeiro, Brazil	1913	"for his discovery of a new trypanosome disease (thyroidite parasitaire)."	Pirajá da Silva (1873–1961); Brazil
	Carlos Chagas	9 July 1879; Oliveira, Minas Gerais, Brazil	8 November 1934; Rio de Janeiro, Brazil	1921	"for his research on malaria and paludism, and the discovery of Trypanozoma cruzi.	Hilário de Gouvêa (1843–1929); Brazil
	Antônio Cardoso Fontes	6 October 1879; Petrópolis, Rio de Janeiro, Brazil	27 March 1943; Rio de Janeiro, Brazil	1934 (Note: A. C. Fontes was nominated together with the French biologist Gaston Ramon (1886–1963).)	"for his work on the ultravirus of the tubercle bacillus."	Michel Weinberg (1868–1940); France
	Adolfo Lutz	18 December 1855; Rio de Janeiro, Brazil	6 October 1940; Rio de Janeiro, Brazil	1938	"for his work on tropical diseases (lepra, sporotrichosis, yellow fever, malaria) and their transmission."	Octávio Coelho de Magalhães (1880–1972); Brazil
	Manuel de Abreu	4 January 1894; São Paulo, Brazil	30 January 1962; Rio de Janeiro, Brazil	1946	"for his introduction of collective radiology photography: abreugraphy."	Ugo Pinheiro Guimarães (1901–1992); Brazil
	Manuel de Abreu	4 January 1894; São Paulo, Brazil	30 January 1962; Rio de Janeiro, Brazil	1946	"for his introduction of collective radiology photography: abreugraphy."	Arnaldo de Moraes (1893–1961); Brazil
	Manuel de Abreu	4 January 1894; São Paulo, Brazil	30 January 1962; Rio de Janeiro, Brazil	1946	"for his introduction of collective radiology photography: abreugraphy."	Alfredo Monteiro (1893–1961); Brazil
	Manuel de Abreu	4 January 1894; São Paulo, Brazil	30 January 1962; Rio de Janeiro, Brazil	1946	"for his introduction of collective radiology photography: abreugraphy."	Henrique Roxo (1877–1969); Brazil
	Manuel de Abreu	4 January 1894; São Paulo, Brazil	30 January 1962; Rio de Janeiro, Brazil	1951	"for his development of a collective systematic X-ray photography."	António Egas Moniz (1874–1955); Portugal
	Manuel de Abreu	4 January 1894; São Paulo, Brazil	30 January 1962; Rio de Janeiro, Brazil	1953	No motivation given.	Francisco R. d'Ovidio (?); Brazil
Literature
	Henrique Coelho Neto	21 February 1864; Caxias, Maranhão, Brazil	28 November 1934; Rio de Janeiro, Brazil	1933	O Rajá de Pendjab (1898); O Morto, Memórias de um Fuzilado (1898); Theatro, vol. I–V (1897–1909); Mano, Livro da Saudade (1924)	Hjalmar Hammarskjöld (1862–1953); Sweden
	Henrique Coelho Neto	21 February 1864; Caxias, Maranhão, Brazil	28 November 1934; Rio de Janeiro, Brazil	1933	O Rajá de Pendjab (1898); O Morto, Memórias de um Fuzilado (1898); Theatro, vol. I–V (1897–1909); Mano, Livro da Saudade (1924)	20 members of the Brazilian Academy of Letters
	Flávio de Carvalho	10 August 1899; Barra Mansa, Rio de Janeiro, Brazil	4 June 1973; Valinhos, São Paulo, Brazil	1939	A Cidade do Homem Nu (1930); Dança do Deus Morto (1933)	Paul V. Shaw (?); Brazil
	Manoel Wanderley (prob. Manuel Bandeira (1886–1968))	Brazil	Brazil	1941		Francisco de Aquino Correia (1885–1956); Brazil
	Pietro Ubaldi*	18 August 1886; Foligno, Perugia, Italy	29 February 1972; São Vicente, São Paulo, Brazil	1962, 1963, 1965, 1966, 1967, 1969	A Grande Síntese (1932–35); Ascensio Uma (1951); Ascese Mística (1983)	Academia Santista de Letras
	Pietro Ubaldi*	18 August 1886; Foligno, Perugia, Italy	29 February 1972; São Vicente, São Paulo, Brazil	1964	A Grande Síntese (1932–35); Ascensio Uma (1951); Ascese Mística (1983)	João de Freitas Guimarães (?); Brazil
	Pietro Ubaldi*	18 August 1886; Foligno, Perugia, Italy	29 February 1972; São Vicente, São Paulo, Brazil	1968	A Grande Síntese (1932–35); Ascensio Uma (1951); Ascese Mística (1983)	(Note: The name of the nominator(s) of this nomination was not present in the list of nominations for 1968.)
	Erico Verissimo	17 December 1905; Cruz Alta, Rio Grande do Sul, Brazil	28 November 1975; Porto Alegre, Rio Grande do Sul, Brazil	1963	As Aventuras do Avião Vermelho (1936); O Tempo e o Vento (1949–1961); Noite (1954); O Senhor Embaixador (1965)	Jean Roche (1901–1992); France
	Erico Verissimo	17 December 1905; Cruz Alta, Rio Grande do Sul, Brazil	28 November 1975; Porto Alegre, Rio Grande do Sul, Brazil	1968	As Aventuras do Avião Vermelho (1936); O Tempo e o Vento (1949–1961); Noite (1954); O Senhor Embaixador (1965)	
	Alceu Amoroso Lima	11 December 1893; Petrópolis, Rio de Janeiro, Brazil	14 August 1983; Petrópolis, Rio de Janeiro, Brazil	1965	Mitos de Nosso Tempo (1943); O Existencialismo e Outros Mitos de Nosso Tempo (1951); Meditações Sobre o Mundo Interior (1953); O Humanismo Ameaçado (1965)	Academia Mineira de Letras
	Carlos Drummond de Andrade	31 October 1902; Itabira, Minas Gerais, Brazil	17 August 1987; Rio de Janeiro, Brazil	1967	Sentimento do Mundo (1940); A Rosa do Povo (1945); As Impurezas do Branco (1973); O Amor Natural (1992)	Gunnar Ekelöf (1907–1968); Sweden
	Carlos Drummond de Andrade	31 October 1902; Itabira, Minas Gerais, Brazil	17 August 1987; Rio de Janeiro, Brazil	1969	Sentimento do Mundo (1940); A Rosa do Povo (1945); As Impurezas do Branco (1973); O Amor Natural (1992)	Artur Lundkvist (1906–1991); Sweden
	Jorge Amado	10 August 1912; Itabuna, Bahia, Brazil	6 August 2001; Salvador, Bahia, Brazil	1967	O País do Carnaval (1931); Jubiabá (1935); Capitães da Areia (1937); Terras do Sem Fim (1945); Gabriela, Cravo e Canela (1958); Tieta do Agreste (1977); Farda Fardão Camisola de Dormir (1978)	Sociedade Brasileira de Autores Teatrais
	Jorge Amado	10 August 1912; Itabuna, Bahia, Brazil	6 August 2001; Salvador, Bahia, Brazil	1967	O País do Carnaval (1931); Jubiabá (1935); Capitães da Areia (1937); Terras do Sem Fim (1945); Gabriela, Cravo e Canela (1958); Tieta do Agreste (1977); Farda Fardão Camisola de Dormir (1978)	Fred P. Ellison (1922–2004); United States
	Jorge Amado	10 August 1912; Itabuna, Bahia, Brazil	6 August 2001; Salvador, Bahia, Brazil	1967	O País do Carnaval (1931); Jubiabá (1935); Capitães da Areia (1937); Terras do Sem Fim (1945); Gabriela, Cravo e Canela (1958); Tieta do Agreste (1977); Farda Fardão Camisola de Dormir (1978)	Earl William Thomas (1915–1981); United States
	Jorge Amado	10 August 1912; Itabuna, Bahia, Brazil	6 August 2001; Salvador, Bahia, Brazil	1967, 1968	O País do Carnaval (1931); Jubiabá (1935); Capitães da Areia (1937); Terras do Sem Fim (1945); Gabriela, Cravo e Canela (1958); Tieta do Agreste (1977); Farda Fardão Camisola de Dormir (1978)	Brazilian Writers Association
	Jorge Amado	10 August 1912; Itabuna, Bahia, Brazil	6 August 2001; Salvador, Bahia, Brazil	1967, 1968, 1969, 1970	O País do Carnaval (1931); Jubiabá (1935); Capitães da Areia (1937); Terras do Sem Fim (1945); Gabriela, Cravo e Canela (1958); Tieta do Agreste (1977); Farda Fardão Camisola de Dormir (1978)	Antônio Olinto (1919–2009); Brazil
	Jorge Amado	10 August 1912; Itabuna, Bahia, Brazil	6 August 2001; Salvador, Bahia, Brazil	1968, 1969	O País do Carnaval (1931); Jubiabá (1935); Capitães da Areia (1937); Terras do Sem Fim (1945); Gabriela, Cravo e Canela (1958); Tieta do Agreste (1977); Farda Fardão Camisola de Dormir (1978)	Jean Subirats (?); France
	Jorge Amado	10 August 1912; Itabuna, Bahia, Brazil	6 August 2001; Salvador, Bahia, Brazil	1969	O País do Carnaval (1931); Jubiabá (1935); Capitães da Areia (1937); Terras do Sem Fim (1945); Gabriela, Cravo e Canela (1958); Tieta do Agreste (1977); Farda Fardão Camisola de Dormir (1978)	Joracy Camargo (1898–1973); Brazil
	Jorge Amado	10 August 1912; Itabuna, Bahia, Brazil	6 August 2001; Salvador, Bahia, Brazil	1969	O País do Carnaval (1931); Jubiabá (1935); Capitães da Areia (1937); Terras do Sem Fim (1945); Gabriela, Cravo e Canela (1958); Tieta do Agreste (1977); Farda Fardão Camisola de Dormir (1978)	Vitorino Nemésio (1901–1978); Portugal
	Jorge Amado	10 August 1912; Itabuna, Bahia, Brazil	6 August 2001; Salvador, Bahia, Brazil	1969, 1971	O País do Carnaval (1931); Jubiabá (1935); Capitães da Areia (1937); Terras do Sem Fim (1945); Gabriela, Cravo e Canela (1958); Tieta do Agreste (1977); Farda Fardão Camisola de Dormir (1978)	Laurent Versini (1932–2021); France
	Jorge Amado	10 August 1912; Itabuna, Bahia, Brazil	6 August 2001; Salvador, Bahia, Brazil	1970	O País do Carnaval (1931); Jubiabá (1935); Capitães da Areia (1937); Terras do Sem Fim (1945); Gabriela, Cravo e Canela (1958); Tieta do Agreste (1977); Farda Fardão Camisola de Dormir (1978)	Marcos Almir Madeira (1916–2003); Brazil
	Gerardo Melo Mourão	8 January 1917; Ipueiras, Ceará, Brazil	9 March 2007; Humaitá, Rio de Janeiro, Brazil	1979	O País dos Mourões (1963); Peripécia de Gerardo (1972); Valete de Espadas (1986); O Bêbado de Deus (2000)	
	Ferreira Gullar	10 September 1930; São Luís, Maranhão, Brazil	4 December 2016; Rio de Janeiro, Brazil	2002	A Luta Corporal (1954); Poema Sujo (1976); Barulhos (1987); Indagações de Hoje (1989)	Brazilian Academy of Letters
	Ariano Suassuna	16 June 1927; João Pessoa, Paraíba, Brazil	23 July 2014; Recife, Pernambuco, Brazil	2012	O Auto da Compadecida (1955); A Caseira e a Catarina (1962); O Santo e a Porca (1964); A Pedra do Reino (1971)	Cássio Cunha Lima (b. 1963); Brazil
	Moniz Bandeira	30 December 1935; Salvador, Bahia, Brazil	10 November 2017; Heidelberg, Baden-Württemberg, Brazil	2015	Retrato e Tempo (1960); O Feudo – A Casa da Torre de Garcia d'Ávila (2001); Formação do Império Americano (2005)	Brazilian Writers Union
	Lygia Fagundes Telles	19 April 1918; São Paulo, Brazil	3 April 2022; São Paulo, Brazil	2016	Ciranda de Pedra (1955); Antes do Baile Verde (1970); As Meninas (1973); Seminário dos Ratos (1998)	Brazilian Writers Union
	Carlos Nejar	11 January 1939; Porto Alegre, Rio Grande do Sul, Brazil	—N/a	2017	Livro de Silbion (1963); Ordenações (1971); Árvore do Mundo (1977); A Idade da Eternidade (2001)	Brazilian Academy of Letters
	Emanuel Medeiros Vieira	31 March 1945; Florianópolis, Santa Catarina, Brazil	29 July 2019; Brasília, Brazil	2018	Sexo, Tristeza e Flores (1976); Um Dia Estarás Comigo no Paraíso (1985); No Altiplano: Contemplando o Comandante Ernesto (2000); Olhos Azuis – Ao Sul do Efêmero (2009)	International Writers Association
	Deonísio da Silva	1948; Siderópolis, Santa Catarina, Brazil	—N/a	2022	Avante, Soldados: Para Trás (1992); Teresa D'Ávila (1997); Goethe e Barrabás (2008); Stefan Zweig Deve Morrer (2012)	Academia Internacional de Escritores Basileiros
Peace
	Sebastião de Magalhães Lima	30 May 1850; Rio de Janeiro, Brazil	7 December 1928; Lisbon, Portugal	1909	No motivation given.	Feio Terenas (1850–1920); Portugal
	José Paranhos, Baron of Rio Branco	20 April 1845; Rio de Janeiro, Brazil	10 February 1912; Rio de Janeiro, Brazil	1911	"for his efforts to secure Brazil's borders through several boundary settlements and to solve the conflicts between Brazil and its neighboring countries, and also for participating in the Brazilian abolitionist movement and directly engaging in 27 arbitration treaties."	Gonzalo de Quesada y Aróstegui (1868–1915); Cuba
	José Paranhos, Baron of Rio Branco	20 April 1845; Rio de Janeiro, Brazil	10 February 1912; Rio de Janeiro, Brazil	1911	"for his efforts to secure Brazil's borders through several boundary settlements and to solve the conflicts between Brazil and its neighboring countries, and also for participating in the Brazilian abolitionist movement and directly engaging in 27 arbitration treaties."	Carlos Peixoto (1845–1928) Brazil; J. de Medeinos (?) Brazil
	Érico da Gama Coelho	7 March 1849; Cabo Frio, Rio de Janeiro, Brazil	26 November 1922; Rio de Janeiro, Brazil	1916	No motivation given.	Alcindo Guanabara (1865–1918); Brazil
	Raimundo Teixeira Mendes	5 January 1855; Caxias, Maranhão, Brazil	28 June 1927; Rio de Janeiro, Brazil	1924	"for his role as the leader of 'Eglis positiviste' in Brazil."	Joaquim Luís Osório (?); Brazil
	Brazilian Historic and Geographic Institute	founded on 21 October 1838 in Rio de Janeiro, Brazil		1924	No motivation given.	Clóvis Beviláqua (1859–1944); Brazil
	Afrânio de Melo Franco	25 February 1870; Paracatu, Minas Gerais, Brazil	1 January 1943; Rio de Janeiro, Brazil	1935	"for his role as mediator in the conflict between Colombia and Peru." (Note: The conflict between Colombia and Peru erupted in 1932 when 300 Peruvians occupied the Leticia harbour. The jurisdiction over Leticia had been handed over from Peru to Colombia in 1922.)	Elihu Root (1845–1937) et al. (Note: A. de Melo Franco alone received 43 nominations in 1935. His nomination was endorsed by Charles Hardinge (1858–1944), Hugh Lowther (1857–1944), Jan Kosters (1874–1951), George Sutherland-Leveson-Gower (1888–1963), members of the Chilean Parliament, members of the Peruvian Congress, Bernard Loder (1849–1935), members of the Peruvian Congress, 3 Venezuelan members of the Permanent Court of Arbitration, members of the Portuguese Government, members of the Brazilian Parliament, members of the Mexican Parliament, members of the Uruguayan Senate, members of the Ecuadorian Senate and Government, Roberto Urdaneta Arbeláez (1890–1972), members of the Cuban Government, Rufus Isaacs (1860–1935), Thomas Coats (1894–1974), Charles de Visscher (1884–1973), Cecil Hurst (1870–1963), Georges Dumas (1866–1946), Cosme de la Torriente y Peraza (1872–1956), Miguel Cruchaga Tocornal (1869–1949), Juan José de Arteaga (?), Carel Daniël Asser (1866–1939), Thomas Barclay (1853–1941), Carlos Manuel de Céspedes y Quesada (1871–1939), Robert Horne (1871–1940), Bufete Dolz (?), Paul Latham (1905–1955), Pablo Desvernine (?), Antonio Sánchez de Bustamante y Sirven (1865–1951), Giuseppe Motta (1871–1940), A. Anema (?), Sun Fo (1891–1973), Nicolae Titulescu (1882–1941), José Caeiro da Mata (1883–1963) and Damião Peres (1889–1976).); United States
	Afrânio de Melo Franco	25 February 1870; Paracatu, Minas Gerais, Brazil	1 January 1943; Rio de Janeiro, Brazil	1935, 1937	"for his role as mediator in the conflict between Colombia and Peru."	Carlos Concha Cárdenas (1888–1944); Peru
	Afrânio de Melo Franco	25 February 1870; Paracatu, Minas Gerais, Brazil	1 January 1943; Rio de Janeiro, Brazil	1937	"for his role as mediator in the conflict between Colombia and Peru."	Léon Brunschvicg (1869–1944) France; Lucien Lévy-Bruhl (1857–1939) France
	Afrânio de Melo Franco	25 February 1870; Paracatu, Minas Gerais, Brazil	1 January 1943; Rio de Janeiro, Brazil	1938 (Note: The nomination was also signed by two persons whose right to nominate was uncertain. The Brazilian ambassador to Oslo submitted the nomination.)	"for his role as mediator in the conflict between Colombia and Peru."	Philadelpho Azevedo (1894–1951) Brazil; Edmundo da Luz Pinto (1898–1963) Brazil
	Oswaldo Aranha	15 February 1894; Alegrete, Rio Grande do Sul, Brazil	27 January 1960; Rio de Janeiro, Brazil	1948	"for his peace efforts when he was serving as Brazilian ambassador to the United States, and for his work while serving as president of the United Nations General Assembly."	members of the Costa Rican Government
	Oswaldo Aranha	15 February 1894; Alegrete, Rio Grande do Sul, Brazil	27 January 1960; Rio de Janeiro, Brazil	1948	"for his peace efforts when he was serving as Brazilian ambassador to the United States, and for his work while serving as president of the United Nations General Assembly."	Americano Jorge (?); Brazil
	Oswaldo Aranha	15 February 1894; Alegrete, Rio Grande do Sul, Brazil	27 January 1960; Rio de Janeiro, Brazil	1948	"for his peace efforts when he was serving as Brazilian ambassador to the United States, and for his work while serving as president of the United Nations General Assembly."	Enrique García Sayán (1905–1978); Peru
	Oswaldo Aranha	15 February 1894; Alegrete, Rio Grande do Sul, Brazil	27 January 1960; Rio de Janeiro, Brazil	1948	"for his peace efforts when he was serving as Brazilian ambassador to the United States, and for his work while serving as president of the United Nations General Assembly."	Edwin Borchard (1884–1951); United States
	Oswaldo Aranha	15 February 1894; Alegrete, Rio Grande do Sul, Brazil	27 January 1960; Rio de Janeiro, Brazil	1948	"for his peace efforts when he was serving as Brazilian ambassador to the United States, and for his work while serving as president of the United Nations General Assembly."	Philadelpho Azevedo (1894–1951); Brazil
	Oswaldo Aranha	15 February 1894; Alegrete, Rio Grande do Sul, Brazil	27 January 1960; Rio de Janeiro, Brazil	1948	"for his peace efforts when he was serving as Brazilian ambassador to the United States, and for his work while serving as president of the United Nations General Assembly."	83 members of the Brazilian Chamber of Deputies
	Oswaldo Aranha	15 February 1894; Alegrete, Rio Grande do Sul, Brazil	27 January 1960; Rio de Janeiro, Brazil	1948	"for his peace efforts when he was serving as Brazilian ambassador to the United States, and for his work while serving as president of the United Nations General Assembly."	40 members of the Brazilian Senate
	Oswaldo Aranha	15 February 1894; Alegrete, Rio Grande do Sul, Brazil	27 January 1960; Rio de Janeiro, Brazil	1948	"for his peace efforts when he was serving as Brazilian ambassador to the United States, and for his work while serving as president of the United Nations General Assembly."	Carlos Saavedra Lamas (1878–1959); Argentina
	Oswaldo Aranha	15 February 1894; Alegrete, Rio Grande do Sul, Brazil	27 January 1960; Rio de Janeiro, Brazil	1948	"for his peace efforts when he was serving as Brazilian ambassador to the United States, and for his work while serving as president of the United Nations General Assembly."	Cordell Hull (1871–1955); United States
	Henrique Vasconcellos	Brazil	Brazil	1952	"for his books on World Government."	Saulo Ramos (1929–2013); Brazil
	Josué de Castro	5 September 1908; Recife, Pernambuco, Brazil	24 September 1973; Paris, France	1953	"for his work on increase in population and access to food through his book Geography of Hunger (1952)."	E. L. Viana (?) Brazil; Victor Nunes Leal (1914–1985) Brazil
	Josué de Castro	5 September 1908; Recife, Pernambuco, Brazil	24 September 1973; Paris, France	1953	"for his work on increase in population and access to food through his book Geography of Hunger (1952)."	Richard Acland (1906–1990); United Kingdom
	Josué de Castro	5 September 1908; Recife, Pernambuco, Brazil	24 September 1973; Paris, France	1953	"for his work on increase in population and access to food through his book Geography of Hunger (1952)."	Aneurin Bevan (1897–1960); United Kingdom
	Josué de Castro	5 September 1908; Recife, Pernambuco, Brazil	24 September 1973; Paris, France	1963	"for his book The Geography of Hunger (1952)."	Lewis Silkin (1889–1972); United Kingdom
	Josué de Castro	5 September 1908; Recife, Pernambuco, Brazil	24 September 1973; Paris, France	1965	"for his efforts in the pursuit of a world at peace, a world freed from war, and a world freed from hunger."	Lewis Silkin (1889–1972); United Kingdom
	Josué de Castro	5 September 1908; Recife, Pernambuco, Brazil	24 September 1973; Paris, France	1964	"for his outstanding service to the establishment of permanent peace and towards the abolishment of hunger."	Gilbert McAllister (1906–1964); United Kingdom
	Josué de Castro	5 September 1908; Recife, Pernambuco, Brazil	24 September 1973; Paris, France	1965	"for his relentless work to eradicate hunger."	R. B. Vieilleville (?); France
	Josué de Castro	5 September 1908; Recife, Pernambuco, Brazil	24 September 1973; Paris, France	1970	"for his active part in all organizations working for world peace."	John Boyd Orr (1880–1971); United Kingdom
	Josué de Castro	5 September 1908; Recife, Pernambuco, Brazil	24 September 1973; Paris, France	1973		David Wismark (?); Sweden
	Raul Fernandes	24 October 1877; Valença, Rio de Janeiro, Brazil	6 January 1968; Rio de Janeiro, Brazil	1953, 1954	"for his contribution in establishing The International Court of Justice."	Haroldo Valladão (1901–1987); Brazil
	Raul Fernandes	24 October 1877; Valença, Rio de Janeiro, Brazil	6 January 1968; Rio de Janeiro, Brazil	1953	"for his contribution in establishing The International Court of Justice."	Sousa Arruda (?); Brazil
	Cândido Rondon	5 May 1865; Santo Antônio do Leverger, Mato Grosso, Brazil	19 April 1958; Rio de Janeiro, Brazil	1953	"for promoting peace in the territorial dispute between Colombia and Peru and working with the Indian Protection Service."	Emily Greene Balch (1867–1961); United States
	Cândido Rondon	5 May 1865; Santo Antônio do Leverger, Mato Grosso, Brazil	19 April 1958; Rio de Janeiro, Brazil	1953	"for promoting peace in the territorial dispute between Colombia and Peru and working with the Indian Protection Service."	Álvaro Pereira de Sousa Lima (1890–1968); Brazil
	Cândido Rondon	5 May 1865; Santo Antônio do Leverger, Mato Grosso, Brazil	19 April 1958; Rio de Janeiro, Brazil	1953	"for promoting peace in the territorial dispute between Colombia and Peru and working with the Indian Protection Service."	Damião Peres (1889–1976); Portugal
	Cândido Rondon	5 May 1865; Santo Antônio do Leverger, Mato Grosso, Brazil	19 April 1958; Rio de Janeiro, Brazil	1953	"for promoting peace in the territorial dispute between Colombia and Peru and working with the Indian Protection Service."	Jean Silvandre (1896–1960); France
	Cândido Rondon	5 May 1865; Santo Antônio do Leverger, Mato Grosso, Brazil	19 April 1958; Rio de Janeiro, Brazil	1957	"for his outstanding devotion to protect the Indians of Brazil, and his contribution to creating peace in the conflict between Peru and Columbia, concerning Leticia."	Nereu Ramos (1888–1958); Brazil
	Cândido Rondon	5 May 1865; Santo Antônio do Leverger, Mato Grosso, Brazil	19 April 1958; Rio de Janeiro, Brazil	1957	"for his splendid work for the civilization of Indians in Brazil, in addition he did much for cordiality and world peace as in de conflicts of Leticia between Peru and Colombia."	Mario Faria (Note: M. Faria's nomination of Candido Mariano de Silva Rondon was joined by other professors of law at the University of Santos.) (?); Brazil
	Cândido Rondon	5 May 1865; Santo Antônio do Leverger, Mato Grosso, Brazil	19 April 1958; Rio de Janeiro, Brazil	1957	"for his outstanding work for the civilization of Indians in Brazil, among whom he had lived for many years and having done much for cordiality and world peace as in the conflicts of Leticia between Peru and Columbia."	Henry P. De Vries (1911–1986); United States
	Cândido Rondon	5 May 1865; Santo Antônio do Leverger, Mato Grosso, Brazil	19 April 1958; Rio de Janeiro, Brazil	1957	"for his activities in favour of the Indians of Brazil and for promoting peace while acting as a president of the Arbitration Committee in the conflict between Columbia and Peru, concerning Leticia."	Raul Jobim Bittencourt (1902–1985); Brazil
	Cândido Rondon	5 May 1865; Santo Antônio do Leverger, Mato Grosso, Brazil	19 April 1958; Rio de Janeiro, Brazil	1957	"for his lengthy work in Brazil where he demonstrated extraordinary qualities by helping to ensure Peace."	Damião Peres (1889–1976); Portugal
	Cândido Rondon	5 May 1865; Santo Antônio do Leverger, Mato Grosso, Brazil	19 April 1958; Rio de Janeiro, Brazil	1957	"for his extraordinary humanitarian work on behalf of the indigenous people in Brazil, and his efforts to restore peace during the conflicts of Leticia between Peru and Columbia."	Cesar Salay (?); Cuba
	Hélder Câmara	7 February 1909; Fortaleza, Ceará, Brazil	27 August 1999; Recife, Pernambuco, Brazil	1970	"for his work to promote development as a foundation for peace and his belief that progress must be made in a non-violent way."	Brendan Corish (1918–1990); Ireland
	Hélder Câmara	7 February 1909; Fortaleza, Ceará, Brazil	27 August 1999; Recife, Pernambuco, Brazil	1970	"for his work to promote development as a foundation for peace and his belief that progress must be made in a non-violent way."	14 members of the Irish Parliament
	Cláudio Villas-Bôas	8 December 1916; Botucatu, São Paulo, Brazil	1 March 1998; São Paulo, Brazil	1971, (Note: Claudio and Orlando Villas-Bôas was also nominated by 2 professors from the University of Paris for the 1971 Nobel Peace Prize.) 1972, 1973	"in recognition of their lifelong struggle to save the Indians in Amazonia, and their unique achievements in approaching and pacifying primitive tribes and protecting them in Brazil's first national park."	Alan Lennox-Boyd (1904–1983); United Kingdom
	Orlando Villas-Bôas	12 January 1914; Santa Cruz do Rio Pardo, São Paulo, Brazil	12 December 2002; São Paulo, Brazil	1971, 1972, 1973	"in recognition of their lifelong struggle to save the Indians in Amazonia, and their unique achievements in approaching and pacifying primitive tribes and protecting them in Brazil's first national park."	Alan Lennox-Boyd (1904–1983); United Kingdom
	Abdias do Nascimento	14 March 1914; Franca, São Paulo, Brazil	23 May 2011; Rio de Janeiro, Brazil	1978	"for his important contributions to black civil rights and Afro-Brazilian culture for several decades in Brazil through art and education."	Gerardo Melo Mourão (1917–2007); Brazil
	Abdias do Nascimento	14 March 1914; Franca, São Paulo, Brazil	23 May 2011; Rio de Janeiro, Brazil	2004	"for his dedications to combat racism in the diverse realms of social and political activism as well as culture and the arts."	Institute of Racial and Environmental Advocacy (Note: The nomination was lead its director, Humberto Adami (b. 1958).)
	Abdias do Nascimento	14 March 1914; Franca, São Paulo, Brazil	23 May 2011; Rio de Janeiro, Brazil	2009	"for his major contributions to Négritude and Pan-African movements, and for his efforts to end and resist racial discrimination in Brazil."	Clóvis Brigagão (Note: Brigagão's nomination of A. do Nascimento was endorsed by over 130 people and institutions, Brazilian and foreign. In addition to the 132 letters of endorsement from academics, politicians, university presidents, civil society organizations and dignitaries in Brazil and abroad, a petition in support of the nomination received more than 660 adhesions in less than two months.) (?); Portugal
	Chico Xavier	2 April 1910; Pedro Leopoldo, Minas Gerais, Brazil	30 June 2002; Uberaba, Minas Gerais, Brazil	1981, 1982	"for his contributions to Spiritist movement and for his outstanding charity towards the poor in Brazil."	
	Dulce de Souza Pontes, S.M.I.C.	26 May 1914; Salvador, Bahia, Brazil	13 March 1992; Salvador, Bahia, Brazil	1988, 1992	"for her tireless caring of the poor and defending the rights of workers in Bahia."	José Sarney (b. 1930); Brazil
	Paulo Evaristo Arns, O.F.M.	14 September 1921; Forquilhinha, Santa Catarina, Brazil	14 December 2016; São Paulo, Brazil	1989	"for his courageous struggle and relentless opposition against the Brazilian military dictatorship and its human rights abuses."	
	Paulo Freire	19 September 1921; Recife, Pernambuco, Brazil	2 May 1997; São Paulo, Brazil	1993	"for helping people both through his philosophy and his practice of critical pedagogy."	
	Herbert de Souza	3 November 1935; Bocaiúva, Minas Gerais, Brazil	9 August 1997; Rio de Janeiro, Brazil	1994	"for having carried out various activities in defense of human rights and action against economic injustices and government corruption."	
	52 Brazilian women (part of the 1000 PeaceWomen) (Note: The 52 Brazilian women who formed part in the 1000 PeaceWomen were Albertina Duarte Takiuti (b. 1946), Alzira Rufino (b. 1949), Ana Maria Machado (b. 1941), Ana Montenegro (1915–2006), Benedita da Silva (b. 1942), Concita Maia (b. 1951), Creuza Maria Oliveira (b. 1957), Eliane Potiguara (b. 1950), Elizabeth Teixeira (b. 1925), Elza Berquó (?), Elzita Santos de Santa Cruz Oliveira (1914–?), Eva Alterman Blay (b. 1937), Fátima Oliveira (b. 1953), Givânia Maria da Silva (?), Heleieth Saffioti (1934–2010), Helena Greco (1916–2011), Heloneida Studart (1932–2007), Mãe Hilda Jitolu (1923–2009), Jacqueline Pitanguy (b. 1946), Joenia Wapichana (b. 1974), Jurema Batista (b. 1957), Lair Guerra de Macedo (b. 1943), Leila Linhares Barsted (b. 1945), Lenira Maria de Carvalho (?), Luci Teresinha Choinacki (b. 1954), Luiza Erundina (b. 1934), Maninha Xukuru (b. 1966), Mara Régia di Perna (b. 1952), Margarida Genevois (b. 1923), Maria Amélia de Almeida Teles (b. 1944), Maria Berenice Dias (b. 1948), Maria José de Oliveira Araújo (b. 1949), Maria José Mota (b. 1944), Maria José Rosado Nunes (b. 1945), Mãe Stella de Oxóssi (1925–2018), Marina Silva (b. 1958), Mayana Zatz (b. 1947), Moema Libera Viezzer (b. 1939), Niède Guidon (b. 1933), Nilza Iraci (b. 1950), Procópia dos Santos Rosa (b. 1933), Raimunda Gomes da Silva (b. 1940), Rose Marie Muraro (1930–2014), Ruth de Souza (1921–2019), Maria Aparecida Schumaher (b. 1952), Silvia Pimentel (b. 1940), Sueli Pereira Pini (b. 1960), Therezinha Zerbini (1928–2015), Vanete Almeida (b. 1943), Zenilda Maria de Araújo (b. 1950), Zilda Arns Neumann (1934–2010) and Zuleika Alambert (1922–2012).)	began in 2003 in Bern, Switzerland		2005	"in recognition of women's efforts and visibility in promoting peace all over the world."	Ruth-Gaby Vermont-Mangold (b. 1941); Switzerland
	Zilda Arns Neumann	25 August 1934; Forquilhinha, Santa Catarina, Brazil	12 January 2010; Port-au-Prince, Haiti	2005	being part of the 1000 PeaceWomen	Ruth-Gaby Vermont-Mangold (b. 1941); Switzerland
	Zilda Arns Neumann	25 August 1934; Forquilhinha, Santa Catarina, Brazil	12 January 2010; Port-au-Prince, Haiti	2006	"for her humanitarian work on behalf of Pastoral da Criança."	
	Augusto Boal	16 March 1931; Rio de Janeiro, Brazil	2 May 2009; Rio de Janeiro, Brazil	2008	"for the importance of his work, considerably helping expand the use and practice of Theatre of the Oppressed techniques for the benefit of many oppressed people and communities."	
	Flávio Duncan	12 September 1979; Rio de Janeiro, Brazil	—N/a	2012	"in recognition of his social engagements and innovative projects benefitting thousands of youths and children."	
	Gaetano Brancati Luigi (Note: Gaetano Brancati Luigi was born in Italy, but has lived in Brazil since 1949, when he was 12 years old. His family migrated from Europe to South America in search of better living conditions, because of the results of World War II.)	Italy	—N/a	2015	"for his work in sowing the culture of peace on all continents."	
	Maria da Penha	1 February 1945; Fortaleza, Ceará, Brazil	—N/a	2017	"for her courageous commitment to end domestic violence against women."	
	Luiz Inácio Lula da Silva	27 October 1945; Caetés, Pernambuco, Brazil	—N/a	2018	"for throughout his social commitments to trade unions and as a politician, he has developed public policies to overcome hunger and poverty in his country."	Adolfo Pérez Esquivel (b. 1931); Argentina
	Luiz Gabriel Tiago	—N/a	—N/a	2018	"for his social actions in Brazil and abroad on behalf of his enterprise, Pontinho de Luz."	Célio Celli de Oliveira Lima (?); Brazil
	Raoni Metuktire	c. 1932; Kapot Indigenous Territory, Mato Grosso, Brazil	—N/a	2020	"for a lifetime of work protecting the Amazon rainforest."	Darcy Ribeiro Foundation
	Moura Ribeiro	28 September 1953; Santos, São Paulo, Brazil	—N/a	2020	"for his application of humanistic capitalism in the judicial activity."	Ricardo Sayeg (b. 1967); Brazil
	Alysson Paolinelli	10 July 1936; Bambuí, Minas Gerais, Brazil	—N/a	2021	"for his efforts, as an agronomist, to reduce hunger in the country and in the world."	Durval Dourado Neto (?); Brazil
Economic Sciences
	Celso Furtado	26 July 1920; Pombal, Paraíba, Brazil	20 November 2004; Rio de Janeiro, Brazil	2004	"for his research on development and underdevelopment and on the persistence of poverty in peripheral countries throughout the world – a key contribution to economic structuralism."	Eduardo Campos (1965–2014) Brazil; Luiz Inácio Lula da Silva (b. 1945) Brazil

== Nominators ==
The following list of Brazilian-based organizations and individuals became nominators of various candidates, local and international, for the Nobel Prize.

Image	Nominator	Born	Died	Nominee	Motivation	Year Nominated
Physics
	Carlos Chagas	9 July 1879; Oliveira, Minas Gerais, Brazil	8 November 1934; Rio de Janeiro, Brazil	Donald William Kerst (1911–1993); United States	"for the development of the betatron, a novel type of particle accelerator used to accelerate electrons."	1947
Physiology or Medicine
	Braut P. Lewe	—N/a	—N/a	Carlos Finlay (1833–1915); Cuba	"for work on the transmission of yellow fever."	1912
	Pirajá da Silva	28 January 1873; Camamu, Bahia, Brazil	1 March 1961; São Paulo, Brazil	Carlos Chagas (1879–1934); Brazil	"for his discovery of a new trypanosome disease (thyroidite parasitaire)."	1913
	Hilário de Gouvêa	23 September 1843; Caeté, Minas Gerais, Brazil	25 October 1923; Rio de Janeiro, Brazil	Carlos Chagas (1879–1934); Brazil	"for his research on malaria and paludism, and the discovery of Trypanozoma cruzi."	1921
	C. S. de Magalhães	—N/a	—N/a	Patrick Manson (1844–1922); United Kingdom	"for his work in the field of tropical medicine."	1921
	J. A. Pupo	—N/a	—N/a	Constantin Levaditi (1874–1953); Romania	"for his work on experimental syphilis."	1924
	Martin Ficker	17 November 1868; Sohland an der Spree, Saxony, Germany	22 November 1950; São Paulo, Brazil	Hermann Rein (1898–1953); Germany	"for his work on blood circulation."	1936
	Octávio Coelho de Magalhães	31 January 1880; Rio de Janeiro, Brazil	16 June 1972; Rio de Janeiro, Brazil	Adolfo Lutz (1855–1940); Brazil	"for his work on tropical diseases (lepra, sporotrichosis, yellow fever, malaria) and their transmission."	1938
	Flamínio Fávero	26 October 1895; São Paulo, Brazil	12 February 1982; São Paulo, Brazil	Walter Bradford Cannon (1871–1945); United States	"for his research on the secretion of adrenalin and its relation to the sympathetic nervous system."	1941
	Franklin de Moura Campos	26 October 1896; Tietê, São Paulo, Brazil	4 October 1962; São Paulo, Brazil	Walter Bradford Cannon (1871–1945); United States	"for his research on the secretion of adrenalin and its relation to the sympathetic nervous system."	1941
	Luciano Gualberto	14 January 1883; Petrópolis, Rio de Janeiro, Brazil	21 September 1959; São Paulo, Brazil	Walter Bradford Cannon (1871–1945); United States	"for his research on the secretion of adrenalin and its relation to the sympathetic nervous system."	1941
	Renato Locchi	7 May 1896; Anhembi, São Paulo, Brazil	21 May 1978; São Paulo, Brazil	Walter Bradford Cannon (1871–1945); United States	"for his research on the secretion of adrenalin and its relation to the sympathetic nervous system."	1941
	Renato Locchi	7 May 1896; Anhembi, São Paulo, Brazil	21 May 1978; São Paulo, Brazil	António Egas Moniz (1874–1955); Portugal	"for his research on surgical treatment of functional mental disorders and diagnosis of brain tumors by means of arterial encephalography."	1949
	L. da Cunha Motta	Brazil	Brazil	Harry Goldblatt (1891–1977); United States	"for his experimental method of producing hypertension through renal ischemia."	1941
	L. da Cunha Motta	Brazil	Brazil	Irvine Page (1901–1991); United States	"for his studies on experimental arterial hypertension."	1941
	Antônio de Almeida Prado	13 June 1889; Itu, São Paulo, Brazil	7 June 1965; São Paulo, Brazil	Walter Bradford Cannon (1871–1945); United States	"for his research on the secretion of adrenalin and its relation to the sympathetic nervous system."	1941
	Antônio de Almeida Prado	13 June 1889; Itu, São Paulo, Brazil	7 June 1965; São Paulo, Brazil	António Egas Moniz (1874–1955); Portugal	"for his work on surgical treatment of mental disorders and on cerebral angiography."	1950
	Henrique Roxo	4 July 1877; Rio de Janeiro, Brazil	17 February 1969; Rio de Janeiro, Brazil	Manuel de Abreu (1894–1962); Brazil	"for his introduction of collective radiology photography: abreugraphy."	1946
	Alfredo Pereira Monteiro	15 May 1891; Rio de Janeiro, Brazil	9 February 1961; Rio de Janeiro, Brazil	Manuel de Abreu (1894–1962); Brazil	"for his introduction of collective radiology photography: abreugraphy."	1946
	Arnaldo de Moraes	28 August 1893; Rio de Janeiro, Brazil	6 April 1961; Rio de Janeiro, Brazil	Manuel de Abreu (1894–1962); Brazil	"for his introduction of collective radiology photography: abreugraphy."	1946
	Ugo Pinheiro Guimarães	12 March 1901; Rio de Janeiro, Brazil	29 December 1992; Rio de Janeiro, Brazil	Manuel de Abreu (1894–1962); Brazil	"for his introduction of collective radiology photography: abreugraphy."	1946
	Agenor Porto	Brazil	Brazil	Bernardo Alberto Houssay (1887–1971); Argentina	"for his discovery of the physiological role of the anterior hypophysis in carbohydrate metabolism and diabetes, work on heart sounds, the relation of the kidney to hypertension, work on the adrenal glands, thymus, thyreoidea and snake venom."	1946
	Agenor Porto	Brazil	Brazil	Bernardo Alberto Houssay (1887–1971); Argentina	"for his work on endocrine secretion, role of the kidney in arterial hypertension, and work on snake venom."	1947
	Ernesto de Sousa Campos	21 September 1882; Campinas, São Paulo, Brazil	1 January 1970; São Paulo, Brazil	António Egas Moniz (1874–1955); Portugal	"for his research on surgical treatment of functional mental disorders and diagnosis of brain tumors by means of arterial encephalography."	1949
	Jayme Periera	—N/a	—N/a	António Egas Moniz (1874–1955); Portugal	"for his research on surgical treatment of functional mental disorders and diagnosis of brain tumors by means of arterial encephalography."	1949
	Raul Carlos Briquet	8 February 1887; Limeira, São Paulo, Brazil	5 September 1953; São Paulo, Brazil	Edwin Joseph Cohn (1892–1953); United States	"for his research on the fractionation of plasma proteins, and their therapeutic use."	1950
	Francisco d'Ovidio	—N/a	—N/a	Manuel de Abreu (1894–1962); Brazil	No motivation given.	1953
	Paulo Tibiriçá	—N/a	—N/a	Hans Selye (1907–1982); Canada	No motivation given.	1953
	Paulo Moreira	—N/a	—N/a	Hans Selye (1907–1982); Canada	No motivation given.	1953
	Luiz Francisco Guerra Blessmann	10 December 1891; Alegrete, Rio Grande do Sul, Brazil	—N/a	Hans Selye (1907–1982); Canada	No motivation given.	1953
Literature
	Imperial Academy of Fine Arts	founded in 1816 in Rio de Janeiro, Brazil		Guglielmo Ferrero (1871–1942); Italy	Between Two Worlds (1913); The Greatness and Decline of Rome, vol. 1–5 (1907–1909); Peace and War (1933); The Two Truths (1933–39)	1923
	Academia Brasileira de Letras	founded on 20 July 1897 in Rio de Janeiro, Brazil		Henrique Coelho Neto (1864–1934); Brazil	O Rajá de Pendjab (1898); O Morto, Memórias de um Fuzilado (1898); Theatro, vol. I–V (1897–1909); Mano, Livro da Saudade (1924)	1933
	Academia Brasileira de Letras	founded on 20 July 1897 in Rio de Janeiro, Brazil		Enrique Larreta (1875–1961); Argentina	La Gloria de Don Ramiro (1908); La que buscaba Don Juan (1923); Santa Maria del Buen Aire: Drama en Tres Actos (1935)	1942
	Academia Brasileira de Letras	founded on 20 July 1897 in Rio de Janeiro, Brazil		Júlio Dantas (1876–1962); Portugal	A Ceia dos Cardeais (1902); La Cortina Verde (1919); A Severa (1931); Pecado (1951)	1951
	Paul V. Shaw	—N/a	—N/a	Flávio de Carvalho (1899–1973); Brazil	A Cidade do Homem Nu (1930); Dança do Deus Morto (1933)	1939
	Francisco de Aquino Correia, S.D.B.	2 April 1885; Cuiabá, Mato Grosso, Brazil	22 March 1956; São Paulo, Brazil	Manoel Wanderley (prob. Manuel Bandeira (1886–1968))		1941
	Afonso Costa	2 August 1885; Jacobina, Bahia, Brazil	30 December 1955; Rio de Janeiro, Brazil	Gabriela Mistral (1889–1957); Chile	Sonetos de la Muerte (1914); Desolación (1922); Ternura (1924); Tala (1938) and Lagar (1954)	1942
	Fidelino de Figueiredo (Note: F. de Figueiredo's nomination was made while he was residing in Brazil and worked as professor of Portuguese literature at the University of São Paulo.)	20 July 1888; Lisbon, Portugal	20 March 1967; Lisbon, Portugal	Alfonso Reyes (1889–1959); Mexico	Cuestiones Estéticas (1911); El Cazador: Ensayos y Divagaciones (1911–20); Visión de Anáhuac (1917); Árbol de Pólvora (1953)	1953
	Paulo de Medeiros	—N/a	—N/a	Ramón Menéndez Pidal (1869–1968); Spain	Crónicas Generales de España (1898); Orígenes del Español (1926); Flor Nueva de Romances Viejos (1928); La España del Cid (1929); Romancero Hispánico: Teoría e Historia (1953)	1956
	Brazilian PEN-Club	founded on 2 April 1936 in Rio de Janeiro, Brazil		Rómulo Gallegos (1884–1969); Venezuela	Doña Bárbara (1929); Cantaclaro (1934); Canaima (1935); El Último Patriota (1957)	1960
	Academia Santista de Letras	founded on 23 June 1956; Santos, São Paulo, Brazil		Pietro Ubaldi (1886–1972); Italy	A Grande Síntese (1932–35); Ascensio Uma (1951); Ascese Mística (1983)	1962, 1963, 1965, 1966, 1967, 1969
	João de Freitas Guimarães	—N/a	—N/a	Pietro Ubaldi (1886–1972); Italy	A Grande Síntese (1932–35); Ascensio Uma (1951); Ascese Mística (1983)	1964
	Academia Mineira de Letras	founded in 1919 in Juiz de Fora, Minas Gerais, Brazil		Alceu Amoroso Lima (1893–1983); Brazil	Mitos de Nosso Tempo (1943); O Existencialismo e Outros Mitos de Nosso Tempo (1951); Meditações Sobre o Mundo Interior (1953); O Humanismo Ameaçado (1965)	1965
	Sociedade Brasileira de Autores Teatrais	founded on 27 September 1917 in Rio de Janeiro, Brazil		Jorge Amado (1912–2001); Brazil	O País do Carnaval (1931); Jubiabá (1935); Capitães da Areia (1937); Terras do Sem Fim (1945); Gabriela, Cravo e Canela (1958); Tieta do Agreste (1977); Farda Fardão Camisola de Dormir (1978)	1967
	Brazilian Writers Association	Brazil		Jorge Amado (1912–2001); Brazil	O País do Carnaval (1931); Jubiabá (1935); Capitães da Areia (1937); Terras do Sem Fim (1945); Gabriela, Cravo e Canela (1958); Tieta do Agreste (1977); Farda Fardão Camisola de Dormir (1978)	1967, 1968
	Antônio Olinto	10 May 1919; Ubá, Minas Gerais, Brazil	12 September 2009; Rio de Janeiro, Brazil	Jorge Amado (1912–2001); Brazil	O País do Carnaval (1931); Jubiabá (1935); Capitães da Areia (1937); Terras do Sem Fim (1945); Gabriela, Cravo e Canela (1958); Tieta do Agreste (1977); Farda Fardão Camisola de Dormir (1978)	1967, 1968, 1969, 1970
	Joracy Camargo	18 October 1898; Rio de Janeiro, Brazil	11 March 1973; Rio de Janeiro, Brazil	Jorge Amado (1912–2001); Brazil	O País do Carnaval (1931); Jubiabá (1935); Capitães da Areia (1937); Terras do Sem Fim (1945); Gabriela, Cravo e Canela (1958); Tieta do Agreste (1977); Farda Fardão Camisola de Dormir (1978)	1969
	Marcos Almir Madeira	21 February 1916; Niterói, Rio de Janeiro, Brazil	19 October 2003; Rio de Janeiro, Brazil	Jorge Amado (1912–2001); Brazil	O País do Carnaval (1931); Jubiabá (1935); Capitães da Areia (1937); Terras do Sem Fim (1945); Gabriela, Cravo e Canela (1958); Tieta do Agreste (1977); Farda Fardão Camisola de Dormir (1978)	1970
Peace
	Carlos Peixoto (Note: The nomination letter for Baron José Paranhos was signed by Carlos Peixoto de Mello and J. de Medeinos, both members of the Brazilian parliament. The Nobel nomination archives only enlisted Peixoto's name as the nominator.)	1 June 1871; Ubá, Minas Gerais, Brazil	29 August 1917; Rio de Janeiro, Brazil	José Paranhos (1845–1912); Brazil	"for his efforts to secure Brazil's borders through several boundary settlements and to solve the conflicts between Brazil and its neighboring countries, and also for participating in the Brazilian abolitionist movement and directly engaging in 27 arbitration treaties."	1911
	J. de Medeinos	—N/a	—N/a	José Paranhos (1845–1912); Brazil	"for his efforts to secure Brazil's borders through several boundary settlements and to solve the conflicts between Brazil and its neighboring countries, and also for participating in the Brazilian abolitionist movement and directly engaging in 27 arbitration treaties."	1911
	Alcindo Guanabara	19 July 1865; Magé, Rio de Janeiro, Brazil	20 August 1918; Rio de Janeiro, Brazil	Érico da Gama Coelho (1849–1922); Brazil	No motivation given. (Note: Guanabara's nomination of É. da Gama Coelho was written in telegram.)	1916
	Joaquim Luís Osório (prob. Osório Duque-Estrada (1870–1927))	—N/a	—N/a	Raimundo Teixeira Mendes (1855–1927); Brazil	"for his role as the leader of 'Eglis positiviste' in Brazil."	1924
	Clóvis Beviláqua	4 October 1859; Viçosa do Ceará, Ceará, Brazil	26 July 1944; Rio de Janeiro, Brazil	Brazilian Historic and Geographic Institute (founded in 1838); Brazil	No motivation given.	1924
	National Congress of Brazil	founded on 6 May 1826 in Brasília, Brazil		Afrânio de Melo Franco (1870–1943); Brazil	"for his role as mediator in the conflict between Colombia and Peru and for having furthered international economic cooperation."	1935
	Edmundo da Luz Pinto (Note: A. de Melo Franco's nomination was signed by E. da Luz Pinto and P. Azevedo whose right to nominate was uncertain. It was Brazilian ambassador to Oslo who submitted the nomination.)	5 January 1898; Rio de Janeiro, Brazil	15 July 1963; Rio de Janeiro, Brazil	Afrânio de Melo Franco (1870–1943); Brazil	"for his role as mediator in the conflict between Colombia and Peru and for having furthered international economic cooperation."	1938
	Mário de Pimentel Brandão	9 October 1889; Rio de Janeiro, Brazil	23 October 1956; Rio de Janeiro, Brazil	Cordell Hull (1871–1955); United States	"for his efforts to improve relations between the United States and Latin America, wherein encouraged détente and a spirit of peace on the American continent through his Pan-American policy, the so-called 'Good Neighbor Policy', and for his efforts to establish a liberal economic policy and to remove international trade restrictions."	1938
	Philadelpho Azevedo	13 March 1894; Rio de Janeiro, Brazil	7 May 1951; The Hague, Netherlands	Afrânio de Melo Franco (1870–1943); Brazil	"for his role as mediator in the conflict between Colombia and Peru."	1938
	Philadelpho Azevedo	13 March 1894; Rio de Janeiro, Brazil	7 May 1951; The Hague, Netherlands	Oswaldo Aranha (1894–1960); Brazil	"for his peace efforts when he was serving as Brazilian ambassador to the United States, and for his work while serving as president of the United Nations General Assembly."	1948
	Americano Jorge	—N/a	—N/a	Oswaldo Aranha (1894–1960); Brazil	"for his peace efforts when he was serving as Brazilian ambassador to the United States, and for his work while serving as president of the United Nations General Assembly."	1948
	40 members of the Brazilian Federal Senate	founded on 6 May 1826 in Brasília, Brazil		Oswaldo Aranha (1894–1960); Brazil	"for his peace efforts when he was serving as Brazilian ambassador to the United States, and for his work while serving as president of the United Nations General Assembly."	1948
	83 members of the Brazilian Chamber of Deputies	founded on 6 May 1826 in Brasília, Brazil		Oswaldo Aranha (1894–1960); Brazil	"for his peace efforts when he was serving as Brazilian ambassador to the United States, and for his work while serving as president of the United Nations General Assembly."	1948
	Hans Jordan	3 March 1892; Joinville, Santa Catarina, Brazil	21 March 1967; Joinville, Santa Catarina, Brazil	Paul Harris (1868–1947); United States	No motivation given.	1947
	Saulo Saul Ramos	22 October 1907; Lages, Santa Catarina, Brazil	11 August 1984; Vassouras, Rio de Janeiro, Brazil	Henrique Vasconcellos (?); Brazil	"for his books on World Government."	1952
	E. L. Viana (Note: E. L. Viana and V. Leal nominated together Josué de Castro but E. L. Viana was the only one cited as nominator by the Nobel nomination archives.)	—N/a	—N/a	Josué de Castro (1908–1973); Brazil	"for his work on increase in population and access to food through his book Geography of Hunger (1952)."	1953
	Victor Nunes Leal	11 November 1914; Carangola, Minas Gerais, Brazil	17 May 1985; Rio de Janeiro, Brazil	Josué de Castro (1908–1973); Brazil	"for his work on increase in population and access to food through his book Geography of Hunger (1952)."	1953
	Sousa Arruda	—N/a	—N/a	Raul Fernandes (1877–1968); Brazil	"for his contribution in establishing The International Court of Justice."	1953
	Haroldo Valladão	5 September 1901; São Paulo, Brazil	7 April 1987; Rio de Janeiro, Brazil	Raul Fernandes (1877–1968); Brazil	"for his contribution in establishing The International Court of Justice."	1953, 1954
	Haroldo Valladão	5 September 1901; São Paulo, Brazil	7 April 1987; Rio de Janeiro, Brazil	The Hague Academy of International Law (founded in 1923); Netherlands	No motivation given.	1973
	Álvaro Pereira de Sousa Lima	23 May 1890; Juiz de Fora, Minas Gerais, Brazil	5 May 1968; São Paulo, Brazil	Cândido Rondon (1865–1958); Brazil	"for promoting peace in the territorial dispute between Colombia and Peru and working with the Indian Protection Service."	1953
	Nereu Ramos	3 September 1888; Lages, Santa Catarina, Brazil	16 June 1958; São José dos Pinhais, Paraná, Brazil	Cândido Rondon (1865–1958); Brazil	"for his outstanding devotion to protect the Indians of Brazil, and his contribution to creating peace in the conflict between Peru and Columbia, concerning Leticia."	1957
	Mario Faria	—N/a	—N/a	Cândido Rondon (1865–1958); Brazil	"for his splendid work for the civilization of Indians in Brazil, in addition he did much for cordiality and world peace as in de conflicts of Leticia between Peru and Colombia."	1957
	Raul Jobim Bittencourt	2 January 1902; Porto Alegre, Rio Grande do Sul, Brazil	20 March 1985; Rio de Janeiro, Brazil	Cândido Rondon (1865–1958); Brazil	"for his activities in favour of the Indians of Brazil and for promoting peace while acting as a president of the Arbitration Committee in the conflict between Columbia and Peru, concerning Leticia."	1957
	Carlos Domingues	5 May 1896; Recife, Pernambuco, Brazil	22 February 1974; Rio de Janeiro, Brazil	Universal Esperanto Association (founded in 1908); Netherlands	"for its successful efforts in developing admirable activity in favour of international understanding and world peace."	1961, 1963
	Pedro Calmon	23 December 1902; Amargosa, Bahia, Brazil	16 June 1985; Rio de Janeiro, Brazil	Universal Esperanto Association (founded in 1908); Netherlands	"for its successful efforts in developing admirable activity in favour of international understanding and world peace."	1961
	Pedro Calmon	23 December 1902; Amargosa, Bahia, Brazil	16 June 1985; Rio de Janeiro, Brazil	Habib Bourguiba (1903–2000); Tunisia	"for his efforts towards a peaceful coexistence between the Arab world and Israel."	1966
	Carlos Dunshee de Abranches	1913; Brazil	1983; Brazil	Organization of American States (founded in 1948); United States	No motivation given.	1967
	Moacyr de Oliveira	—N/a	—N/a	International Labour Organization (founded in 1919); Switzerland	"for its work for peace by promoting social justice."	1969
	Jarbas Passarinho	11 January 1920; Xapuri, Acre, Brazil	5 June 2016; Brasília, Brazil	International Labour Organization (founded in 1919); Switzerland	"for its contribution to world peace by its work for social justice."	1969
	Vanessa Grazziotin	29 June 1961; Videira, Santa Catarina, Brazil	—N/a	Edward Snowden (b. 1983); United States	"for exposing the extent of electronic surveillance of citizens across the world, wherein he has restored the fundamental principle of transparency to democracy."	2014
	Darcy Ribeiro Foundation	founded in 1996 in Rio de Janeiro, Brazil		Raoni Metuktire (b. 1932); Brazil	"for a lifetime of work protecting the Amazon rainforest."	2020
