= 2020 Nobel Peace Prize =

- World Food Programme (WFP)
- "for its efforts to combat hunger, for its contribution to bettering conditions for peace in conflict-affected areas and for acting as a driving force in efforts to prevent the use of hunger as a weapon of war and conflict."
- Date: 9 October 2020 (announcement by Berit Reiss-Andersen); 10 December 2020 (ceremony)
- Location: Oslo, Norway
- Presented by: Norwegian Nobel Committee
- Reward: 10.0 million SEK
- First award: 1901
- Website: Official website

The 2020 Nobel Peace Prize was awarded to the World Food Programme (founded in 1961) by the Norwegian Nobel Committee. The announcement was made on Friday 9 October at 11:00 CEST.

== Candidates ==
There were 318 candidates for the 2020 Nobel Peace Prize (211 individuals and 107 organizations), which is the fourth largest number in the history of the prize. However, the Norwegian Nobel Committee does not reveal the names of nominators nor of the nominees for the Nobel Peace Prize before 50 years have passed. Full professors in relevant academic fields and national-level politicians in any country may propose candidates, and it does not require an invitation to submit a nomination; sometimes nominators make their proposals public, but the committee does not verify nominations.

=== Nominations confirmed by various news agencies ===
Individuals
Nominee	Country	Motivations	Nominator(s)	Source
Loujain al-Hathloul (b. 1989)	Saudi Arabia	"for her peaceful struggle for the equal rights of women in Saudi Arabia"	8 members of U.S. House of Representatives	
Jacinda Ardern (b. 1980)	New Zealand	"for her quick response to tackle the situation after the Christchurch terror attack"		
Julian Assange (b. 1971)	Australia	"for having exposed the architecture of abuse and war and fortified the architecture of peace despite the risks and sacrifices"	17 members of the German Parliament	
Chelsea Manning (b. 1987)	United States	"for having exposed the architecture of abuse and war and fortified the architecture of peace despite the risks and sacrifices"	17 members of the German Parliament	
Edward Snowden (b. 1983)	United States	"for having exposed the architecture of abuse and war and fortified the architecture of peace despite the risks and sacrifices"	17 members of the German Parliament	
Leila de Lima (b. 1959)	Philippines	"for her campaign against extrajudicial killings and stand against dictatorial regimes"	Hakima El Haite (b. 1963)	
Maggie Gobran (b. 1949)	Egypt	"in recognition of her constant commitment and dedication to serving illiterate and poor women throughout Egypt"	Garnett Genuis (b. 1987)	
Nicolò Govoni (b. 1993)	Italy	"for dedicating his life to the support and protection of children's rights"	Sara Conti (b. 1979)	
Greta Thunberg (b. 2003)	Sweden	"[with FFM] for their tireless work to make politicians open their eyes to global climate crisis"	Håkan Svenneling (b. 1985); Jens Holm (b. 1971)	

Organisations
Arctic Council (founded in 1996)	Norway	"for leading intergovernmental forums for cooperation, coordination and interaction among the countries on common Arctic issues"	
Fridays for Future Movement (founded in 2018)	Sweden	"[with Thunberg] for their tireless work to make politicians open their eyes to global climate crisis"	Håkan Svenneling (b. 1985); Jens Holm (b. 1971)
People of Hong Kong	Hong Kong	"for the community's fight for freedom of speech and basic democracy"	Guri Melby (b. 1981)
International Space Station (ISS)	United States; Russia; Japan; Europe; Canada	"for space-faring nations' multinational effort to work together in a focused peaceful enterprise to design, launch, assemble, and operate an outpost for humans at the edge of space"	Kårstein Eidem Løvaas (b. 1967)
World Health Organization (WHO) (founded in 1948)	United States	"for its efforts to address the global COVID-19 pandemic"	

== Nobel Committee ==
Tasked with reviewing nominations from September of the previous year through 1 February and ultimately selecting the Prize winners, The Norwegian Parliament-appointed members of the Norwegian Nobel Committee at the time of the 2020 prize were listed as:

- Berit Reiss-Andersen (chair, born 1954), advocate (barrister) and president of the Norwegian Bar Association, former state secretary for the Minister of Justice and the Police (representing the Labour Party). Member of the Norwegian Nobel Committee since 2012, reappointed for the period 2018–2023.
- Henrik Syse (vice chair, born 1966), Research Professor at the Peace Research Institute Oslo. Member of the Committee since 2015, appointed for the period 2015–2020.
- Thorbjørn Jagland (born 1950), former Prime Minister and Member of Parliament for the Labour Party, former President of the Storting during Jens Stoltenberg's second term; as well as a former Secretary General of the Council of Europe. Chair of the Norwegian Nobel Committee from 2009 to 2015. Currently a regular member. Member of the Committee since 2009, reappointed for the period 2015–2020.
- Anne Enger (born 1949), former Leader of the Centre Party and Minister of Culture. Appointed for the period 2018–2020.
- Asle Toje (born 1974), foreign policy scholar. Appointed for the period 2018–2023.
