= Manuel de Abreu =

Brazilian physician (1892–1962)

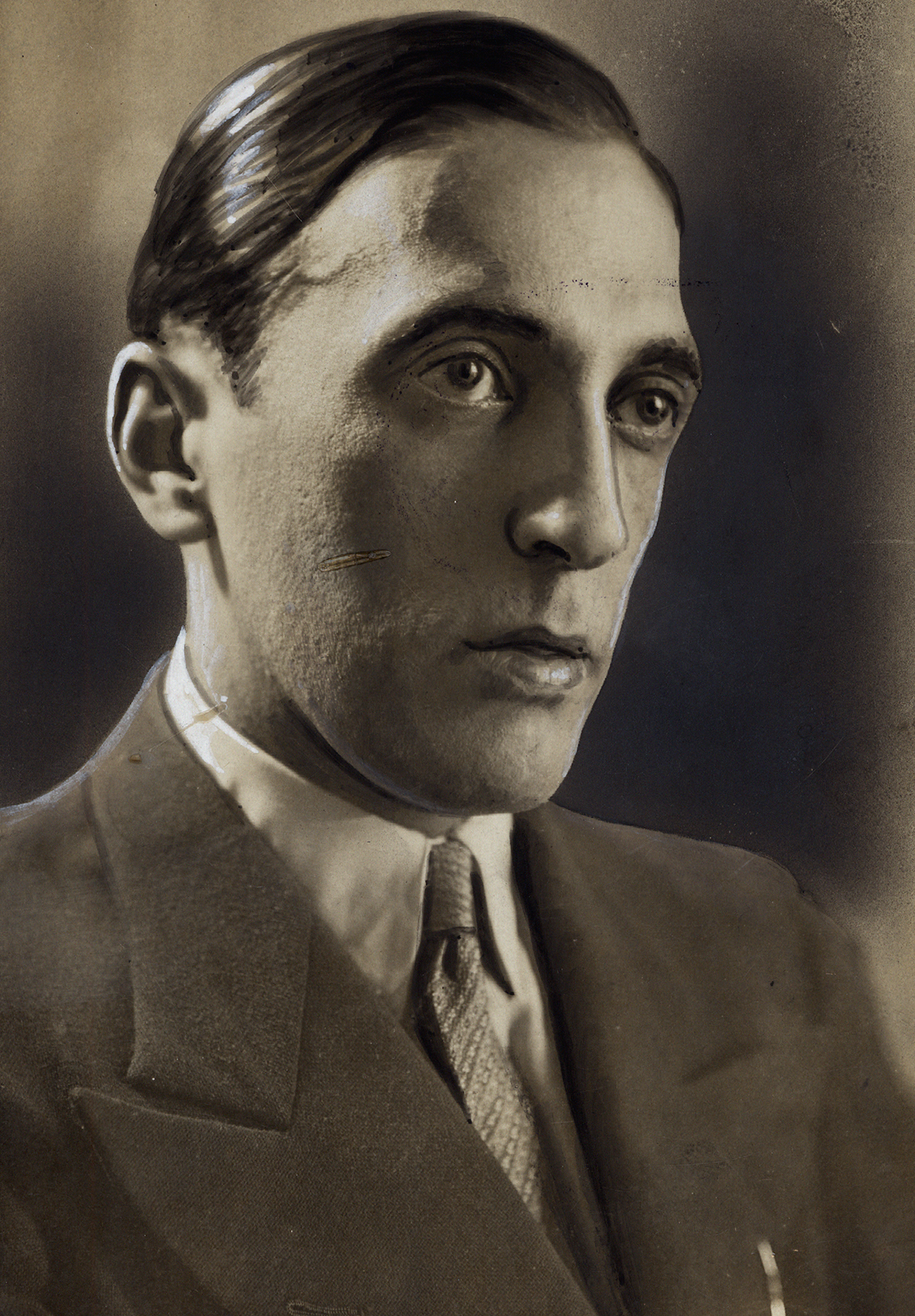
- Manuel de Abreu in 1942
- Born: January 4, 1892; São Paulo, Brazil
- Died: January 30, 1962 (aged 71); Rio de Janeiro
- Known for: Abreugraphy
- Scientific career
- Fields: Medicine

Manuel Dias de Abreu (January 4, 1892 – January 30, 1962) was a Brazilian physician and scientist, the inventor of abreugraphy, a rapid radiography of the lungs for screening tuberculosis. He is considered one of the most important Brazilian physicians, side by side with Carlos Chagas, Vital Brazil and Oswaldo Cruz.

== Early career ==
Abreu was born in São Paulo, Brazil, and obtained his M.D. in medicine at the Federal University of Rio de Janeiro in 1914. Shortly afterwards, he travelled to France, where he first worked in the service of Dr. Louis Gaston, at the Nouvel Hôpital de la Pitié, in 1915. Charged with photographing surgical pathology specimens, Abreu quickly developed new and better devices and methods for this. In 1916, Abreu started to work at the Hôtel-Dieu and had his first contact with medical radiography, which had been discovered by the German physicist Wilhelm Röntgen just 20 years before. He became the director of the laboratory of radiology of the hospital in substitution to the previous director, Dr. Jean Guilleminot, who was conscripted to fight in the First World War. It was in this position, by suggestion of Guilleminot, that Abreu became interest in fluorography, or the photographic recording of fluoroscopic x-ray images of the lungs. He soon was able to perceive the immense diagnostic value of these images for tuberculosis and other pulmonary affections, and he began his photographic studies of the lungs in 1918, now at the Laennec Hospital (also in France).

Abreu's first landmark contribution to the radiography of soft tissues (until then not much utilized as a diagnostic radiographical method, due to the low definition of images) was to develop an x-ray densitometry method, by comparing the degree of white density of biological tissues to water's and to other highly dense references, such as bones, and to point out its value for radiodiagnosis. In 1921 he first published his pioneering work on the radiological interpretation of pulmonary injuries in pleuropulmonary tuberculosis, titled "Le Radiodiagnostic dans la Tuberculose Pleuro-Pulmonaire". This and his method of pulmonary densitometry gave him an invitation to join the prestigious Académie de Médicine de Paris.

In 1922 Abreu returned to Brazil and accepted a post as the head of the X-Ray Department at the Federal public health service for the prophylaxis of tuberculosis in Rio de Janeiro. The city was at that time going through a devastating epidemic of tuberculosis. He intensified research on thoracic radiography for the purpose of early diagnosis of tubercular lesions, but the results were initially discouraging, due to the low quality of fluoroscopic images at the time.

== Mid career ==
As a result of the improvements of fluoroscopic and photographic devices and techniques, in 1935 he took again his experiences in the old German Hospital of Rio de Janeiro, and was then able to conceive a cheap and fast method to take small (50 or 100 mm) photographic plates of lungs in a single roll of film, which became a standard tool for an easier diagnosis of tuberculosis for many decades to come, with a corresponding impact on its prophylaxis and cure.

Abreu's ideas for a new mass screening radiography apparatus was made true by the construction of a first device by the Lohner House, a representative of Siemens in Rio de Janeiro. The first service of Thoracic Census was established in 1937. The first results indicated the usefulness of abreugraphy: the screening of 758 asymptomatic and apparently sane individuals in July 1937 revealed that 44 of them had already tuberculosis lung lesions, which allowed for early treatment and a better survival. Mobile units were also employed, and soon abreugraphy became a mandatory examination for anyone applying to a public job or school in Brazil. By the end of the 1940s, Dr. Manuel de Abreu could present the first positive impact of mass screening on tuberculosis mortality.

== Abreugraphy ==
The invention was named abreugrafia in his honor by the Society of Medicine and Surgery of Rio de Janeiro in 1936. Abreugraphy was largely discontinued as a mandatory screening tool in Brazil in the 1970s, after antibiotic treatment and public health programs greatly decreased the incidence of the disease, and also out of fear of unnecessary exposure to x-rays, particularly in children and pregnant woman. The World Health Organization recommended its discontinuance and the Brazilian health service stopped to pay for it in 1999.

Abreugraphy was not used in other countries so intensively as in Brazil and a few other Latin America countries. It received several different names, according to the country where it was adopted: mass radiography, miniature chest radiograph (United Kingdom and United States), roentgenfluorography (Germany), radiophotography (France), schermografia (Italy), photoradioscopy (Spain) and photofluorography (Sweden). The importance of abreugraphy was outlined by the creation of the Brazilian Society of Abreugraphy, in 1957, and the publication of the Revista Brasileira de Abreugrafia.

== Further accomplishments ==
Abreu was also one of the first radiographists to develop quantitative methods to evaluate the area of internal anatomical structures and to use it in medical diagnosis, an approach which he used to quantitate images of the mediastinum, and which he named radiogeometry. His ideas were collected and published in 1928 in his book "Essai sur une nouvelle Radiologie Vasculaire". Furthermore, Abreu was instrumental in developing new techniques for x-ray planar tomography of the thorax using the simultaneous exposure of several films, as well as the use of tracheobronchic washout as technique for precise detection of Koch bacilli in infected individuals.

Manuel Dias de Abreu lectured in the field of medical radiology in innumerable Brazilian and foreign scientific institutions, and was a member of the most important medical organizations of the world. He was awarded the French Légion d'Honneur and several other scientific prizes, among them the Gold Medal of the American College of Chest Physicians, in 1950 and the Gold Medal of the Argentinian Radiological Society, in 1953.

Besides several books on medicine, Abreu published also two poetical works: Substâncias, which was illustrated by famous Brazilian painter Emiliano Di Cavalcanti and Poemas sem Realidade, illustrated by himself.

Tragically (and ironically, for a pneumologist), Dr Abreu, a smoker, died in Rio de Janeiro in 1962 from lung cancer.

== Quotation ==
The value of life is within the value of science, outside life, science has no finality

— Manuel de Abreu
