= 1965 Nobel Peace Prize =

Award

- United Nations Children's Fund (UNICEF)
- "for its effort to enhance solidarity between nations and reduce the difference between rich and poor states."
- Date: 26 October 1965 (announcement); 10 December 1965 (ceremony)
- Location: Oslo, Norway
- Presented by: Norwegian Nobel Committee
- First award: 1901
- Website: Official website

The 1965 Nobel Peace Prize was awarded to the United Nations agency United Nations Children's Fund (UNICEF) (founded in 1946) "for its effort to enhance solidarity between nations and reduce the difference between rich and poor states." The agency became the eighth organization awarded with a Nobel Prize.

== Laureate ==
UNICEF is the successor of the United Nations International Children's Emergency Fund, created on 11 December 1946, in New York, by the U.N. Relief Rehabilitation Administration to provide emergency relief to children and mothers affected by World War II. That same year, the U.N. General Assembly established the agency to further institutionalize post-war relief work, focusing later on providing food, clothing, and medicine to mothers and children in war-torn Europe, China and Palestine. The organization began setting longer-term goals for emerging nations at the beginning of the 1950s. It introduced initiatives for mothers and newborns, provided dietary guidance, supplied vitamin-rich food, and fought diseases. In support of these initiatives, UNICEF established projects to guarantee children's and adolescents' attendance at school as well as thousands of health stations throughout the developing globe. The organization's work was strengthened when the U.N. adopted a Declaration of the Rights of the Child in 1959. The Norwegian Nobel Committee believes that UNICEF's initiatives were a turning point in international cooperation that lessened the gap between wealthy and developing countries, and the threat of war.

== Deliberations ==
=== Nominations ===
UNICEF received twelve nominations in total since 1950. In 1965, it earned three distinct nominations from two Norwegian politicians (Berte Rognerud and Gudmund Harlem) and 4 members of the Yugoslavian parliament.

In total, the Norwegian Nobel Committee received 78 nominations 24 individuals and 7 organizations such as Vinoba Bhave, Martin Buber (who died months before the announcement), Norman Cousins, Danilo Dolci, Institut de Droit International (awarded in 1904) and Universal Esperanto Association. Nine of the nominees were nominated for the first time such as Pope Paul VI, Shigeru Yoshida, U Thant, Galo Plaza, Arne Geijer and The Salvation Army. No women were nominated that year. Notable figures like Viola Desmond, Nikolaus Ehlen, Leopold Figl, Felix Frankfurter and Malcolm X died in 1965 without having been nominated for the peace prize while the American politician Adlai Stevenson II died before the only chance to be rewarded.

Official list of nominees and their nominators for the prize
No.	Nominee	Country/ Headquarters	Motivations	Nominator(s)
Individuals
1	Vinoba Bhave (1895–1982)	India	"for his work for peace through law."	Dominique Pire, O.P. (1910–1969)
2	Charles Braibant (1889–1976)	France	"for his work in the cause of peace through his writings with a strong pacifist conviction."	René Pleven (1901–1993)
3	Martin Buber (1878–1965)	Austria; Israel	No motivation included.	Michael Landmann (1913–1984)
4	Frederick Burdick (?)(prob. Eugene Burdick (1918–1965))	United States	"as publisher and editor of the Gist, which primary purpose is the setting forth of constructive ideas for making a better America and maintaining a free world."	Roland V. Libonati (1897–1991)
4	Frederick Burdick (?)(prob. Eugene Burdick (1918–1965))	United States	"as publisher and editor of the Gist, in recognition of his outstanding accomplishments for the cause of international peace and humanitarianism."	Kenneth J. Gray (1924–2014)
4	Frederick Burdick (?)(prob. Eugene Burdick (1918–1965))	United States	"for his efforts in the cause of world peace."	Philip J. Philbin (1898–1972)
4	Frederick Burdick (?)(prob. Eugene Burdick (1918–1965))	United States	"in recognition of his dedicated work for the cause of world peace and with his devotion to this all important cause, he has accomplished a great deal for its consummation during major crises."	William J. Murphy (1928–2018)
5	David Dove Carver (1903–1974)	United Kingdom	No motivation included.	Maurice Cranston (1920–1993)
6	Josué de Castro (1908–1973)	Brazil	"for his efforts in the pursuit of a world at peace, a world freed from war, and a world freed from hunger."	Lewis Silkin (1889–1972)
6	Josué de Castro (1908–1973)	Brazil	"for his relentness work to eradicate hunger."	R. B. Vieilleville (?)
7	Norman Cousins (1915–1990)	United States	"for his achievements and diplomacy in the effort to promote disarmament and create world peace."	Félix Morlion, O.P. (1904–1987)
7	Norman Cousins (1915–1990)	United States	No motivation included.	Colin Bell (1903–1988)
8	Salvador de Madariaga (1886–1978)	Spain	No motivation included.	Raymond Klibansky (1905–2005)
9	Danilo Dolci (1924–1997)	Italy	No motivation included.	10 members of the Swedish Parliament
10	Arne Geijer (1910–1979)	Sweden	"for his valuable work in the international trade union movement where has contributed to the lessening of world tensions and has facilitated the orderly transformation of many areas from a colonial status to independence, and having made a significant contribution to the peace of the world."	Stanley Knowles (1908–1997)
11	Hermann Gmeiner (1919–1986)	Austria	"as a result of extraordinary humanitarian work, wherein he saw the needs of the children left alone after the second World War, and as the founder of SOS Children's Villages, he has given thousands of orphaned or abandoned children new homes and safety."	Hermann Geißler (1920–2021)
11	Hermann Gmeiner (1919–1986)	Austria	"as the founder of SOS Children's Villages."	Rudolf Hämmerle (1904–1984)
11	Hermann Gmeiner (1919–1986)	Austria	"as the founder of SOS Children's Villages."	Zimmerwald (?)
11	Hermann Gmeiner (1919–1986)	Austria	"as the founder of SOS Children's Villages."	Otto Hofmann-Wellenhof (1909–1988)
11	Hermann Gmeiner (1919–1986)	Austria	"for his founding of SOS Children's Villages where, through his work, he has created a safe and loving place for children, and contributed to a higher level of mutual understanding and peace in the world."	Hans Kulhauch (?)
11	Hermann Gmeiner (1919–1986)	Austria	"for devoting his whole life to give orphaned children new homes and families through his foundation SOS Children's Villages."	Ludwig Weiß (1902–1994)
11	Hermann Gmeiner (1919–1986)	Austria	"for founding SOS Children's Villages and, through his work, gathering millions of people in the cause of good will for abandoned children."	Rhee Hyo-sang (1906–1989)
11	Hermann Gmeiner (1919–1986)	Austria	"for his social work, educational work and efforts in regard of peace, and forming the SOS Children's Villages which has proven to be of exceptional value."	Leopold Helbick (?)
12	Guido Guida (1897–1969)	Italy	"as the founder of the International Radio-Medical Centre (CIRM) and for devoting more than 30 years of his life to the service of suffering humanity."	5 members of the Italian Parliament
13	Mohammad Hejazi (1900–1974)	Iran	"for his eminence as a pacifist writer."	Abbas Aram (1906–1985)
14	Marc Joux (?)	France	"for his writings in a pacifist manner in accordance with Nobelian thinking."	Auguste Billiemaz (1903–1983)
15	Frank Laubach (1884–1970)	United States	"for his efforts to create peace through education, and his practical and basic approach by creating 'Each One Teach One' method."	Augustus Hawkins (1907–2007)
16	Pope Paul VI (1897–1978)	Vatican City	"for his efforts for universal reconciliation, shown in various statements that was given during his visit to Jordan and Israel."	5 professors at the University of Montreal
17	Galo Plaza (1906–1987)	Ecuador	"for his extensive and successful peace-making, and the unusual ability he has demonstrated in this work, wherein he has a career of distinguished national service, and has been willing to undertake arduous, hazardous and extremely vital international assignments in pursuit of peace."	Ralph Bunche (1904–1971)
18	Adlai Stevenson II (1900–1965)	United States	"for his great and lasting contribution to the cause of world peace through his diplomatic skill in the council halls of the United Nations."	Vance Hartke (1919–2003)
19	Clarence Streit (1896–1986)	United States	"for his deep understanding of the principle of federal union, which has enabled free men across a continent to organize themselves together in peace, with freedom and prosperity."	John Leonard Pilcher (1898–1981)
20	U Thant (1909–1974)	Burma	"for his efforts in promoting peace as a representant of his country and later as secretary-general of the U.N."	5 members of the Swedish Parliament
20	U Thant (1909–1974)	Burma	No motivation included.	5 members of the Norwegian Parliament
21	Hans Thirring (1888–1976)	Austria	"for his tireless and pacifistic efforts to prevent nuclear war."	Richard Kerschlagel (?)
22	Abraham Vereide (1886–1969)	United States	"for his work towards the elimination of war from society, and efforts toward world-brotherhood and interracial fraternity through his Christian prayer and action group."	Frank Carlson (1893–1987)
23	Richard von Coudenhove-Kalergi (1894–1972)	Austria; Japan	"for his efforts to create a united, free and peaceful Europe."	Willy Hartner (1905–1981)
24	Shigeru Yoshida (1878–1967)	Japan	"for his efforts to prevent the Pacific War although it was in vain, and his devotion to the restoration of peace."	Eisaku Satō (1901–1975)
24	Shigeru Yoshida (1878–1967)	Japan	No motivations included.	3 nominators from Finland (unnamed)
Organizations
25	International Commission of Jurists (ICJ) (founded in 1952)	Geneva	No motivation included.	Edvard Hambro (1911–1977)
26	Institute of International Law (IDI) (founded in 1873)	Ghent	"for the great service it has given to the cause of peace."	professors at the University of Valencia
26	Institute of International Law (IDI) (founded in 1873)	Ghent	No motivation included.	Anastasios Christofilopoulos (?)
27	The Salvation Army (founded in 1865)	London	"for its remarkable records of promoting the cause of human fellowship through service to others being spiritually motivated in its program of vigorous activism and universal philanthropy."	John Lindsay (1921–2000)
28	United Nations Children's Fund (UNICEF) (founded in 1946)	New York City	"for their work to bring aid to children in difficult situations."	Gudmund Harlem (1917–1988)
28	United Nations Children's Fund (UNICEF) (founded in 1946)	New York City	"for their positive and compassionate work across borders."	Berte Rognerud (1907–1997)
28	United Nations Children's Fund (UNICEF) (founded in 1946)	New York City	"for its constructive activities all over the world, as well as a variety of projects and emergency aids for the benefit of the many countries in need, and for promoting the international solidarity principles leading to world peace and mutual understanding."	4 members of the Yugoslavian Parliament
29	Universal Esperanto Association (UEA) (founded in 1908)	Rotterdam	"for their admirable work for international brotherhood and world peace."	Gilbert Twambe (?)
29	Universal Esperanto Association (UEA) (founded in 1908)	Rotterdam	"for their admirable work for international brotherhood and world peace."	Jole Giugni Lattari (1923–2007)
29	Universal Esperanto Association (UEA) (founded in 1908)	Rotterdam	"for their admirable work for international brotherhood and world peace."	Francesco Franceschini (1908–1987)
29	Universal Esperanto Association (UEA) (founded in 1908)	Rotterdam	"for their admirable work for international brotherhood and world peace."	members of the Swedish Parliament
29	Universal Esperanto Association (UEA) (founded in 1908)	Rotterdam	"for their contribution to the elimination of misunderstanding, mistrust and hatred between peoples, where, through their work, they have created conditions for mutual respect and comprehension as a basis for world peace."	Bautista Lopez Toledo (?)
29	Universal Esperanto Association (UEA) (founded in 1908)	Rotterdam	"for their contribution to the elimination of misunderstanding, mistrust and hatred between peoples, where, through their work, they have created conditions for mutual respect and comprehension as a basis for world peace."	Elías Serra Ráfols (1898–1972)
29	Universal Esperanto Association (UEA) (founded in 1908)	Rotterdam	"for their contribution to the elimination of misunderstanding, mistrust and hatred between peoples, where, through their work, they have created conditions for mutual respect and comprehension as a basis for world peace."	3 members of the Danish Parliament
29	Universal Esperanto Association (UEA) (founded in 1908)	Rotterdam	"for their admirable work for international brotherhood and world peace through the promotion of the international language Esperanto."	Daniel Jones (1881–1967)
29	Universal Esperanto Association (UEA) (founded in 1908)	Rotterdam	"for their efforts to establish an understanding among nations which would lay the foundations for world peace."	Clifford Kenyon (1896–1979)
29	Universal Esperanto Association (UEA) (founded in 1908)	Rotterdam	"for their admirable efforts to create mutual understanding, cooperation, and peace in the world."	5 members of the Norwegian Parliament
29	Universal Esperanto Association (UEA) (founded in 1908)	Rotterdam	"for succeeding in developing admirable activity in favor of international understanding and world peace."	Adam Schaff (1913–2006)
29	Universal Esperanto Association (UEA) (founded in 1908)	Rotterdam	"for creating relations between all men, resulting in a feeling of solidarity, understanding and esteem."	professors at the University of Zaragoza
29	Universal Esperanto Association (UEA) (founded in 1908)	Rotterdam	"for their admirable efforts towards the creation of international understanding between peoples and world peace."	Oscar Secco Ellauri (1904–1990)
29	Universal Esperanto Association (UEA) (founded in 1908)	Rotterdam	No motivation included.	Bernard Cochoy (?)
29	Universal Esperanto Association (UEA) (founded in 1908)	Rotterdam	No motivation included.	Guy Mollet (1905–1975)
29	Universal Esperanto Association (UEA) (founded in 1908)	Rotterdam	No motivation included.	Vladislav Brajković (1905–1989)
29	Universal Esperanto Association (UEA) (founded in 1908)	Rotterdam	No motivation included.	Philippe Rivay (?)
29	Universal Esperanto Association (UEA) (founded in 1908)	Rotterdam	No motivation included.	Pierre Garet (1905–1972)
29	Universal Esperanto Association (UEA) (founded in 1908)	Rotterdam	No motivation included.	Marcel Molle (1902–1995)
29	Universal Esperanto Association (UEA) (founded in 1908)	Rotterdam	No motivation included.	José Maria Hernández-Rubio (1912–1991)
29	Universal Esperanto Association (UEA) (founded in 1908)	Rotterdam	No motivation included.	Walter Simoens (1914–1978)
29	Universal Esperanto Association (UEA) (founded in 1908)	Rotterdam	No motivation included.	Frank Van Acker (1929–1992)
29	Universal Esperanto Association (UEA) (founded in 1908)	Rotterdam	No motivation included.	Aase Bjerkholt (1915–2012)
29	Universal Esperanto Association (UEA) (founded in 1908)	Rotterdam	No motivation included.	J. R. A. Mayer (?)
29	Universal Esperanto Association (UEA) (founded in 1908)	Rotterdam	No motivation included.	members of the Italian Senate
29	Universal Esperanto Association (UEA) (founded in 1908)	Rotterdam	No motivation included.	members of the Italian Chamber of Deputies
29	Universal Esperanto Association (UEA) (founded in 1908)	Rotterdam	No motivation included.	members of the Bulgarian Parliament
29	Universal Esperanto Association (UEA) (founded in 1908)	Rotterdam	No motivation included.	Živan Milisavac (1915–1997)
29	Universal Esperanto Association (UEA) (founded in 1908)	Rotterdam	No motivation included.	D. A. Thanopoulos (?)
29	Universal Esperanto Association (UEA) (founded in 1908)	Rotterdam	No motivation included.	Vasil Tchotchov (?)
29	Universal Esperanto Association (UEA) (founded in 1908)	Rotterdam	No motivation included.	members of the Dutch Parliament
30	Women's International League for Peace and Freedom (WILPF) (founded in 1915)	Geneva	No motivation included.	Marie Lous Mohr (1892–1973)
31	World Veterans Federation (WVF) (founded in 1876)	Geneva	"for their devotion to the search for peace and their efforts towards disarmament."	Vittorio Badini Confalonieri (1914–1993)

== Norwegian Nobel Committee ==
The following members of the Norwegian Nobel Committee appointed by the Storting were responsible for the selection of the 1965 Nobel laureate in accordance with the will of Alfred Nobel:

1965 Norwegian Nobel Committee
Picture	Name	Position	Political Party	Other posts
	Gunnar Jahn (1883–1971)	Chairman	Liberal	former Governor, Norges Bank (1946–1954) former, Minister of Finance (1934–35, 1945)
	Gustav Natvig-Pedersen (Note: When Natvig-Pedersen died in May 1965, he was replaced by deputy member Helge Refsum.) (1893–1965)	Member	Labour	former President of the Storting (1949–1954)
	Helge Refsum (1897–1976)	Member	Centre	former Judge at the Gulating Court (1922–1949)
	Aase Lionæs (1907–1999)	Member	Labour	Vice President of the Lagting (1965–1973)
	Nils Langhelle (1907–1967)	Member	Labour	former Minister of Defence (1952–1954); President of the Storting (1958–1965)
	John Lyng (Note: Erling Wikborg served as a deputy for Lyng when the latter became Foreign Minister in 1965.) (1905–1978)	Member (on leave)	Conservative	24th Prime Minister of Norway (1963)
	Erling Wikborg (1894–1992)	Member	Christian People	former Leader of the Christian Democratic Party (1951–1955)
