= Alcindo Guanabara =

Brazilian journalist and politician

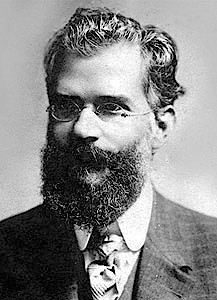

Federal Deputy from the Federal District
- In office 22 May 1906 – 3 May 1909

Personal details
- Born: 19 July 1865 Magé, Rio de Janeiro, Empire of Brazil
- Died: 20 August 1918 (aged 53) Rio de Janeiro, Brazil
- Party: PRF

Alcindo Guanabara (19 July 1865 – 20 August 1918) was a Brazilian journalist and politician.
