= Elisa Orth =

Brazilian chemist

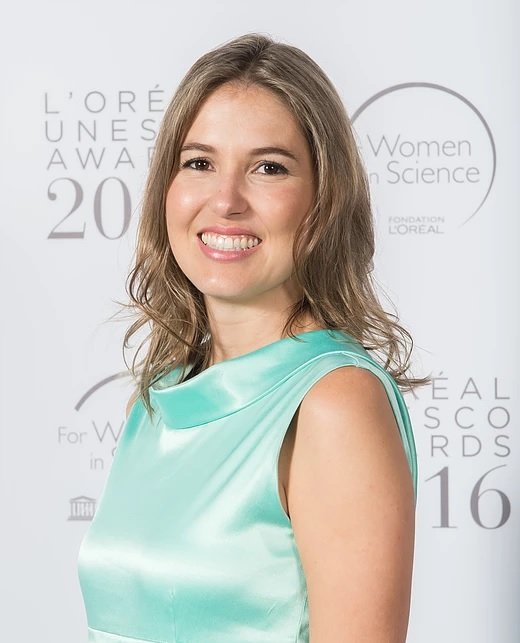
- Born: 1984 (age 41–42)
- Education: Federal University of Santa Catarina
- Occupation: Researcher
- Employer: Federal University of Paraná
- Known for: Research of artificial enzymes

Elisa Orth (born c. 1984) is a Brazilian chemist and professor of the Department of Chemistry of the Federal University of Paraná in Brazil. She came to notice in 2015 when she won an award from L'Oreal and UNESCO for her work on artificial enzymes.

== Life ==
Orth was born in about 1984. Her parents were both scientists and as a girl she looked to the work of Jane Goodall for inspiration. She went on to take graduate, masters and a doctorate in Chemistry at the Federal University of Santa Catarina.

She and her research team at the Federal University of Paraná in Brazil (2015) are looking at minimising the damage caused by pesticides. They are looking at nanocatalysts which they believe can act as artificial enzymes to remove the effects of pesticides in food. Her work leads to the development of nano-catalysts for multi-purpose sensors. The same enzyme technology may also be applied to remove the effects of diseases such as cancer, fibrosis, Parkinson's disease and Alzheimer's disease.

In 2015 she was part of the Post-Graduate Program in Chemistry, Catalysis and Kinetic Laboratory when she was given an award - Women in Science, created by UNESCO and the L'Oréal Foundation. The award was given in Paris and she was chosen from hundreds of competitors to receive the prize of 20,000 euros for her Technology and engineering contribution. Orth reports that she has suffered from discrimination in academia due to her gender but she believes that her success can be a role model to girls to follow her career.

She was recognized with the Women in Chemistry and Related Sciences award, sponsored by CAS, a division of ACS, and Chemical & Engineering News. Elisa Orth has a total of 25 awards and titles in her curriculum.
