= Marcia Theophilo =

Brazilian poet

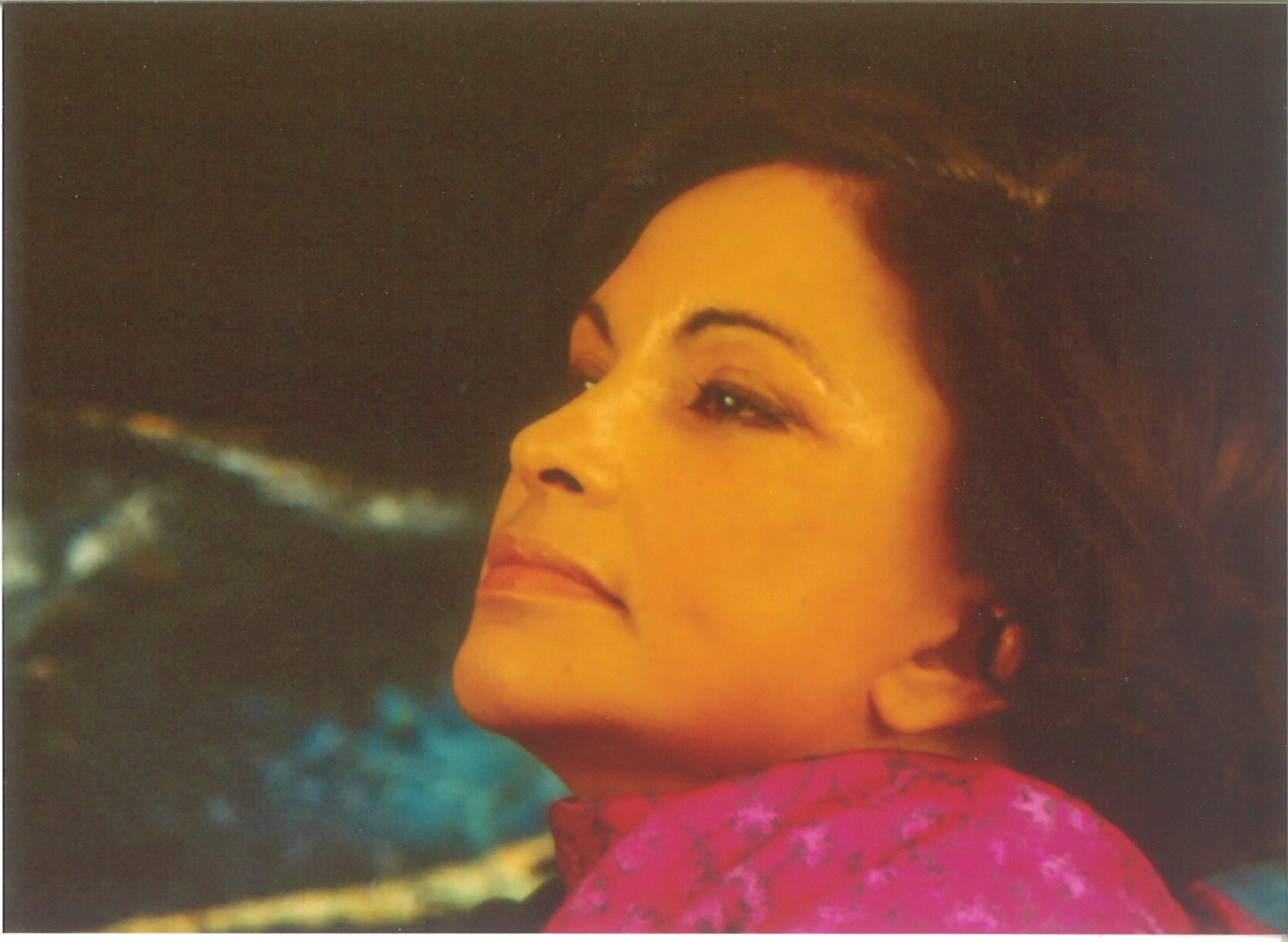
- Marcia Theophilo
- Born: 1941 (age 84–85); Fortaleza, Brazil
- Writing career
- Language: Portuguese, Italian and English
- Subject: Amazon rainforest
- Website: Official website

Marcia Theophilo (born 1941 in Fortaleza) is a Brazilian poet. She studied in Rio de Janeiro, São Paulo and Rome, where she graduated in anthropology. She has lived and worked in Rome since 1971. She is a bilingual poet; her books can be found in Portuguese, Italian and English.

Marcia Theophilo has published short stories, essays, and eleven books of poetry. These books include I bambini giaguaro/Os meninos jaguar, which won the Fregene Prize, Kupahuba Albero dello Spirito Santo, and Amazonia Respiro Del Mondo. The Amazon rainforest is the topic of Marcia's life and work: its river, people, myths, the animal and plant life, and the effort and persistence to save The Amazon's natural and cultural heritage.
