= Sérgio Trindade =

Brazilian chemical engineer and researcher (1940–2020)

- Born: 14 December 1940; Rio de Janeiro, Brazil
- Died: 18 March 2020 (aged 79); New York City, New York, U.S.
- Education: Massachusetts Institute of Technology, Federal University of Rio de Janeiro
- Awards: IPCC received Nobel Peace Prize, 2007
- Scientific career
- Fields: Chemical engineer
- Workplaces: United Nations Centre for Science and Technology, Intergovernmental Panel on Climate Change (IPCC), SE2T International

External videos
- "Dr. Sergio C. Trindade, Former Assistant, Secretary General, United Nations for WSDF 2020", 6 February 2020, POP Movement
- "UN Web TV - World Chronicle 253: Sergio Trindade, Centre for Science and Technology for Development", 31 December 1969

Sérgio Campos Trindade (14 December 1940 — 18 March 2020) was a Brazilian chemical engineer and researcher, specialist in renewable energies and consultant in sustainable business. Trindade was the coordinating lead author for a chapter of an Intergovernmental Panel on Climate Change (IPCC) report, Methodological and Technical Issues in Technology Transfer (2000); the IPCC as an organization won the 2007 Nobel Peace Prize as a result of its contributors' work. Sérgio died on March 18, 2020, in New York City, New York of complications from COVID-19. He was 79 years old.

In 1986, Trindade was appointed as the Executive Director of the United Nations Centre for Science and Technology for Development, a position he retained until January 1991. He was a member of the Scientific Committee for Environmental Problems, an agency associated with UN for Education, Science and Culture (Unesco).

== Early life and education ==
Trindade was born in Rio de Janeiro, where he graduated in chemistry at the Federal University. In 1973, he obtained his doctorate (published as S.C. Trinidade) at the Massachusetts Institute of Technology with a doctoral thesis on the subject of "Studies on the magnetic demineralization of coal".

== Research ==
Trindade has studied biofuels and their sustainability extensively. Trindade worked with the Centro de Technologia Promon in Rio de Janeiro, Brazil on the Brazilian Gasohol Program, which began in 1975. He examined the economics of producing alcohol for biofuels from cassava as well as from sugarcane and predicted that agricultural and distillery yield increases would be highly sensitive to alcohol economics. This program was seen as a "valuable indication of the potential of alcohol fuels".

Trindade helped to organize the United Nations Conference on Environment and Development (Rio-92), and to elaborate Agenda 21, the United Nations' globally applicable action plan for sustainable development.

As part of Working Group III of the Intergovernmental Panel on Climate Change (IPCC), he has written about the decision-making processes and the management of technological change to address climate change. He acted as coordinating lead author for Chapter 1 of the IPCC's Special Report on Climate Change, Methodological and Technological Issues In Technology Transfer (2000). He was a contributing author to Renewable Energy Sources and Climate Change Mitigation: Special Report of the Intergovernmental Panel on Climate Change (2011).

Trindade served as director of science and technology for the St. Louis-based company International Fuel Technology, developing blended fuels. Trindade has argued that nanotechnology can be used to develop specialized additives and biofuel/fuel blends, as part of a transition from oil to alternative forms of energy.

In 2006, as president of the consultancy firm SE2T International, Trindade led a Mexican government study into the use of biofuels. He recommended that Mexico transition away from buying expensive imported MTBE (a fossil fuel additive) and towards domestic production of ethanol-based fuels. The Mexican Congress subsequently passed a bill promoting the production and use of ethanol from sugarcane. The bill met with opposition from the state oil monopoly Petróleos Mexicanos (Pemex) and had not been signed into law as of May 2007.

In speaking about Brazilian ethanol made from sugarcane, he said:

When evaluating a fuel from an ecological point of view, it is necessary to analyze the entire chain of its production. The sugarcane ethanol produced in Brazil is the cleanest fuel ecologically, even taking into account that sugarcane harvesting is done in Brazil with the help of controlled burning of the fields, in order to facilitate the cutting of the cane. (Quando se avalia um combustível do ponto de vista ecológico, é preciso analisar toda a cadeia produtiva. O etanol de cana-de-açúcar produzido no Brasil é o combustível mais limpo ecologicamente, mesmo levando em conta que a colheita da cana é feita no Brasil com ajuda de queimadas controladas no terreno plantado, a fim de facilitar o corte.)

Trindade has emphasized the importance of engaging with stakeholders and developing long-term sustainable solutions, not just relying on technocratic or short-term solutions. Trindade was a lead researcher and contributor to the Worldwatch Institute's report on Biofuels for Transport: Global Potential and Implications for Sustainable Energy and Agriculture (2012). He is a co-editor of Global Bioethanol: Evolution, Risks and Uncertainties (2016), for which he wrote a chapter of use of biofuels in Africa.

== Death ==
Trindade chaired his last session on sustainability and innovation at the second World Sustainable Development Forum in Durango, Mexico, in early March 2020. He died from complications of COVID-19 in New York City, where he had lived for thirty years, on 18 March 2020, aged 79, during the COVID-19 pandemic in the United States. He is survived by his wife, Helena Trindade.

== Selected publications ==
- Worldwatch Institute (2012). Biofuels for Transport: Global Potential and Implications for Sustainable Energy and Agriculture. Earthscan. ISBN 9781849770590.
- Trindade, Sergio C. (2000). "Managing Technological Change in Support of the Climate Change Convention: Framework for Decision-Making". In Metz, Bert; Davidson, Ogunlade; Martens, Jan-Willem; Rooijen, Sascha Van; Mcgrory, Laura Van Wie (eds.). Methodological and Technological Issues In Technology Transfer. Cambridge University Press. pp. 47–67. ISBN 9780521804943.
- Edenhofer, Ottmar; Pichs-Madruga, Ramón; Sokona, Youba; Seyboth, Kristin; Kadner, Susanne; Zwickel, Timm; Eickemeier, Patrick; Hansen, Gerrit; Schlömer, Steffen; Stechow, Christoph von; Matschoss, Patrick (21 November 2011). Renewable Energy Sources and Climate Change Mitigation: Special Report of the Intergovernmental Panel on Climate Change. Cambridge University Press. ISBN 9781139505598.
