= Maggie Gobran =

Egyptian Coptic nun

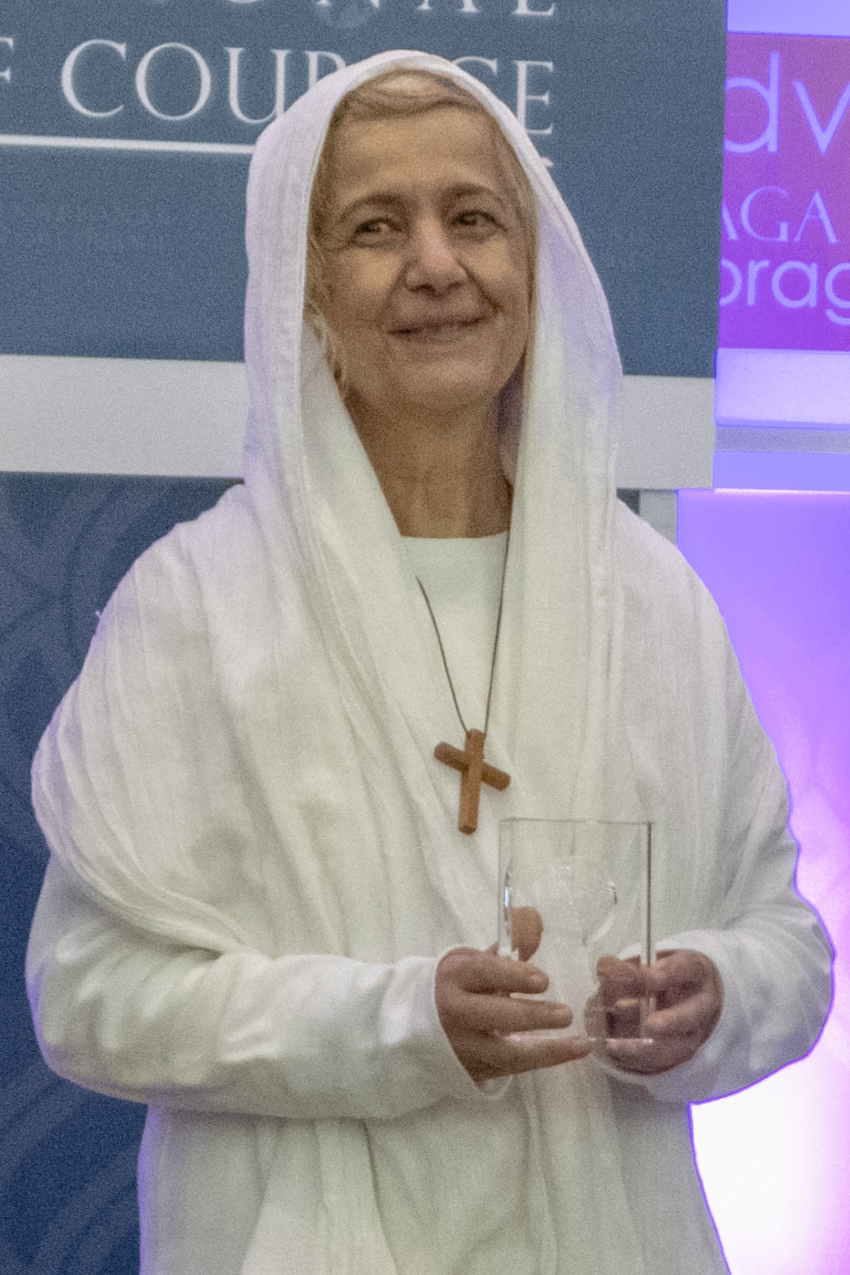
Maggie Gobran in 2019

Maggie Gobran (Arabic: ماجي جبران) or Mama Maggie is a Coptic Orthodox consecrated servant and the founder and CEO of the non-profit charity Stephen's Children in Cairo, Egypt. She was also professor of computer science at the American University in Cairo, is married and has a son and a daughter. She was nominated for Nobel Peace Prize in 2012 and 2020.

== Life ==
Maggie Gobran often referred to as the Mother Teresa of Cairo, is a Coptic Christian lady who once lived an affluent lifestyle, sheltered from poverty and misery. Despite this, she still experienced persecution as a Christian in Egypt. In 1989, she gave up her academic career to become a Coptic Orthodox Christian consecrated servant and set up the charity Stephen's Children, whose aim is improving the lives of the children of Christians and families living in Cairo's slum quarters and impoverished communities in rural Upper Egypt. She also offers help to impoverished Muslim and Bahá'í children.

In 2019, she was awarded the International Women of Courage Award by the Department of United States and the US First Lady Melania Trump. Gobran was on the list of the BBC's 100 Women announced on 23 November 2020.

== Resources ==
Her own words (English)

- Mama Maggie Gobran teaching about the power of silence as a spiritual discipline

Story (documentary in English)

- Mama Maggie part 01
- Mama Maggie part 02
