= Ana Montenegro =

Brazilian writer

- Born: Ana Lima Vaughness; 13 April 1915; Quixeramobim, Ceará, Brazil
- Died: 30 March 2006 (aged 90); Salvador de Bahia, Brazil
- Occupations: poet, writer, feminist
- Years active: 1944-1998

Ana Montenegro (April 13, 1915 – March 30, 2006) was a Brazilian author, journalist, activist, editor, and poet. She was a militant communist and lived in exile for more than 15 years after the 1964 coup. She was a lawyer who advised on human rights and women's rights issues and actively fought against racism. She wrote extensively on women's issues, from their health to their socio-economic rights; the legal-cultural struggle of blacks against racism; and the struggles of urban and rural workers to gain their rights under the Constitution. After returning from exile, she was honored by her local bar association, her state, and the nation of Brazil for her human rights work. In 2005, she was one of the 1000 women nominated for the Nobel Peace Prize.

== Biography ==
Ana Lima Vaughness was born 13 April 1915 in Quixeramobim, Ceará, Brazil to Paul Elpídio Vaughnesse and Lila Vaughnesse Correia Lima. A communist militant from a young age, she moved to Rio de Janeiro for her university studies and majored in Law and Literature at the Federal University of Rio de Janeiro.

During this period, she married Alberto Carmo, adopted the name Ana Lima Carmo, and had two children, Sonia and Miguel. She participated in several leftist movements around the country in 1945, and joined the Partido Comunista Brasileiro (PCB) (Brazilian Communist Party) in July of that year. She began working for communist publications and mainstream newspapers, publishing hundreds of articles in such papers as Classe Operária, Tribuna Popular, Correio da Manhã, Imprensa Popular, Novos Rumos about party ideology, from 1944 onward.

Between 1945 and 1947, she worked at the newspapers O Momento and Seiva, both published in Salvador de Bahia, Brazil, where she had moved. She was active in the Women's Movement and in 1945, founded the Democratic Union of Women of Bahia, where she served until 1964 when she went into exile. She attended meetings of the PCB's women's organization called the Foundation of the Federation of Women of Brazil; the Women's League of the State of Guanabara, created in 1959; and the Committee for Female Pro-Democracy. Montenegro, at this time called Carmo, actively participated in the Women's Exchange and Friendship Commission and the League of National Defense Against Fascism. She was active in the creation of the journal MomentoFeminino and she edited it from 1947 for around a decade. The magazine was later censored and banned.

From 1959 to 1963, she was a chronicler for the magazine Problemas e Estudos Sociais and was a broadcaster on Rádio Mayrink Veiga. When the 1964 Brazilian coup d'état occurred, Carmo became the first woman to be exiled. She went into exile in 1964, initially moving to Mexico. From Mexico, she went to Cuba and met Fidel Castro along with other members of his revolutionary allies. After leaving Cuba, she moved to Europe and settled in East Germany, where she spent most of her years of exile.

From East Germany, she became a member of the Latin American section of the Women's International Democratic Federation, taking over as editor of their Journal de Mulheres do Mundo inteiro (Worldwide Women's Magazine), published in Arabic, English, French, German, Russian and Spanish. Because of her exile, Carmo signed her articles with the pseudonym Ana Montenegro, and then adopted the name. She also began to work with the United Nations and UNESCO on women's and human rights issues, participating in several international conferences.

She did not return to Brazil until amnesty was granted in 1979 and the country began heading towards re-democratization. She went to live in Salvador de Bahia again and actively returned to feminism. Montenegro was invited to participate in the National Council of Women's Rights management from 1985 to 1989. She also served as adviser to the Order of Attorneys of Brazil on human rights issues in Bahia and for the Women's Forum of Salvador. During this period, she intensified her fight for human rights for women and against racism. She wrote extensively on women's health issues, their socio-economic rights, legal-cultural struggle of blacks against racism, and the struggles of urban and rural workers to gain their rights under the Constitution.

Beginning in the 1980s, Montenegro published several books, including Tempo de Exílio, Uma história de lutas, Ser ou não ser feminista and Mulheres - Participação nas lutas populares, as well as many journalism pieces and poems. She also worked with the compilers of Carlos Marighela: O homem por trás do mito, who collected poems, essays and memoirs of Marighela's life from those who knew him and she wrote about his death in Tempo de Exílio.

She was honored in a national congress of the Brazilian Bar Association and received several honors from national institutions. In 2005, she was one of the 1000 women nominated for the Nobel Peace Prize.

Montenegro died 30 March 2006 in Salvador de Bahia. In 2011, she posthumously received the Chico Mendes Medal of Resistance awarded by the human rights group Tortura Nunca Mais.

== Awards ==
- Medal Tomé de Sousa, 1995
- National Human Rights Award, 2002
- Nobel Peace Prize nominee, 2005

== Selected works ==
- Ser ou não ser feminista Guararapes: Recife, Brazil (1981) (in Portuguese)
- Mulheres, participação nas lutas populares M & S Gráfica e Editora: Salvador de Bahia, Brazil (1985) (in Portuguese)
- Tempo de exílio Edições Novos Rumos: Aracaju, Brazil (1988) (in Portuguese)
- Memória popular--a participação das mulheres nas lutas populares em Salvador Câmara Municipal de Salvador: Salvador de Bahia, Brazil (199?) (in Portuguese)
- Poèmes philosophiques (1999) (in Portuguese)
- Carlos Ghosn : del milagro de Nissan al relanzamiento de Renault (2000) (in Portuguese)

== Bibliography ==
- Vieceli, Alberto (2005). 1000 Peacewomen Across the Globe. Scalo. ISBN 978-3-03939-039-7.
