= Hilário de Gouvêa =

Brazilian ophthalmologist

Dr. Hilário Soares de Gouvêa
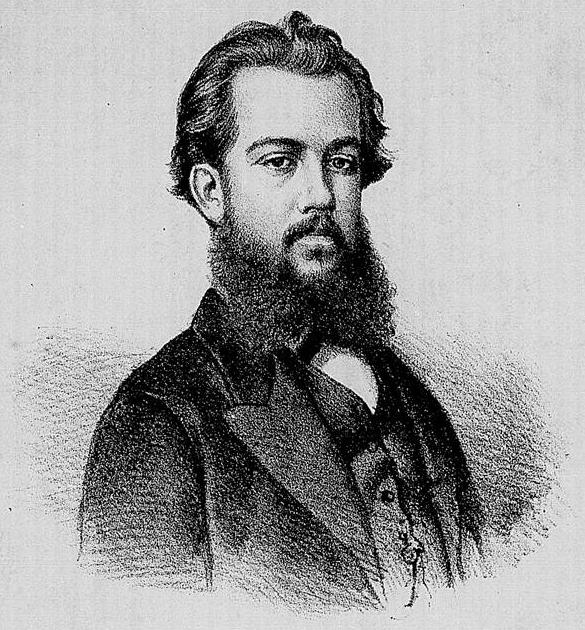
- Hilário de Gouvêa in 1869
- Born: 1843; Brazil
- Died: 1929 (aged 85–86)
- Known for: first documentation of hereditary cancer
- Scientific career
- Fields: Ophthalmology, Oncology

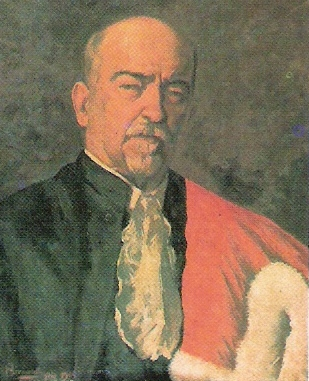
Hilário de Gouvêia

Hilário de Gouvêa (1843–1929) was a Brazilian ophthalmologist noted for being the first person to document a case of hereditary cancer. The cause of the recessive familial retinoblastoma he described was later further investigated and resulted in the first reported example of a tumor suppressor gene, RB.
