= Gerardo Melo Mourão =

Brazilian writer and politician

Gerardo Majella Mello Mourão (January 8, 1917 – March 9, 2007) was a Brazilian poet, fictionist, politician, journalist, translator, essayist and biographer, considered a key figure in both national and all Lusophone literature. Mourão joined the Brazilian Integralist Action in the late 1930s. In 1942, he was convicted of spying for Nazi Germany and sentenced to life imprisonment, later reduced to 30 years. He was released from prison in 1948.

Mello Mourão was widely awarded, competing for the Nobel Prize in Literature by nomination from The State University of New York.

His most famous works are Invention of the Sea, with which he won the Jabuti Prize, and the trilogy Os Peãs. On this trilogy, Ezra Pound commented:

"In all my work, what I tried to do was write the epic of America. I don't think I could. Who achieved it was the poet of The Country of the Moors".

Mourão was praised and recognized by the likes of Jorge Luis Borges, Antonio Houaiss, Nélida Piñon, Alfredo Bosi, Dora Ferreira da Silva, Wilson Martins and Antônio Cândido.

Carlos Drummond de Andrade defined him as "the great poet of Brazil". His private life was marked by numerous arrests, given his involvement with the ideological movements of the twentieth century. A member of the Integralist Movement, he later became a willing German intelligence agent in Brazil. During the dictatorship of Getúlio Vargas, Mello Mourão was arrested 18 times. Already in the period of the Brazilian military dictatorship, he was taken to the inquiry and tortured, this time on charges of contributing to Communists.

== Works ==
In Portuguese.

- Poesia do homem só (Rio de Janeiro: Ariel Editora, 1938)
- Mustafá Kemel (1938)
- Do Destino do Espírito (1941)
- Argentina (1942)
- Cabo das Tormentas (Edic̜ões do Atril, 1950)
- Três Pavanas (São Paulo: GRD, 1961)
- O País dos Mourões (São Paulo: GRD, 1963)
- Dossiê da destruição (São Paulo: GRD, 1966)
- Frei e Chile num continente ocupado (Rio de Janeiro: Tempo Brasileiro, 1966)
- Peripécia de Gerardo (São Paulo: Paz e Terra, 1972) [Prêmio Mário de Andrade de 1972]
- Astro de Apolo (São Paulo: GRD, 1977)
- O Canto de Amor e Morte do Porta-estandarte Cristóvão Rilke [tradução] (1977)
- Pierro della Francesca ou as Vizinhas Chilenas: Contos (São Paulo: GRD, 1979)
- Os Peãs (Rio de Janeiro: Record, 1982)
- A invenção do saber (São Paulo: Paz e Terra, 1983)
- Valete de Espadas (Rio de Janeiro: Guanabara, 1986)
- O Poema, de Parmênides [tradução] (in Caderno Lilás, Secretaria de Cultura da Prefeitura do Rio de Janeiro: Caderno Rio-Arte. Ano 2, nr. 5, 1986)
- Suzana-3 - Elegia e inventário (São Paulo: GRD, 1994)
- Invenção do Mar: Carmen sæculare (Rio de Janeiro: Record, 1997), Prêmio Jabuti 1999
- Cânon & fuga (Rio de Janeiro: Record, 1999)
- Um Senador de Pernambuco: Breve Memória de Antônio de Barros Carvalho (Rio de Janeiro: Topbooks, 1999)
- O Bêbado de Deus (São Paulo: Green Forest do Brasil, 2000)
- Os Olhos do Gato & O Retoque Inacabado (2002)
- O sagrado e o profano (Florianópolis: Museu/Arquivo da Poesia Manuscrita, 2002)
- Algumas Partituras (Rio de Janeiro: Topbooks, 2002)
- O Nome de Deus [posthumous] (in: Confraria 2 anos, 2007)
