= Photofluorography =

- Specialty: Radiology
- MeSH: D010779

Photofluorography (sometimes called just fluorography) is photography of X-ray images from a fluorescent screen. It is commonly used in some countries for chest X-ray screening, e.g. to diagnose tuberculosis (see Abreugraphy for more information on such usage of this technique).

== Method of image formation in photofluorography ==
X-ray beams from the tube get attenuated by the patient producing a transmitted radiation intensity corresponding to the part of the body traversed by the X-ray beam. Transmitted intensities now fall on the photocathode stimulating it to produce electrons in quantities external to the light intensities emitted by the input. This is caused by the formation of a light image of the transmitted radiation pattern. Electrons from the photocathode are accelerated and focused electronically out on the output phosphor which emits light as a result of electron bombardment. This shows a magnified image of what appears on the input phosphor. The semitransparent mirror splits the image in which one part is focused by the camera lens onto the film to form the image. The image size depends on the focal length of the camera lens. At the same time, the TV camera lens focuses the light to form an image on the TV camera photoreceptor where the image is transformed to a complex electronic signal and sent to the electronic image distributor. This then passes the image to the various display or recording devices, e.g. a videotape recorder, kinescope, TV, or display.

== See also ==
- Chest photofluorography
