= Josué de Castro =

Brazilian physician (1908–1973)

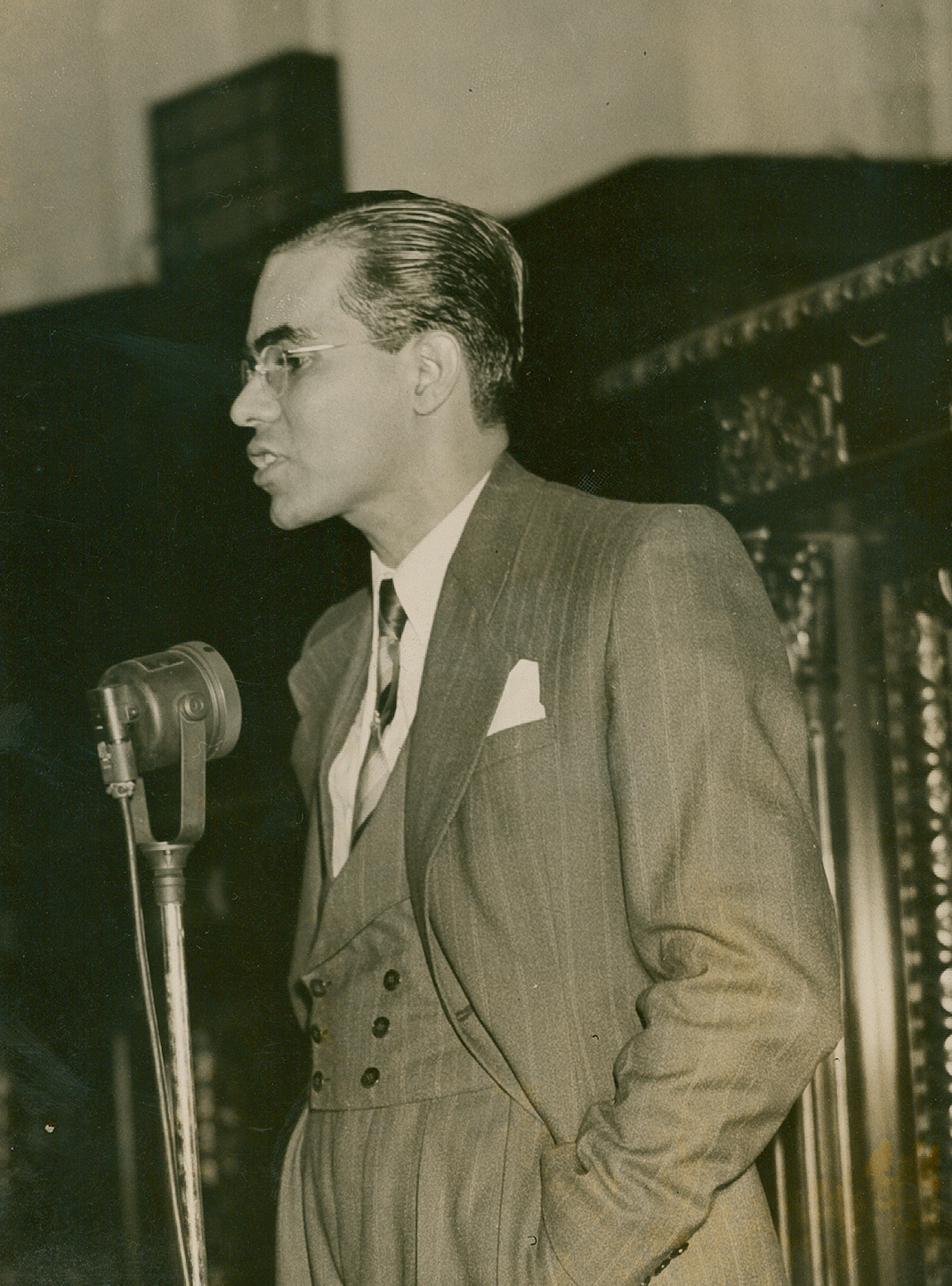
- Castro in 1940
- Born: Josué Apolônio de Castro; 5 September 1908; Recife, Brazil
- Died: 24 September 1973 (aged 65); Paris, France
- Occupations: Writer, physician, geographer, public administrator, diplomat, activist

Josué de Castro, born Josué Apolônio de Castro (5 September 1908 – 24 September 1973), was a Brazilian physician, nutritionist, geographer, writer, public administrator, and activist against world hunger.

His book Geopolitics of Hunger was granted The Franklin D. Roosevelt Foundation Award in 1952 and the 1954 International Peace Prize. He was chairman of the United Nations' Food and Agriculture Organization (FAO). His disappointing experiences at FAO pushed him to become involved in the movement for world government, seeing it as the only viable solution to world hunger.

== Biography ==
Castro was born in Recife. He taught at the University of Brazil (today's UFRJ) and was chairman of the United Nations' Food and Agriculture Organization (FAO). He was also a member of the Brazilian parliament and a diplomat. His political rights came to an end with the military coup of 1964, when he moved to France. For many years he was president of the Association Médicale Internationale pour l’Etude des Conditions de Vie et de Santé (The International Medical Association for the Study of the Conditions of Life and Health) and member of other international organizations. He taught at Paris 8 University until his death in Paris.

== Main works ==
=== The Geography of Hunger ===
Ground-breaking ecological work about the political issue of hunger in Brazil. Published in 1946, the book emphasizes the socio-economic backgrounds of the biological manifestation of hunger and condemns the physical determinism.

=== The Geopolitics of Hunger ===
Originally published in the U.S. with the title "The Geography of Hunger" in 1952, translated into 26 languages, is one of the classic works on food and population. His themes are very much the opposite of those sounded by the neo-Malthusians. He does not believe that hunger is the "natural result of overpopulation," but is rather a man-made phenomenon. Even more, he undertakes to demonstrate that hunger, rather than being the result of overpopulation, is the cause of it. The work presented new formulations for underdevelopment, and was granted with The Franklin D. Roosevelt Foundation Award.

=== Death in the Northeast ===
A book that aims to strike the interest for the Northeast Brazilian people's situation. Written before military coup of 1964, and published during the military dictatorship, it clarifies the political turmoil and explosive tensions around the Brazilian agrarian system, established by feudalist Portuguese colonizers.

=== Of Men and Crabs ===
Exiled at Paris, he wrote about the scene of his childhood.

== Global policy ==
He was one of the signatories of the agreement to convene a convention for drafting a world constitution. As a result, for the first time in human history, a World Constituent Assembly convened to draft and adopt the Constitution for the Federation of Earth.
