= Linton Lomas Barrett =

American educator, editor and diplomat (1904–1972)

Linton Lomas Barrett, Ph.D. (1 September 1904 – 8 March 1972) was an influential educator, administrator, diplomat, editor, Hispanist and translator of Romance languages.

== Life ==
Barrett was born in Lanett, Alabama, the son of Linton Stephens Barrett, a Baptist minister and educator, and Carrie Elizabeth Barrett, née Lomas. He was known as "Lomas" to distinguish him from his father. He graduated from Mercer University, A.B. (magna cum laude), in 1928.

Barrett married Elizabeth Elliott in 1929. She died in 1932 very soon after the birth of their only son, Arthur Lomas Barrett. His second wife was Cornelia, from whom he was soon divorced. He married Marie Hamilton McDavid on 26 May 1937, and their daughter, Ellen Marie Barrett, was born in 1946.

Barrett earned his Ph.D. from University of North Carolina at Chapel Hill in 1938.

Barrett was an instructor at Princeton University, the University of Kansas, and colleges across the southeastern United States before joining Washington and Lee University as a professor of Romance languages in 1948. He was department head throughout the 1960s and part of the faculty until the year of his death. During the 1950s he also served as a public affairs officer at U.S. embassies in Colombia and Ecuador.

Barrett edited the textbook, still in current use, Five Centuries of Spanish Literature: From The Cid through the Golden Age, and served as associate editor of Hispania. He translated numerous works, including Erico Verissimo's O Tempo e o Vento (Time and the Wind) and Alves Redol's A Man with Seven Names.

He was a member of the Modern Language Association of America, the American Association of Teachers of Spanish and Portuguese, and Phi Beta Kappa.

Barrett is buried in Lexington, Virginia.

== Publications ==
=== Author ===
- (Editor with R. W. Linker) A Mediaeval Italian Anthology, privately published, 1938.
- Five Centuries of Spanish Literature, Dodd, 1962.
- Barron's Simplified Approach to Cervantes: Don Quixote, Barron's Educational Series (Woodbury, NY), 1971.
- A Comparative Study of Six Manuscripts of Juan Perez de Montalban's Como padre y como rey, edited by Carmen Iranzo de Ebersole, introduction by Sturgis E. Leavitt, Estudios de Hispanofila (Chapel Hill, NC), 1976.

=== Translator ===
- Erico Verissimo, Time and the Wind, Macmillan, 1951.
- Verissimo, Night, Macmillan, 1956.
- Manuel A. de Almeida, Memoirs of a Militia Sergeant, Pan American Union, 1959.
- Verissimo, Mexico, Orion, 1960.
- Vianna Moog, Bandeirantes and Pioneers, Braziller, 1963.
- Alves Redol, A Man with Seven Names, Knopf, 1965.
- Verissimo, His Excellency, the Ambassador, Macmillan, 1966.

Dr. Barrett was associate editor of Hispania from 1950 to 1964. He had articles published in numerous Spanish-American newspapers and in professional journals in several countries.
