= O Tempo e o Vento =

Trilogy of historical novels by Erico Verissimo

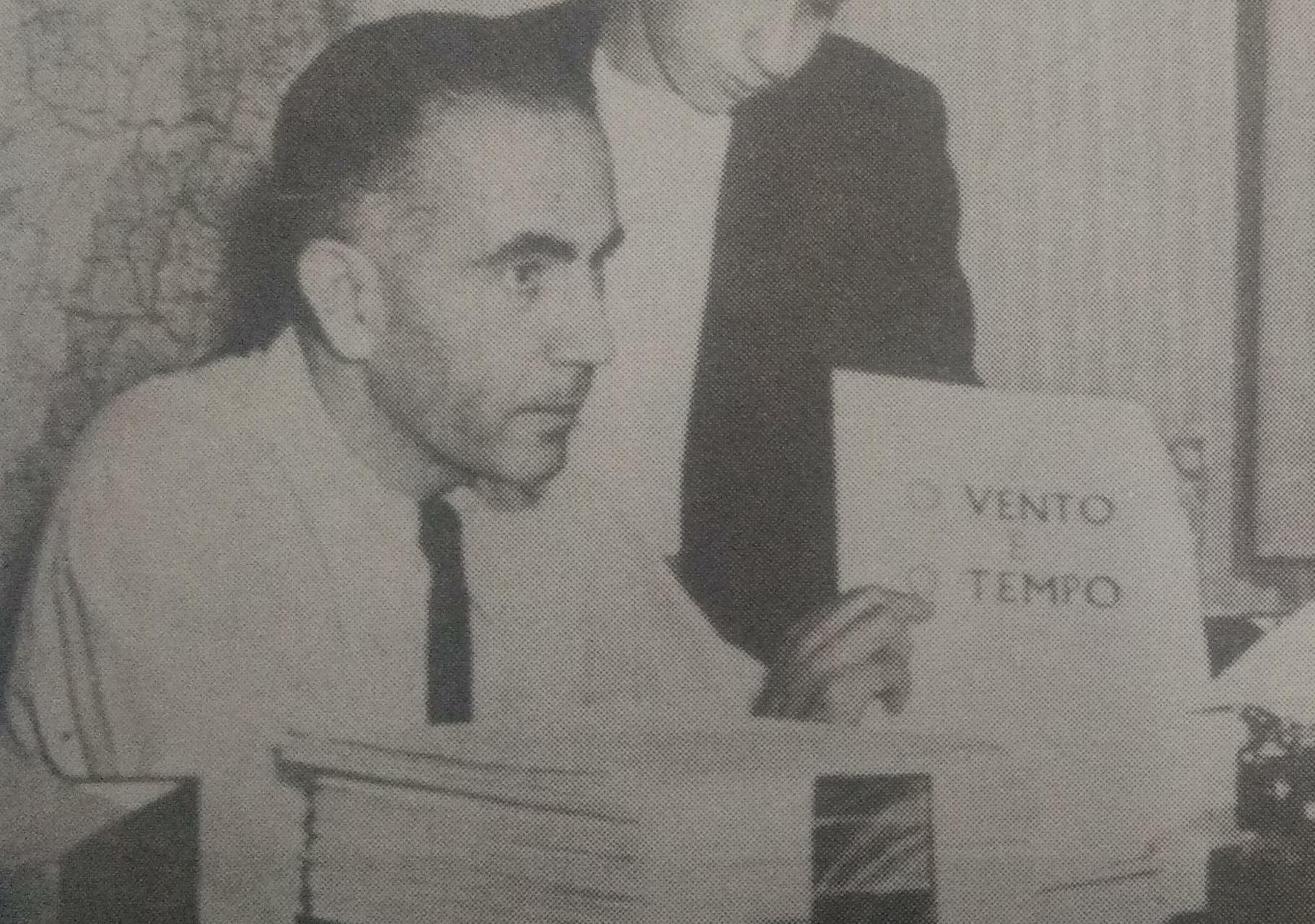
- Erico Verissimo, date unknown. The original title was O Vento e o Tempo, reversed before publication.
- O Continente (1949) — vols. 1–2; O Retrato (1951) — vols. 1–2; O Arquipélago (1961–1962) — vols. 1–3
- Author: Erico Verissimo
- Country: Brazil
- Language: Portuguese
- Genre: Historical fiction Family saga
- Publisher: (Brazil) Editora Globo (1949–2004); Companhia das Letras (2004–present)
- Published: 1949–1962
- No. of books: 3 (in 7 volumes)

O Tempo e o Vento (Time and the Wind) is a trilogy of historical novels by the Brazilian author Erico Verissimo, published between 1949 and 1962 and widely regarded as one of the greatest works of Brazilian literature of the 20th century. Composed of O Continente (1949), O Retrato (1951), and O Arquipélago (1961–1962), the trilogy spans seven volumes and follows two centuries of history in the state of Rio Grande do Sul, from the Jesuit Missions and the arrival of the first settlers in 1745 to the end of the Estado Novo dictatorship in 1945, through the multigenerational saga of the Terra, Cambará, and Amaral families in the fictional city of Santa Fé.

Note: the first volume, O Continente, was translated into English by L. L. Barrett and published by Macmillan in 1951 under the title Time and the Wind, giving the misleading impression that it represents the whole trilogy. O Retrato and O Arquipélago have not been translated into English.

Across more than three thousand pages, Verissimo constructs an epic panorama encompassing wars, revolutions, racial mixing, political transformations, and the forging of a cultural identity. For critic Flávio Loureiro Chaves, the work gave Brazilian historical fiction "the key to its formal resolution" and marks "one of the strongest points of our dialogue with Western literature." Scholars Bordini and Zilberman define it as a "founding novel" that accomplished what Brazilian writers had long attempted: to show the composition of the nation across its social, ethnic, and economic dimensions.

The trilogy exerted a recognized influence on writers throughout Latin America. Gabriel García Márquez, winner of the Nobel Prize in Literature in 1982, stated that O Tempo e o Vento was one of three novels he studied before writing One Hundred Years of Solitude, and that the fictional city of Macondo was inspired by Santa Fé.

== Background and origins ==
The idea for O Tempo e o Vento emerged long before its writing. As early as 1939, Verissimo recorded in his notes a desire to write a sweeping "cyclical novel" about the history of Rio Grande do Sul, provisionally titled Caravana. The project was shelved when the approaching World War II led him to write Saga (1940) first, a novel about a Gaúcho pacifist confronting European totalitarianism. He returned to the original project only in 1947, and the writing of O Continente, the first volume, took two years. The complete writing process extended from 1947 to 1962, when the last volume of O Arquipélago was published – fifteen years after it began.

The project required substantial historical research. Verissimo immersed himself in the records of the Jesuit Missions, in chronicles of the 19th-century wars (Ragamuffin War, Paraguayan War, Federalist Revolution), and in documentation about the early urbanisation of Rio Grande do Sul. The fictional city of Santa Fé, the stage of the entire saga, was modelled on Cruz Alta, Verissimo's hometown, and on other small towns of the Gaucho Pampas.

The work was also deeply shaped by the author's personal history. In his memoirs (Solo de Clarineta), Verissimo recounts the traumatic separation of his parents during his adolescence, at a time when divorce carried severe social stigma, and how his mother – a seamstress who supported him and his brother alone – became the model for the trilogy's great female characters: Ana Terra, Bibiana, Maria Valéria, women who sustain entire families while the men around them are lost to wars, vices, and ambition.

== The trilogy ==
=== O Continente (2 volumes) ===
The first part was published in Porto Alegre in 1949 and narrates the formation of the state of Rio Grande do Sul through the Terra, Cambará, Caré, and Amaral families, from 1745 through the Federalist Revolution of 1893–1895. The story begins with the arrival of a pregnant woman at the Jesuit Missions of the Seven Peoples. Her son, Pedro Missioneiro, will later father a child with Ana Terra, a settler woman of Paulista origin – and their descendants will form the Terra-Cambará lineage that runs through the entire trilogy.

O Continente is formally innovative in structure: seven large narrative chapters — each nearly a self-contained novel — are interspersed with fragments of O Sobrado (The Townhouse), a narrative set in the "present" of the story that functions as both frame and climax. This back-and-forth between past and present, with the historical gap narrowing as the past approaches the present, gives the volume a dynamic formal quality that was remarkable for Brazilian literature of the period.

==== Chapters ====
Chapter	Translation	Summary
A Fonte	The Fountain	Set in 1745 at the Jesuit Missions of the Seven Peoples. Father Alonso, a Spanish Jesuit haunted by a past near-crime, becomes the guardian of Pedro Missioneiro, a mixed-race child born of an indigenous mother. Pedro grows up to play a key role in the Battle of Caiboaté and the destruction of the Missions under the Treaty of Madrid.
Ana Terra	Ana Terra	Ana Terra, daughter of Paulista settlers near the Rio Pardo, is forbidden by her father from her relationship with Pedro Missioneiro. After a Castilian raid destroys her family, she leaves alone with her son – Pedro Terra – and rebuilds her life in Santa Fé. She becomes the founding matriarch of the Terra-Cambará lineage.
Um Certo Capitão Rodrigo	A Certain Captain Rodrigo	Captain Rodrigo Cambará, a daring and charismatic adventurer, arrives unexpectedly in Santa Fé and immediately makes both friends and enemies. After winning a duel against Bento Amaral – the son of the town's despotic oligarch – he marries Bibiana Terra, Ana Terra's granddaughter. He dies leading a charge during the Ragamuffin War.
A Teiniaguá	The Teiniaguá	Follows Bolívar Cambará, son of Captain Rodrigo and Bibiana, and his obsession with an indigenous woman named Teiniaguá — a figure tied to the legend of the Salamanca do Jarau, one of the founding myths of Gaucho oral tradition. The chapter draws the trilogy closest to magical and folkloric register.
A Guerra	The War	The title refers both to the Paraguayan War — which brings economic and human ruin to Santa Fé — and to the domestic battle between Bibiana and her daughter-in-law Luzia Silva Cambará for control of the Sobrado and the upbringing of young Licurgo, after the death of Bolívar.
Ismália Caré	Ismália Caré	The transitional chapter linking all of O Continentes storylines with its climax, O Sobrado. Santa Fé has become a city. Licurgo Cambará, now an adult, founds a republican club and frees his slaves under the influence of a friend and the growing abolitionist press. The chapter is named after Licurgo's former lover, who is constantly discussed but only appears in person at the very end.
O Sobrado	The Townhouse	The framing narrative, set in the 1890s. Licurgo Cambará, intendant of Santa Fé, is besieged in the family mansion by the forces of the Amaral family's descendants during the Federalist Revolution. Unlike the other chapters, O Sobrado is fragmented and interspersed throughout O Continente, interspersed between the chronological chapters as flashbacks that narrow toward the present until both timelines converge.

=== O Retrato (2 volumes) ===
O Retrato (The Portrait) is the most philosophically dense volume of the trilogy. The story is set in Santa Fé in the early 20th century, as the city begins a hesitant process of urbanisation while still deeply shaped by rural culture. At its centre is Dr. Rodrigo Terra Cambará — son of Licurgo and namesake of Captain Rodrigo – who returns to Santa Fé after studying medicine in Porto Alegre with an appetite for European sophistication: French wines, opera, and grand political ambitions. His veneer of modernity gradually gives way to the moral degradation that will define him, in an explicit reference to The Picture of Dorian Gray by Oscar Wilde: a portrait of Rodrigo at his peak, painted by his friend Don Pepe, remains hanging in the Sobrado as a fixed reminder of the man he once was.

The novel's dialogues between Dr. Rodrigo, Lieutenant Rubim Veloso, and Colonel Jairo Bittencourt incorporate the three dominant intellectual currents of the late 19th and early 20th centuries in Brazil: the positivism of Auguste Comte, the social evolutionism of Herbert Spencer, and the concept of the superman developed by Friedrich Nietzsche. Through Lieutenant Rubim – who embodies Nietzscheanism in its most radical, white-supremacist form – Verissimo exposes ideological rationalisation for violence and domination, not to validate it, but to dissect it with corrosive irony.

==== Chapters ====
Chapter	Translation	Notes
Rosa-dos-Ventos	Wind Rose	Set in 1945 (the "present"). Dr. Rodrigo returns to Santa Fé terminally ill, following the fall of the Vargas dictatorship he had supported.
O Chantecler	The Chanticleer	Flashback to Dr. Rodrigo's early adulthood and first steps in politics.
A Sombra do Anjo	The Shadow of the Angel	Flashback continuing the arc of his political and moral decline.
Uma Vela para o Negrinho	A Candle to the Negrinho	Set in 1945. Named after a Gaucho folklore figure. Closes the narrative back in the present, completing the frame opened by Rosa-dos-Ventos.

=== O Arquipélago (3 volumes) ===
The final part of the trilogy was published eleven years after O Retrato, by which time the literary world had largely stopped expecting a continuation – Verissimo had suffered a heart attack and his health was fragile. O Arquipélago (The Archipelago) shifts part of the action to Rio de Janeiro, then the national capital, with Dr. Rodrigo elected as a federal deputy. For the first time, characters cease to be spectators of History and participate directly in national events, interacting with real historical figures such as Getúlio Vargas, Osvaldo Aranha, and Luís Carlos Prestes.

Within the dying patriarch's fractured family, the contradictions of an era shaped by a radical transformation of customs – under the influence of American cinema and the rise of totalitarian movements – are played out among characters ranging from committed communists to cynical opportunists. At the centre stands Floriano Cambará, Dr. Rodrigo's son and the writer's clearest alter ego, who maintains a critical, non-aligned stance and embodies Verissimo's own humanist values. The novel also introduces an unprecedented narrative device: a chapter narrated entirely by Sílvia, wife of Jango Cambará, offering an external feminine perspective on the family and its men.

== Characters ==
=== Main characters ===
O Tempo e o Vento features a large cast of characters whose lives span two centuries. Ana Terra and Captain Rodrigo Cambará are widely considered archetypes of Brazilian literature.

Character	Family	Volume(s)	Description
Father Alonso	—	O Continente	A Spanish Jesuit born in Pamplona, stationed at the Seven Peoples Missions. Haunted by guilt over a near-murder he intended but never committed, he becomes guardian and educator of Pedro Missioneiro. His silver dagger – a symbol of guilt carried by intent, not action – passes through generations as an object of memory and identity.
Pedro Missioneiro	—	O Continente	A mixed-race child of an indigenous mother and unknown white father, raised by Father Alonso. His forbidden relationship with Ana Terra produces the son – Pedro Terra – who founds the Terra-Cambará lineage. His mestizo origin is the symbolic root of the family's identity and Verissimo's challenge to the myth of a purely European Gaucho heritage.
Ana Terra	Terra	O Continente	Daughter of Paulista settlers near the Rio Pardo. After her family is destroyed in a Castilian raid, she rebuilds her life alone with her illegitimate son in Santa Fé. The founding matriarch of the Terra-Cambará lineage and one of the trilogy's archetypal figures of female resilience.
Captain Rodrigo Cambará	Cambará	O Continente	A daring, charismatic adventurer and archetypal Gaucho. He arrives in Santa Fé, wins a duel against the oligarch's son, marries Bibiana Terra, and dies heroically during the Ragamuffin War.
Bibiana Terra Cambará	Terra/Cambará	O Continente	Ana Terra's granddaughter and Captain Rodrigo's wife. A woman of exceptional stoicism who sustains the family and the Sobrado for decades. Critic Regina Zilberman describes her as a "duplication" of her grandmother: she carries Ana's name twice over (bi-ana).
Licurgo Cambará	Cambará	O Continente / O Retrato	Bibiana's grandson and intendant of Santa Fé. A committed abolitionist and republican, he is the protagonist of the siege to the Sobrado during the Federalist Revolution.
Colonel Ricardo Amaral Neto	Amaral	O Continente	The despotic oligarch of Santa Fé and the central antagonist of O Continente. His feud with Captain Rodrigo – and later with the Cambarás – spans generations and culminates in the siege of the Sobrado.
Dr. Rodrigo Terra Cambará	Cambará	O Retrato / O Arquipélago	Licurgo's son and namesake of Captain Rodrigo. A physician and politician, protagonist of O Retrato. His arc – from sophisticated liberal to morally degraded supporter of the Vargas dictatorship – mirrors the trajectory of Dorian Gray.
Lieutenant Rubim Veloso	—	O Retrato	The character who most radically embodies Nietzscheanism in the trilogy, with an openly white-supremacist worldview. Verissimo uses him not as a mouthpiece but as a target of corrosive irony, exposing ideological rationalisation for violence.
Maria Valéria Terra	Terra	O Retrato / O Arquipélago	A matriarch of the intermediate generation. Single, quiet, and deeply wise, she inherits Bibiana's role as the moral centre of the Sobrado in the second and third volumes.
Floriano Cambará	Cambará	O Arquipélago	A writer and Verissimo's most direct alter ego. He maintains a non-aligned, humanist stance amid the political extremisms of the Vargas Era, refusing both fascism and communism.
Jango Cambará	Cambará	O Arquipélago	The third son of Dr. Rodrigo. The dispersal of Captain Rodrigo's defining qualities across the three brothers (Floriano, Eduardo, and Jango) is a metaphor for the dilution of the family's founding values over time.
Sílvia	—	O Arquipélago	Wife of Jango Cambará. She narrates the trilogy's only chapter told entirely in the first person by an adult woman, offering a critical external perspective on the Cambará family.

=== Supporting characters ===
Character	Family	Volume(s)	Description
Juca Terra	Terra	O Continente	A Bandeirante muleteer, Ana Terra's grandfather. Captivated by the region during a trading journey to the Colônia do Sacramento, he obtained a land grant near the Rio Pardo — the first Terra to settle in the south.
Pedro Terra	Terra	O Continente	Son of Ana Terra and Pedro Missioneiro. He grows up in Santa Fé and becomes patriarch of the Terra family there. Father of Bibiana and Juvenal; it is he who shelters the wounded Captain Rodrigo after the duel.
Juvenal Terra	Terra	O Continente	Pedro Terra's son and Bibiana's brother. He becomes Captain Rodrigo's business partner in the store they open together in Santa Fé, embodying the stability and cordiality that his adventurous brother-in-law lacks.
Florêncio Terra	Terra	O Continente	A Terra cousin; father of Alice, who will marry Licurgo Cambará. His family represents the intertwining of the Terra and Cambará lineages in Santa Fé's second generation.
Bolívar Cambará	Cambará	O Continente	Son of Captain Rodrigo and Bibiana. His premature death triggers the domestic war between his wife Luzia and his mother Bibiana over control of the Sobrado and the upbringing of his heir, Licurgo.
Luzia Silva Cambará	Cambará	O Continente	Bolívar's wife. She wages an incessant daily battle against Bibiana for dominance of the Sobrado – one of the most psychologically intense domestic tensions in O Continente.
Bento Amaral	Amaral	O Continente	Son of Colonel Amaral. He loses the duelling match against Captain Rodrigo and, in an act of cowardice, draws a concealed pistol to wound him. He embodies the moral degeneration of the oligarchic family his father represents with raw force.
Carl Winter	—	O Continente	The German physician of Santa Fé, present across multiple chapters. A humanist and rationalist in a world driven by political passion; it is he who ironically diagnoses the war between Bibiana and Luzia as a "race" to see which woman outlives the other.
Toríbio Cambará	Cambará	O Retrato / O Arquipélago	Licurgo's eldest son and Dr. Rodrigo's brother. He serves as mediator between his conservative father and his modernising brother, embodying the unstable equilibrium between two worlds coexisting in early 20th-century Santa Fé.
Flora Quadros Cambará	Cambará	O Retrato / O Arquipélago	Dr. Rodrigo's wife. She witnesses and endures the progressive degradation of her husband, becoming a figure of silent suffering that echoes the matriarchs of earlier generations.
Colonel Jairo Bittencourt	—	O Retrato	Represents positivism in the philosophical dialogues of O Retrato. Together with Lieutenant Rubim (Nietzscheanism) and Don Pepe (anarchism), he forms the trio that maps the ideological spectrum of early 20th-century Brazil.
Don Pepe	—	O Retrato	A Spanish anarchist painter living in Santa Fé. He coexists harmoniously with positivists and Nietzscheans in O Retrato's philosophical debates, representing the libertarian wing of the period's ideological landscape.
Eduardo Cambará	Cambará	O Arquipélago	Dr. Rodrigo's second son and Floriano's brother. He represents the political opportunism of the Vargas Era, in direct contrast to his brother's ethical non-alignment.
Toríbio Rezende	—	O Continente	A friend and intellectual influence on Licurgo Cambará. Under his influence, Licurgo founds a republican club in Santa Fé and becomes an abolitionist, freeing his slaves.

== Major themes ==
=== Time, memory, and identity ===
The title encapsulates the work's philosophical project: the tension between time — which accumulates, sediments, and transforms — and wind — which disperses, destroys, and renews. Verissimo uses the family saga as a metaphor for Gaucho and Brazilian identity, showing how character traits, vices, and virtues repeat and transform across generations. The formal device of O Sobrado's fragmented timeline is not merely structural: it materialises the novel's central argument — that the past returns in fragments ever closer to the present, until the two finally converge at the siege.

=== Race, miscegenation, and slavery ===
One of the trilogy's most important and least-discussed dimensions is its challenge to two persistent myths of Gaucho historical memory: the notion of an ethnically European Gaucho identity, and the idea that slavery was marginal to southern Brazil. Through Pedro Missioneiro's mixed indigenous-white ancestry as the root of the entire Terra-Cambará lineage, and through the treatment of slavery as a live moral and political tension in O Continente and Ismália Caré, Verissimo constructs a vision of Rio Grande do Sul that is radically more complex and inclusive than official memory allowed.

=== Philosophy, politics, and ideology ===
O Retrato is the most philosophically engaged of the three volumes. Its dialogues map the major intellectual currents that shaped the Brazilian intelligentsia between the late 19th and early 20th centuries – Comtean positivism, Spencerian social evolutionism, and Nietzschean thought – across characters who embody each position. Verissimo does not endorse any of these systems; instead, he uses their confrontation to reveal the ways in which ideology rationalises power and violence.

=== War, politics, and history ===
O Tempo e o Vento is a sustained meditation on the political violence that shaped Rio Grande do Sul and Brazil. The Ragamuffin War, the Paraguayan War, the Federalist Revolution, and the Vargas Era are not decorative backdrops: they destroy families, define characters, and expose the contradictions of a society. Verissimo's own stance is consistently humanist — a refusal of fanaticism from any direction, and a defence of individual ethics and freedom against all forms of totalitarianism.

=== Female characters ===
While the male characters of O Continente project the image of the bold, patriarchal Gaucho, the women of the trilogy are, in Verissimo's own construction, its real centres of gravity. Ana Terra, Bibiana, and Maria Valéria are the matriarchs who sustain the family across generations, while the men around them are consumed by wars, vices, and political ambitions. Critics have pointed to the scissors Bibiana uses to cut the umbilical cords of successive generations as the central symbol of this matrilineal continuity — the object through which the meaning of Gaucho identity is literally passed on. Verissimo's biographers trace this emphasis to his mother's resilience during his parents' separation, which left her as the sole support of the family.

== Critical reception ==
Verissimo's critical reception began under a sign of resistance. His work displaced southern Brazilian literature from its regionalist groove toward a more universal dimension for which the local critical establishment was unprepared. From the beginning of his career, he was caught in an uncomfortable ideological paradox: leftists accused him of petit-bourgeois timidity for refusing party alignment, while the Estado Novo police surveilled him as a subversive for the social critique in his novels. He consistently rejected the label of engaged writer, preferring to define himself simply as a "storyteller" committed not to ideology but to the defence of ethics, freedom, and human dignity. Critic Daniel Fresnot characterised him as a left-liberal — a left-leaning liberal whose refusal of pamphleteering was, in itself, a courageous political position.

With the publication of O Continente in 1949, reception began to shift. The trilogy was progressively recognised as a landmark of 20th-century Brazilian literature, frequently discussed alongside João Guimarães Rosa's Grande Sertão: Veredas, Graciliano Ramos's Barren Lives, and Rachel de Queiroz's O Quinze. For Flávio Loureiro Chaves, the work gave Brazilian historical fiction "the key to its formal resolution." Bordini and Zilberman define it as a "founding novel" in the tradition of the Generation of 1930, praising its "dialogical sense, which avoids the reconciliation of opposites in terms of the cultural voices that resound within it." Antônio Candido praised Verissimo's ability to look at society "with straight eyes."

== Influence and legacy ==
=== Santa Fé and Macondo ===
The trilogy's influence extended beyond Brazil across Latin America. The most documented connection is with Gabriel García Márquez, who stated that O Tempo e o Vento was one of three novels he studied in preparation for writing One Hundred Years of Solitude, and that the fictional city of Macondo drew directly on Santa Fé. García Márquez's son Rodrigo García and Verissimo's son Luís Fernando Veríssimo have both confirmed the connection publicly. Academic studies at PUC-SP and UFRGS have documented the structural parallels in detail: both sagas feature circular time, generational repetition of psychological types, and a mythical provincial space — Santa Fé and Macondo — that functions as a microcosm of national history.

=== The original title ===
The title Verissimo originally gave the trilogy was O Vento e o Tempo — The Wind and Time — and it remained as such when the manuscript was sent to Editora Globo for typesetting. Only when the first edition was already about to be released was the title reversed. The difference is philosophically significant: in O Vento e o Tempo, wind — the force of change and agitation — precedes and governs time; in O Tempo e o Vento, time is the primary and permanent dimension, and wind acts upon it as a transient force. The four-word reversal summarises the thesis of the entire trilogy.

== Adaptations ==
O Tempo e o Vento is one of the most frequently adapted works in Brazilian literary history. The epic tone of O Continente, particularly through the characters of Ana Terra and Captain Rodrigo, has made it the most sought-after volume for adaptation.

=== Film ===
O Sobrado (1956)
Directed by Walter George Durst and Cassiano Gabus Mendes. The first screen adaptation, focusing on the siege of the Terra-Cambará mansion during the Federalist Revolution.

Um Certo Capitão Rodrigo (A Certain Captain Rodrigo, 1971)
Directed by Anselmo Duarte, with Francisco di Franco as Captain Rodrigo and Elza de Castro as Bibiana.

Ana Terra (1972)
Directed by Durval Garcia, with Rossana Ghessa in the title role.

O Tempo e o Vento (2013)
Directed by Jayme Monjardim, loosely based on O Continente. The cast includes Thiago Lacerda (Captain Rodrigo), Cléo Pires (Ana Terra), Marjorie Estiano, and Fernanda Montenegro (Bibiana at different life stages).

=== Television ===
O Tempo e o Vento (1985) — TV Globo
A 12-part miniseries adapted and directed by Doc Comparato and Paulo José, based on O Continente. It won the Coral Negro (Black Coral) prize at the Havana Film Festival in 1986, after being personally championed by Gabriel García Márquez as jury president.

=== Theatre ===
The trilogy has been adapted for the stage in multiple productions, with particular prominence in Rio Grande do Sul, where several stagings have become landmarks of Gaucho theatre.

== Historical allusions ==
O Tempo e o Vento is a historical novel in the fullest sense. The major conflicts depicted – the Ragamuffin War, the Paraguayan War, the Federalist Revolution, the Revolution of 1923, and the Vargas Era — are real, as are the political figures who appear as characters or are referenced in the text, including Bento Gonçalves da Silva, Júlio de Castilhos, Borges de Medeiros, Pinheiro Machado, Flores da Cunha, Luís Carlos Prestes, Osvaldo Aranha, and Getúlio Vargas.

The city of Santa Fé and the Terra-Cambará family are entirely fictional. While Santa Fé's history is representative of many towns in southern Brazil – most explicitly Cruz Alta, where Verissimo grew up – the Terra-Cambará family is not based on any specific historical family.
