= Province of Georgia =

Former British province in North America

- Province of Great Britain
- 1732–1776
- British Red Ensign Royal coat of arms

Anthem
- "God Save the King" (Note: There was no authorized version of the national anthem as the words were a matter of tradition; only the first verse was usually sung. No statute had been enacted designating "God Save the King" as the official anthem. In the English tradition, such laws are not necessary; proclamation and usage are sufficient to make it the national anthem. "God Save the King" also served as the Royal anthem for certain royal colonies. The words King, he, him, his were replaced by Queen, she, her when the monarch was female.)
- Capital: Savannah
- Area
  - Coordinates: 32°4′51″N 81°5′28″W
- Government
  - Type: Proprietary colony (1732–1755); Royal colony (1755–1776)
- Monarch
  - 1732–1760: George II
  - 1760–1776: George III
- Governor
  - 1732–1743: James Oglethorpe (first)
  - 1762–1776 1779–1782: James Wright (last)
- Legislature: General Assembly
  - Upper house: Council
  - Lower house: Commons House of Assembly
- Historical era: Georgian era
  - Trustees Charter: June 9, 1732
  - Ceded to the crown of Great Britain: January 2, 1755
  - Declaration of Independence from Great Britain: July 4, 1776
Preceded by	Succeeded by
Province of South Carolina	Georgia (U.S. state)
- Today part of: United States: Alabama; Georgia; Mississippi

The Province of Georgia, also known as the Colony of Georgia, was a province of Great Britain in America that existed from 1732 to 1776. It was one of the five Southern colonies and one of the thirteen American colonies. The monarch of Great Britain was represented by the Governor of Georgia, until the American colonies declared independence at Philadelphia on July 4, 1776.

== History ==
=== Settlement ===
The English colony of Georgia was planned as a utopian society with an integrated physical, economic and social design influenced by the ideals of James Harrington. Oglethorpe envisioned a colony which would serve as a haven for English subjects who had been imprisoned for debt and "the worthy poor." General Oglethorpe imposed laws that many colonists disagreed with, such as the banning of alcoholic beverages. He disagreed with slavery and thought a system of smallholdings more appropriate than the large plantations common in the colonies just to the north. However, land grants were not as large as most colonists would have preferred.

Another reason for the founding of the colony was as a buffer state and a "garrison province" which would defend the southern British colonies from Spanish Florida. Oglethorpe imagined a province populated by "sturdy farmers" who could guard the border; because of this, the colony's charter prohibited slavery. The ban on slavery was lifted by 1751 and the colony became a royal colony by 1752, taking over from the Trustees for the Establishment of the Colony of Georgia in America.

Although many believe that the colony was formed for the imprisoned, the colony was actually formed as a place of no slavery. Oglethorpe did have the vision to make it a place for debtors, but it transformed into a royal colony. The following is an historical accounting of these first English settlers sent to Georgia:

A committee was appointed to visit the jails and obtain the discharge of such poor prisoners as were worthy, carefully investigating character, circumstances and antecedents.

Thirty-five families, numbering one hundred and twenty persons, were selected.

On the 16th of November, 1732, the emigrants embarked at Gravesend on the ship Anne ... arriving January 13th [1733] in the harbor of Charleston, S. C. ... They set sail the day following ... into Port Royal, some eighty miles southward, to be conveyed in small vessels to the river Savannah.

Oglethorpe continued up the river to scout a location suitable for settlement. On February 12, 1733, Oglethorpe led the settlers to their arrival at Yamacraw Bluff, in what is now the city of Savannah, and established a camp with the help of a local elderly Creek chief, Tomochichi. A Yamacraw Indian village had occupied the site, but Oglethorpe arranged for the Indians to move. The day is still celebrated as Georgia Day.

== Trustees Charter ==
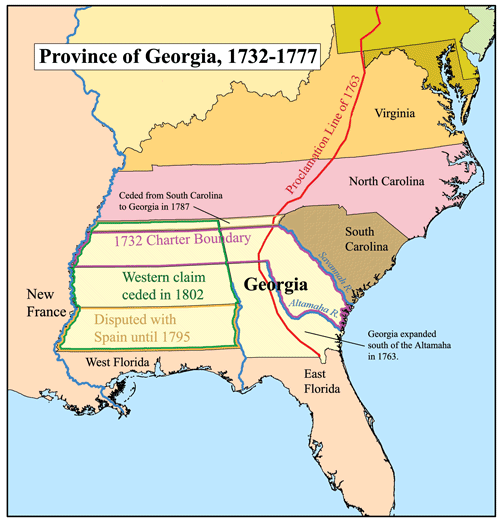
Boundary map of colonial Georgia

The Privy Council approved the establishment charter on June 9, 1732, and for the next two decades the council of trustees governed the province, with the aid of annual subsidies from Parliament. However, after many difficulties and the departure of Oglethorpe, the trustees proved unable to manage the proprietary colony, and on June 23, 1752, it was ceded to the crown of Great Britain, one year before the expiration of the charter. On January 2, 1755.

The colony's corporate charter was granted to General James Oglethorpe on April 21, 1732, by George II, for whom the colony was named. The charter was finalized by the King's privy council on June 9, 1732.

The original charter specified the colony as being between the Savannah and Altamaha Rivers, up to their headwaters (the headwaters of the Altamaha are on the Ocmulgee River), and then extending westward "to the south seas." The area within the charter had previously been part of the original grant of the Province of Carolina, which was closely linked to Georgia.

The original land grant of the Province of Georgia included a narrow strip of land that extended west to the Pacific Ocean.

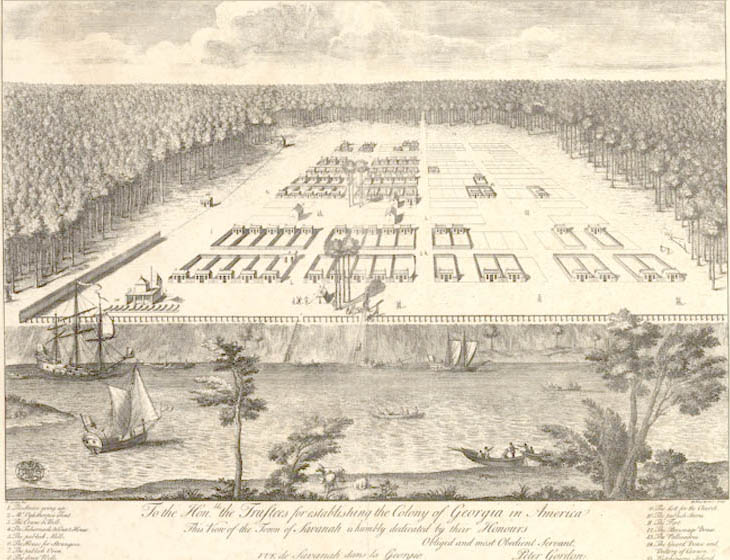
18th-century map of Savannah, Georgia

From 1732 until 1758, the minor civil divisions were districts and towns. In 1758, without Indian permission, the Province of Georgia was divided into eight parishes by the Act of the Assembly of Georgia on March 15. The Town and District of Savannah was named Christ Church Parish. The District of Abercorn and Goshen, plus the District of Ebenezer, was named the Parish of St. Matthew. The District of Halifax was named the Parish of St. George. The District of Augusta was named the Parish of St. Paul. The Town of Hardwick and the District of Ogeechee, including the island of Ossabaw, was named the Parish of St. Philip. From Sunbury in the District of Midway and Newport to the south branch of Newport, including the islands of St. Catherine and Bermuda, was named the Parish of St. John. The Town and District of Darien, to the Altamaha River, including the islands of Sapelo and Eastwood and the sea islands north of Egg Island, was named the Parish of St. Andrew. The Town and District of Frederica, including the islands of Great and Little St. Simons, along with the adjacent islands, was named the Parish of St. James.

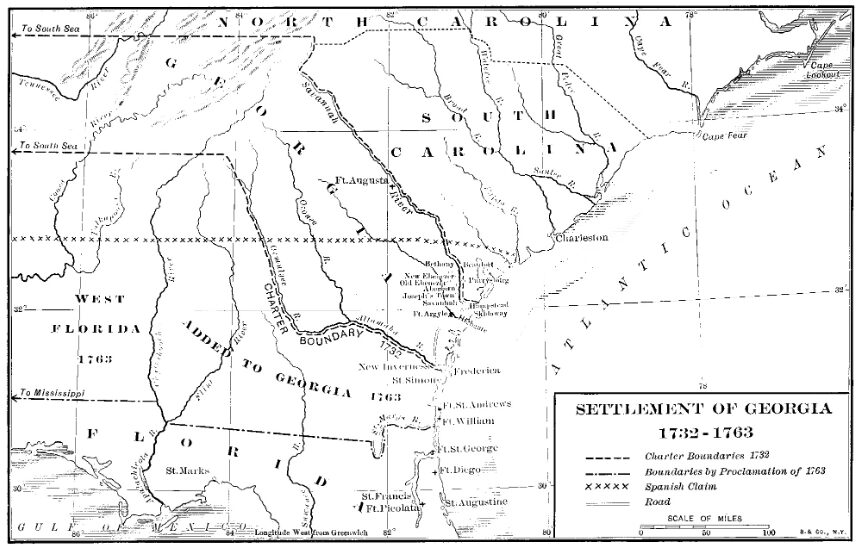

Following Britain's victory in the French and Indian War, King George III issued the Proclamation of 1763. One of its provisions was to extend Georgia's southern boundary from the Altamaha River to the St. Marys River. Two years later, on March 25, 1765, Governor James Wright approved an act of the General Assembly creating four new parishes – St. David, St. Patrick, St. Thomas, and St. Mary – in the recently acquired land, and it further assigned Jekyll Island to St. James Parish.

The Georgia colony had had a sluggish beginning. James Oglethorpe did not allow liquor, and colonists who came at the trustees' expense were not allowed to own more than 50 acres (0.20 km^{2}) of land for their farm in addition to a 60 foot by 90 foot plot in town. Those who paid their own way could bring ten indentured servants and would receive 500 acres of land. Additional land could neither be acquired nor sold. Discontent grew in the colony because of these restrictions, and Oglethorpe lifted them. With slavery, liquor, and land acquisition the colony developed much faster. Slavery had been permitted from 1749. There was some internal opposition to slavery, particularly from Scottish settlers, but by the time of the War of Independence, Georgia was much like the other Southern colonies.

== War of Jenkins' Ear ==
In the 1742 invasion of Georgia, Spanish forces based in Spanish Florida attempted to seize and occupy disputed territory held by the British colony of Georgia. The campaign was part of a larger conflict which became known as the War of Jenkins' Ear. Local British forces under the command of the Governor James Oglethorpe rallied and defeated the Spaniards at the Battle of Bloody Marsh and the Battle of Gully Hole Creek, forcing them to withdraw. Britain's ownership of Georgia was formally recognized by Spain in the subsequent Treaty of Madrid.

== American Revolution ==
During the American Revolution Georgia's population was at first divided about exactly how to respond to revolutionary activities and heightened tensions in other provinces. After violence broke out in Massachusetts in 1775, radical Patriots stormed the royal magazine at Savannah and carried off its ammunition, took control of the provincial government, and drove many Loyalists out of the province. In 1776 a provincial congress had declared independence and created a constitution for the new state. Georgia also served as the staging ground for several important raids into British-controlled Florida.

In 1777 the original eight counties of the state of Georgia were created. Prior to that Georgia had been divided into local government units called parishes. Settlement had been limited to the near vicinity of the Savannah River; the western area of the new state remained under the control of the Creek Indian Confederation.

James Wright, the last Royal Governor of the Province of Georgia, dismissed the royal assembly in 1775. He was briefly a prisoner of the revolutionaries before escaping to a British warship in February 1776. During the American Revolutionary War Wright was the only royal governor to regain control of part of his colony after British forces captured Savannah on December 29, 1778. British and Loyalist forces restored large areas of Georgia to colonial rule, especially along the coast, while Patriots continued to maintain an independent governor, congress, and militia in other areas. In 1779 the British repelled an attack of militia, Continental Army, and French military and naval forces on Savannah. The 1781 siege of Augusta, by militia and Continental forces, restored it to Patriot control. When the war was lost for Britain, Wright and British forces evacuated Savannah on July 11, 1782. After that the Province of Georgia ceased to exist as a British colony.

The new state of Georgia was a member of the Second Continental Congress, a signer of the Declaration of Independence, the tenth state to ratify the Articles of Confederation on July 24, 1778, and the fourth state to be admitted to the Union under the U.S. Constitution, on January 2, 1788.

== Demographics ==
Population
Year	1740	1750	1760	1770	1780
Pop.	2,021	15,200	19,578	33,375	66,071
±%	—	+652.1%	+28.8%	+70.5%	+98.0%
Source: 1740–1760; 1770–1780

Preceded by Southern part of the Province of South Carolina; 1712–1732	Province of Georgia; 1732–1776	Succeeded by State of Georgia; 1776–present
