= Russinho =

Russinho is a nickname. Notable people with the name include:

- Russinho (footballer, 1902-1992), full name Moacyr Siqueira de Queiroz, Brazilian football midfielder
- Russinho (footballer, 1917-1958), full name David Russowski, Brazilian football forward
