= Sociedad Honoraria Hispánica =

American honor society for Spanish and Portuguese

- SHH
- Founded: 1953; 73 years ago
- Type: Honor
- Affiliation: American Association of Teachers of Spanish and Portuguese
- Status: Active
- Emphasis: Spanish and Portuguese
- Scope: National
- Motto: ¡Todos a una! "All Together for One Goal"
- Colors: Red and Gold
- Flower: Carnation
- Publication: Albricias
- Chapters: 2,900+
- Headquarters: 160 Rail Road, Ste 3 Chesterton, Indiana 46304; United States
- Website: www.aatspshh.org

The Sociedad Honoraria Hispánica (the national honor society for Spanish and Portuguese) is an academic honor society focused on Spanish language and Portuguese language excellence in secondary education and promotes a continuity of interest in Spanish and Portuguese studies. It is sponsored by the American Association of Teachers of Spanish and Portuguese.

== History ==
Sociedad Honoraria Hispánica was established as the Spanish National Honor Society in 1953 in the United States. It became Sociedad Honoraria Hispánica in 1959. The society recognizes the achievement of high school students in Spanish and Portuguese. It also encourages interest in Hispanic and Luso-Brazilian studies.

== Symbols ==
The society's colors are red and gold. Its fower is the carnation. Its motto is ¡Todos a una! ("All Together for One Goal").

== Membership ==
Each member must have completed at least three semesters of Spanish or Portuguese with an honor average as defined by the local chapter. The potential member must be enrolled in Spanish at the time of induction and is required to maintain an "honor grade" or GPA, which correlates with the SHH's mission of high academic achievement.

== Activities ==
Albricias is the quarterly publication of the Spanish Honor Society. Students may submit writings and artworks to the magazine. It also features reflective writings from the students who have won the college scholarships and/or travel awards.

Sociedad Honoraria Hispánica provides over $160,000 in awards to its chapters and members. The most prestigious awards are college scholarships to sixty high school seniors (Joseph Adams Senior Scholarship) and travel awards to 24 high school juniors from around the country (Bertie Green Travel Awards). The Bertie Green Travel Award destinations have included summer trips to Argentina, Peru, Mexico, and Spain. Each chapter can only nominate one student for each of those awards. There are also several awards for chapters and sponsors each year.

== Chapters ==
As of 2024, there are more than 2,900 chapters of Sociedad Honoraria Hispánica. Each chapter has its own unique name, which is associated with some aspect of the Spanish or Portuguese culture.

== See also ==
- German National Honor Society
- National Honor Society
- Société Honoraire de Français
