= National Spanish Examinations =

Spanish online standardized assessment

The National Spanish Examinations are online, standardized assessment tools given voluntarily by over 3000 teachers throughout the United States to measure proficiency and achievement of students who are studying Spanish as a second language.

The National Spanish Examinations are the chief assessment tool of the American Association of Teachers of Spanish and Portuguese.

== Purpose ==
The purpose of the National Spanish Examination is

1. to recognize achievement in the study of the Spanish language

2. to promote proficiency in interpretive communication in the Spanish language

3. to assess the national standards as they pertain to learning Spanish

4. to stimulate further interest in the teaching and learning of Spanish

Also:

Many teachers state that they use the National Spanish Examination to prepare students to take other standardized tests such as AP, IB, SAT II and college placement exams.

Many administrators state that they can use data from the National Spanish Examination to create reports to show how their schools have improved over an academic year.

== Awards and Scholarships ==
NSE provides awards and scholarships to both teachers who administer the test and to students who score well on the test.

Teacher awards - The National Spanish Examination (NSE) is committed to providing teachers with opportunities to continue their professional development to design instruction and assessments from first-hand experiences with the Spanish language and culture. To this end, NSE offers scholarships for teachers to study abroad in Spain and Costa Rica through Modern Language Studies Abroad.

Student awards - NSE offers awards to students who score in the 75th percentile or better as follows:

- Gold medalists for students scoring at or above the 95th percentile
- Silver medalists for students scoring from the 85th through the 94th percentiles
- Bronze medalists for students scoring from the 75th through the 84th percentiles

Additionally, students who score in the 75th percentile or better may apply for:

- Global Citizen Scholarships for study at the Concordia Language Villages
- Junior Travel Awards
- Senior Scholarships

== Staff ==
The National Spanish Examinations are headed by Lisa Greenman.
