= The Adventures of the Red Airplane =

- Original title: As Aventuras do Avião Vermelho
- Language: Portuguese

The Adventures of the Red Airplane (Portuguese: As Aventuras do Avião Vermelho) is a 1936 book for children by the Brazilian author Érico Veríssimo.

Fernando is a naughty little boy. His father gives him a book of stories to keep him quiet. Fernando is entranced, especially by the tale of Captain Storm (Capitão Tormenta), who travels the world in his red airplane. Fernando decides he wants to be an aviator just like him. The father, doubtless pleased by his son's recent good behaviour, gives him a model airplane. Fernando, with his teddy bear Ruivo and his doll Chocolate, set out on their adventures. They visit the Moon, China, Africa and India, braving the hazards of storms, lightning, and attacks by hostile sparrows; and even venturing into the depths of the ocean – where the little red airplane turns into a little red submarine.

The book has been reprinted.

The 2014 Brazilian animated film As Aventuras do Avião Vermelho, directed by Frederico Pinto and José Maia, is based on the book.
