= Five Centuries of Spanish Literature =

Five Centuries of Spanish Literature: From the Cid through the Golden Age
- Author: Linton Lomas Barrett
- Language: Spanish (body), English (notes)
- Subject: Spanish literature
- Genre: textbook
- Publisher: Dodd, Mead & Company (first), Waveland Press (current)
- Publication date: 1962
- Publication place: United States
- Media type: trade paperback
- Pages: 368
- ISBN: 1-57766-319-5
- OCLC: 54357444

Five Centuries of Spanish Literature: From the Cid through the Golden Age is a popular textbook providing a selection of Spanish literature from the 12th through 17th centuries. First published in 1962.

The book is currently published by Waveland Press Inc.

== Table of contents ==
- Introduction
- Part I. The Medieval Period
  - The Twelfth Century
  - The Thirteenth Century
  - The Fourteenth Century
  - The Fifteenth Century
- Part II. The Modern Age
  - The Renaissance in Spain
  - Lyric Poetry of the Renaissance
  - Mystic Prose
  - Imaginative Fiction
  - The Theater before Lope de Vega
  - Cervantes and the Modern Novel
  - Poetry of the Seventeenth Century
  - The Drama from Lope de Vega to Calderón
