= Noite (novel) =

Book by Erico Verissimo

- First edition
- Author: Érico Veríssimo
- Language: Portuguese
- Genre: Drama, Mystery
- Publication date: 1954
- Publication place: Brazil
- Media type: Print (Paperback)

Noite (Night) is a novel written by Brazilian writer Érico Veríssimo in 1954.

== Plot summary ==
In the 1950s, a man finds himself in the middle of the streets of Porto Alegre with a wallet full of money... and no memory of any past events.

He finds two "vultures of the night", enigmatic noctivague figures with a high penchant for bohemian lifestyles. The "vultures" (called The Master and The Hunchback) take the man on a surrealistic journey through the darkest places of the city, to "enjoy the night": a funeral parlor, the emergency service of a hospital, a deluxe whorehouse and a low-level working class cabaret.

At the same time, the two enigmatic figures surreptitiously try to make the man-with-no-memory assume that he committed a horrendous crime early that night, in which a woman was the subject of a brutal passion-related crime and no perpetrator was yet arrested by the police.

The book has a unique atmosphere in depicting the low-level bohemy that crowded some places in the Brazilian urban legends.

In the 1980s, Brazilian film director José Louzeiro conducted a movie loosely based on the book.
