= Alves Redol =

Portuguese neorealist writer (1911–1969)

António Alves Redol
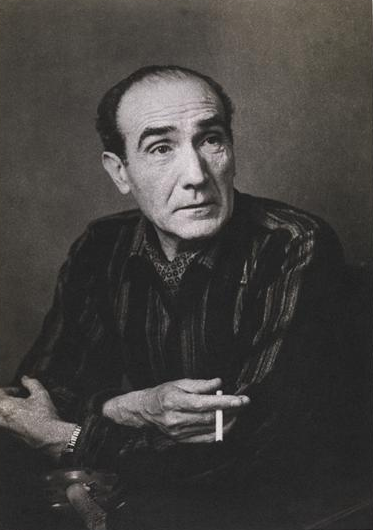
- Alves Redol, portrait by San Payo
- Born: 29 December 1911; Vila Franca de Xira, Portugal
- Died: 29 November 1969 (aged 57); Lisbon, Portugal
- Occupation: Writer

António Alves Redol (29 December 1911 – 29 November 1969) was a Portuguese neorealist writer.

== Life ==
Redol was born in 1911 in Vila Franca de Xira to Antonio Redol da Cruz, a shopkeeper, and Inocência Alves Redol. When he was fifteen, his articles were published in the local weekly newspaper, Vida Ribatejana. After finishing secondary school in 1927, he traveled to Portuguese Angola where he stayed for three years. His stay in Angola influenced Redol's worldview and later literature.

In 1936, he married Maria dos Santos Mota.

=== Early work, 1930–1940 ===
Redol published stories in the newspapers O Diabo and Sol Nascente in which he identified with the opposition to the Estado Novo. On 29 November 1936, in his first collaboration with O Diabo, the short story Kangondo was published. Kangondo had an African feel. Redol continued to work with the newspapers to publish chronicles and tales about the social issues in Ribatejo.

Redol would not become known for his work as a journalist; instead, he became famous for his novels. In 1939, he published his first book, Gaibéus. According to the author, Gaibéus was not intended as a piece of art, but rather as a report of the way of life of the peasants in Ribatejo. This novel started a series of works of fiction depicting the difficult lives of peasants and fishermen in Portugal in the first half of the 20th century: Marés (1941), Avieiros (1942), and Fanga (1943).

=== 1940—1950 ===
The publication of Fanga in 1943 coincided with the birth of his only son, António.

Redol's work is characterized by his commitment to study real-world experiences. Redol would meet with agricultural workers, such as the rice field workers near the Tagus river, and hear about their stories and experiences.

At the beginning of the 1940s, he joined the Portuguese Communist Party although it was then illegal to do so. Redol was arrested in May 1944. In November 1945, Redol was called to the Central Committee of the Movement of Democratic Unity (Movimento de Unidade Democrática) and chose to actively participate in the campaigns for the fake elections held by the Salazar regime.

In 1947, he was nominated for the position of Secretary-General of the Portuguese section of International PEN. In 1948, he participated in the World Congress of Intellectuals for Peace held in Wrocław, Poland.

Redol published the novel Horizonte Cerrado in 1948; it was the first volume of a trilogy about the Portuguese wine-making region of Douro. Os Homens e as Sombras (1951) and Vindima de Sangue (1953) completed the self-styled port wine cycle. He won the Ricardo Malheiros Prize for Horizonte Cerrado.

=== Later work, 1950–1970 ===
Alves Redol's later works include A Barca dos Sete Lemes (1958), Uma Fenda na Muralha (1959), and finally, Barranco de Cegos (1962), considered the pinnacle of his work.

A Barca dos Sete Lemes was translated into English by Linton Lomas Barrett and published as A Man with Seven Names by Knopf in 1964.

Alves Redol died in Lisbon in 1969.

== Works ==
=== Novels ===
- Gaibéus (1939)
- Marés (1941)
- Avieiros (1942)
- Fanga (1943)
- Anúncio (1945)
- Porto Manso (1946)
- Horizonte Cerrado (1949)
- Os Homens e as Sombras (1951)
- Vindima de Sangue (1953)
- Olhos de Água (1954)
- A Barca dos Sete Lemes (1958)
- Uma Fenda na Muralha (1959)
- Cavalo Espantado (1960)
- Barranco de Cegos (1961)
- O Muro Branco (1966)
- Os Reinegros (1972)

=== Theatre ===
- Maria Emília (1945)
- Forja (1948)
- O Destino Morreu de Repente (1967)
- Fronteira Fechada (1972)

=== Short stories ===
- Nasci com Passaporte de Turista (1940)
- Espólio (1943)
- Comboio das Seis (1946)
- Noite Esquecida (1959)
- Constantino Guardador de Vacas e de Sonhos (1962)
- Histórias Afluentes (1963)
- Três Contos de Dentes (1968)

=== Children's literature ===
- A Vida Mágica da Sementinha (1956)
- A Flor Vai Ver o Mar (1968)
- A Flor Vai Pescar Num Bote (1968)
- Uma Flor Chamada Maria (1969)
- Maria Flor Abre o Livro das Surpresas (1970)

=== Essays ===
- Glória - Uma Aldeia do Ribatejo (1938)
- A França - Da Resistência à Renascença (1949)
- Cancioneiro do Ribatejo (1950)
- Ribatejo (Em Portugal Maravilhoso) (1952)
- Romanceiro Geral do Povo Português (1959)

=== Screenplays ===
- Nazaré (1952)
- Avieiros (1975)

=== Conferences ===
- Le Roman du Tage (Edited by Union Française Universitaire - Paris) (1946)
