= Erico Verissimo =

Brazilian writer (1905–1975

Érico Lopes Veríssimo
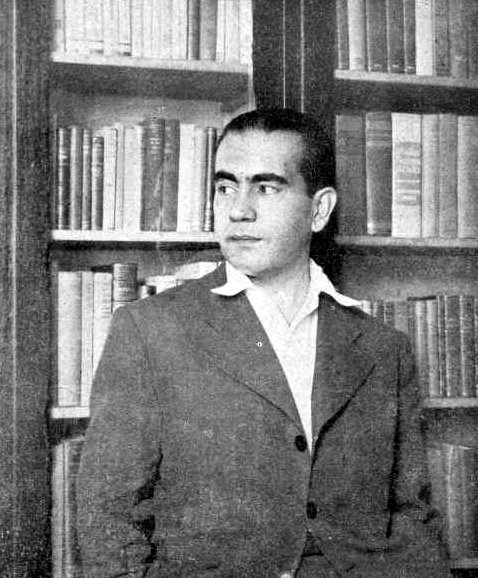
- Verissimo in 1940
- Born: December 17, 1905; Cruz Alta, Brazil
- Died: November 28, 1975 (aged 69); Porto Alegre, Brazil
- Occupations: novelist, short story writer
- Children: Luis Fernando Verissimo
- Writing career
- Period: 1933-1975
- Movement: Modernist

Érico Lopes Veríssimo (Note: Originally written Erico Lopes Verissimo.) (December 17, 1905 – November 28, 1975) was an important Brazilian writer, born in the State of Rio Grande do Sul.

== Biography ==
Érico Veríssimo was the son of Sebastião Veríssimo da Fonseca and Abegahy Lopes Veríssimo. His father, heir of a rich family in Cruz Alta, met financial ruin during his son's youth and, as a result, Erico didn't complete secondary school because of the need to work.

Veríssimo settled in Cruz Alta as the owner of a drugstore, but was unsuccessful. He then moved to Porto Alegre in 1930, willing to live solely by selling his writing. There he began to live around writers of renown, such as Mário Quintana, Augusto Meyer, Guilhermino César and others. In the following year, he was hired to occupy the position of secretary of edition of the Revista do Globo, of which he would become editor in 1933. He then undertook the whole editorial project at Editora Globo, propelling its nationwide fame.

He published his first work, Fantoches ("Puppets"), in 1932, with a sequence of short stories, mostly in the form of short plays. The following year, he saw his first great success with the romance Clarissa.

Veríssimo married in 1931 to Mafalda Volpe and had two children, Luis Fernando Verissimo, also a writer, and Clarissa.

In 1938 Veríssimo published Olhai os Lírios do Campo (Behold the Lilies of the Field) and had great success in Brazil; the novel was translated into German, French, Italian, Japanese, Indochinese, and adapted into a film by Ernesto Arancibia in Argentina in 1947 and into a soap opera by TV Globo in Brazil in 1980.

In 1943 he moved with his family to the United States, where he gave lessons on Brazilian Literature in the University of California-Berkeley, until 1945. Between 1953 and 1956 he was director of the Department of Cultural Affairs of the Organization of American States, in Washington, D.C. This period of his life was recorded in some of his books, including: Gato Preto em Campo de Neve ("Black Cat in a Snow Field"), A Volta do Gato Preto ("The Return of the Black Cat"), and História da Literatura Brasileira ("History of Brazilian Literature"), which contains some of his lectures at UCLA. His epic O Tempo e o Vento ("The Time and the Wind'") became one of the great masterpieces of the Brazilian novel, alongside Os Sertões by Euclides da Cunha, and Grande Sertão: Veredas by Guimarães Rosa.

His historical trilogy O Tempo e o Vento ("The Time and the Wind") is considered as his greatest work, written in the period of 1949–1961, from which arose primordial characters such as Ana Terra and Capitão Rodrigo that went on to become popular amongst his readers. Four of his, Time and the Wind, Night, Mexico, and His Excellency, the Ambassador, were translated into the English language by Linton Lomas Barrett.

In 1965 Veríssimo published the romance O Senhor Embaixador ("His Excellency, the Ambassador"), in which he reflected upon the deviations of Latin America.

In the romance Incidente em Antares ("Incident in Antares"), written in 1971, he traces a parallel with Brazilian politics with the use of fantasy, with the rebellion of corpses during a strike of the gravekeepers, in the fictitious city of Antares.

After suffering a heart attack around 21:15 BRT on 28 November 1975, and dying 19 days before his 70th birthday, Veríssimo was unable to complete the second volume of his autobiography entitled Solo de Clarineta ("Clarinet Solo"), which was intended to be a trilogy, apart from a romance which would be entitled A Hora do Sétimo Anjo ("The Hour of the Seventh Angel").

He was the father of another famous writer of Rio Grande do Sul, Luis Fernando Verissimo.

== Works ==
His works have been compiled on three occasions:

- Obras de Erico Verissimo ("Works of Érico Veríssimo") – 1956 (17 volumes)
- Obras completas ("Complete Works") – 1961 (10 volumes)
- Ficção completa ("Complete Fiction")– 1966 (5 volumes)

Érico Veríssimo's books have been translated to German, Spanish, Finnish, French, Dutch, Hungarian, Indonesian, English, Italian, Japanese, Norwegian, Romanian, Russian and Czech.

Short stories

- Fantoches ("Puppets")
- As mãos de meu filho ("My Son's Hands")
- O ataque ("The Attack")
- Os devaneios do general ("The reveries of the general")

Novels

- Clarissa – 1933
- Caminhos Cruzados ("Crossed Paths") – 1935
- Música ao Longe ("Music From Afar") – 1936
- Um Lugar ao Sol ("A Place in the Sun")– 1936
- Olhai os Lírios do Campo ("Behold the Lilies of the Field")– 1938
- Saga – 1940
- O Resto É Silêncio ("The Rest is Silence") – 1943
- O Tempo e o Vento (The Time and the Wind"):
  - O continente ("The Continent") – 1949
  - O Retrato ("The Portrait") – 1951
  - O Arquipélago ("The Archipelago") – 1961
- Noite ("Night") - 1954 (the versions published in Portugal contain also "A Sonata" ("The Sonata"), a short story written by a solitary music teacher, that sees himself transported to the past, to the year of his birth, where he falls in love for a beautiful woman)
- O Senhor Embaixador ("His Majesty, the Ambassador") – 1965
- O Prisoneiro ("The Prisoner") – 1967
- Incidente em Antares ("Incident in Antares") – 1971

Children's literature

- A vida de Joana d'Arc – 1935
- As Aventuras do Avião Vermelho – 1936
- Os Três Porquinhos Pobres – 1936
- Rosa Maria no Castelo Encantado – 1936
- Meu ABC – 1936
- As Aventuras de Tibicuera – 1937
- O Urso com Música na Barriga – 1938
- A Vida do Elefante Basílio – 1939
- Outra vez os três porquinhos – 1939
- Viagem à aurora do mundo – 1939
- Aventuras no mundo da higiene – 1939
- Gente e bichos – 1956

Travel literature

- Gato Preto em Campo de Neve – 1941
- A Volta do Gato Preto – 1946
- México – 1957
- Israel em Abril – 1969

Autobiographies

- O escritor diante do espelho – 1966 (in "Ficção Completa")
- Solo de Clarineta – Memórias (Volume I) – 1973
- Solo de clarineta – Memórias (Volume II) – 1976 (posthumous edition, organized by Flávio L. Chaves)

Essays

- Brazilian Literature: an Outline – 1945
- Mundo velho sem porteira – 1973
- Breve história da literatura brasileira

Biographies

- Um certo Henrique Bertaso – 1972

Translations

Novels

- The Ringer, by Edgar Wallace – 1931
- The Crimson Circle, by Edgar Wallace – 1931
- The Door with Seven Locks, by Edgar Wallace – 1931
- Jahrgang 1902, by Ernst Glaeser – 1933
- Point Counter Point, by Aldous Huxley – 1934
- Kleiner Mann, Was nun?, by Hans Fallada – 1937
- We Are Not Alone, by James Hilton – 1940
- Goodbye Mr. Chips, by James Hilton – 1940
- Of Mice and Men, by John Steinbeck – 1940
- Portrait of Jennie, by Robert Nathan – 1942
- They Shoot Horses, Don't They?, by Horace McCoy – 1947
- Then and Now, by Somerset Maugham – 1948
- The Clue of the New Pin), by Edgar Wallace – 1956

Short Stories

- Psychology, by Katherine Mansfield – 1939 (Revista do Globo)
- Bliss, by Katherine Mansfield – 1940
- Her First Ball, by Katherine Mansfield – 1940 (Revista do Globo)

== Awards ==
- Machado de Assis Prize, from Cia. Editora Nacional, in 1934, for Music from afar
- Graça Aranha Foundation Award for Crossed Paths
- Title Doctor Honoris Causa, in 1944, from Mills College, in Oakland, California, where he taught Brazilian Literature and History
- Machado de Assis Prize, in 1954, awarded by the Brazilian Academy of Letters, for his entire body of work
- Title of Citizen of Porto Alegre, in 1964, granted by the City Council of that city
- Jabuti Award - Romance Category, from the Brazilian Chamber of Books, in 1965, for the book O Senhor Ambassador
- Intellectual of the Year Award (Troféu Juca Pato), in 1968, awarded by Folha de S.Paulo and the Brazilian Union of Writers
- Additional Grand Cross of the Order of Rio Branco, granted by President Luiz Inácio Lula da Silva in 2005 (posthumous)
