= Hispania (journal) =

Spanish and Portuguese pedagogical journal

- Discipline: Education
- Language: English, Spanish, Portuguese
- Edited by: Benjamin Fraser

Publication details
- History: 1917-present
- Publisher: Johns Hopkins University Press on behalf of the American Association of Teachers of Spanish and Portuguese (United States)
- Frequency: Quarterly

Standard abbreviations
- ISO 4: Hispania

Indexing
- ISSN: 0018-2133
- LCCN: 2002-227125
- JSTOR: 00182133
- OCLC no.: 50709558

Links
- Journal homepage; Webpage at association's site

Hispania is a peer-reviewed academic journal and the official journal of the American Association of Teachers of Spanish and Portuguese. It is published quarterly by the AATSP and covers Spanish and Portuguese literature, linguistics, and pedagogy. Hispania publishes in literature, linguistics, and pedagogy having to do with Portuguese- and Spanish-speaking communities, as well as book/media reviews, which are subdivided into Pan-Hispanic/Luso-Brazilian Literary and Cultural Studies, linguistics, language, media, and fiction and film.

== History ==
The first publication of Hispania dates to the earliest days of the American Association of Teachers of Spanish and Portuguese and the first issue featured a summation of the possibilities of the new organization, written by Lawrence Wilkins, as well as an outline of future plans for the journal written by its founding editor in chief, Aurelio M. Espinosa (Stanford University). In the outline, Espinosa defined the journal's chief aim as "the betterment of the teaching of Spanish in our schools and colleges". Accordingly, Hispania's original subtitle was "A Journal Devoted to the Interests of Teachers of Spanish," which reflected the earnest pedagogic tone and content of its first volumes. In keeping with his vision of the journal's purpose, Espinosa published more pedagogical material than any of his successors: fully 64 percent of the articles in the nine volumes he edited were pedagogical in nature.

Alfred Coester succeeded Espinosa as editor, a position he held for the next 14 years. During his tenure the journal grew significantly in scope and readership, adding new sections, such as the "Professional Literature" section devoted to reviewing pedagogical articles and books. In 1941, a report of the Committee on General Policies led to a revision of Hispania's scope by recommending among others that its "contents should strike a balance between material of interest to secondary teachers and articles primarily of interest to university members". Further revisions called for more articles on Spanish in elementary schools, on relations with Hispanic America, and on attitudes of personal educators toward the teaching of Spanish and Portuguese.

Henry Grattan Doyle succeeded Coester in 1942. Doyle had been editor of the Modern Language Journal for four years before he became editor of Hispania. Doyle instituted the anonymous peer review process that is still in place today. He also increased the number of articles dealing with Luso-Brazilian languages and literatures. Other additions Doyle made to the editorial process included assigning books for review and ceasing to accept unsolicited reviews.

The post World War II era was ushered in with a new editor, Donald Walsh, in 1949. Walsh is considered by many, including his successor, Robert Mead Jr., to have developed Hispania into the modern language journal it is today. Walsh broke with the previous editors' focus on pedagogy by broadening Hispania's scope, diversifying its contents, adding new sections, soliciting contributions from colleagues known for their expertise, and making sure that every issue of the journal had something of practical use and pedagogical value to both the K-12 teacher and the graduate-level professor. Walsh also instituted the change to a two-column format, which saved the journal space and money. He retired from the editorship in 1957.

Robert Meade Jr. (University of Connecticut) became interim editor in 1958, having already served since 1953 as an associate editor. Meade reiterated the message that articles must be broad enough in scope to interest the more than 5,000 members, nearly half of whom taught in secondary schools. Meade served during a time of rapid growth within the profession due to increased interest in foreign language study as well as increased funding through the National Defense Education Act (instituted to keep pace with the former USSR in mathematics, science, and foreign languages). Meade's editorial leadership increased the number of literary articles published in order to rectify an imbalance between the various sections.

Seymour Menton (University of Kansas) succeeded Meade in 1963. During his three-year tenure as editor, Menton also strove to rectify an imbalance in the journal's article ratio by calling for more literary contributions from members. He created a second book review section that focused on reviewing books of scholarly and literary interest, as opposed to the original one, which focused on textbook reviews.

Irving P. Rothberg, who had edited the book review section for nearly nine years prior, succeeded Menton in 1966 and served until 1974. He was in turn succeeded by Donald W. Bleznick, who instituted the inclusion of an editorial policy in each number of Hispania outlining what the journal would and would not accept for publication, a move intended to reduce the number of unwanted submissions. Bleznick managed the journal during one of its most trying times, after a fire destroyed its printing facility in Appleton, Wisconsin in May 1979. He oversaw the reconstruction of the journal and found it a new publisher in time to have it in print again by 1980.

Theodore A. Sackett became editor in 1984 and directed the journal through most of the 1980s. Sackett added "Pedagogy" as a special section in Hispania in order to address the changing face of the classroom that resulted from the advent of computers and the new concern for communicative competence. He was succeeded by Estelle Irizarry in 1993. During her editorship, Hispania became the first journal in the humanities to digitalize and produce a CD of articles dating from its inception in 1917 through 1990, a project for which members volunteered to prepare issues or volumes. Irizarry also improved efficiency and reduced decision time. Under her tenure, the journal was awarded second place for the "Phoenix Award for Significant Editorial Achievement" from the Council of Editors of Learned Journals in 1995.

Janet Pérez assumed the editorship in 2000. Her final term ended in 2009. The end of her editorship coincided with her induction as a permanent member of the North American Academy of the Spanish Language at a ceremony at the Instituto Cervantes in New York City.

Sheri Spaine Long, the former editor of Foreign Language Annals, succeeded Pérez as Editor in January 2010. Concurrently, Johns Hopkins University Press became the publisher of the journal. Long's editorship ended in 2018.

Benjamin Fraser began as Editor of the journal in 2018.

== Abstracting and indexing ==
The journal is abstracted and indexed in Current Contents, EBSCOhost, FRANCIS, Hispanic American Periodicals Index, International Bibliography of Periodical Literature in the Humanities and Social Sciences, Linguistics and Language Behavior Abstracts, and Russian Academy of Sciences Bibliographies.
