= Russinho (footballer, born 1917) =

Brazilian footballer and lawyer

David Russowski, best known as Russinho, (born in Cruz Alta, Rio Grande do Sul, September 1, 1917 - died in São Paulo, São Paulo (State), September 14, 1958) was a Brazilian football (soccer) player.

He started playing for Americano, a former club of Porto Alegre, passing by Grêmio, and finally arriving in Internacional. Russinho was brought to the club by his brother, Gildo Russowski, later President of Sport Club Internacional. In 1942, Russinho prematurely ended his career to be a lawyer. He died in 1958 after a surgical procedure.

== Clubs ==
- Americano: 1935 - 1937
- Grêmio: 1937 - 1938
- Internacional: 1938 - 1942

== Honours ==
- Campeonato Gaúcho: 1940, 1941 and 1942
