= American Association of Teachers of Spanish and Portuguese =

American professional organization

- Abbreviation: AATSP
- Formation: December 29, 1917
- Type: Professional association
- Purpose: Promotion of the study and teaching of Hispanic, Luso-Brazilian, and other related languages and cultures
- Headquarters: Chesterton, Indiana
- Location: 160 Rail Road Suite 3
- Region served: United States and Canada
- Members: 10,000+
- Official language: Spanish, Portuguese, English
- Executive Director: Maria Carreira
- Affiliations: ACTFL, JNCL-NCLIS
- Website: www.aatsp.org

The American Association of Teachers of Spanish and Portuguese is a language-specific professional association in the United States that was founded on December 29, 1917, in New York City as the American Association of Teachers of Spanish. The name was changed to the present one when Portuguese was added to the association's mission in 1944.

The organization is composed of thousands of members in 60 chapters across the United States and Canada.

== Mission statement ==
The mission statement of the association is to:

promote ... the study and teaching of Hispanic, Luso-Brazilian, and other related languages, literatures, and cultures at all educational levels. Through an exchange of pedagogical and scholarly information, the AATSP encourages heritage and second-language study and supports projects to that end.

== History and organization ==
The Association was founded in 1917 largely through the efforts of Lawrence A. Wilkins, its first President, who worked with a number of individuals teaching in colleges, universities, and high schools along the Eastern Seaboard. Aurelio M. Espinosa, later the first editor of Hispania, helped Wilkins to unite the previously existing east and west coast Spanish teachers' initiatives to form the national association. The AATSP was the first association in the United States devoted to the study of a specific modern foreign language, pre-dating the AATI (1923), the AATF (French) (1927), and the AATG (German) (1927).

Membership has always been open to teachers of Spanish and Portuguese and all others interested in the languages. There are Honorary Members and Fellows who represent, respectively, the world of Hispanic and Luso-Brazilian scholarship and the world of letters.

=== Governing body ===
The governing body of AATSP is an Executive Council (EC) which consists of an executive director, a president, a president-elect, and the past president. There is an elected representative from the college or university and high school levels. In addition, there is a rotating body of elected members every three years of three members, one from a community college, one from Foreign Language in the Elementary School (FLES), and one from Portuguese.

The Executive Council meets once a year face-to-face at the annual conference, through numerous conference calls, and regularly through online meetings via email. There is a business meeting at the annual conference through which all members can express their concerns to the EC. There are also standing committees for Portuguese, FLES, award selection, scholarship selection, and nominations.

== Services ==
=== Annual conference ===
An annual conference has been held each year since 1917 with the exception of two years during World War II when government restrictions prohibited such gatherings. Each annual conference consists of a wide range of sessions, numerous workshops for members, and many social activities designed to augment the camaraderie of members. In the 21st century, meetings have been held in Albuquerque. San José, Costa Rica; San Diego; Salamanca, Spain; New York City; Chicago; Rio de Janeiro; Guadalajara, Mexico and Orlando, Florida.

=== Career center ===
The AATSP offers employment opportunity information to its members by way of an online career center. This interactive tool allows job seekers to search for jobs based on their personal criteria and allows employers from school districts, colleges, and universities to announce job openings.

=== Publications ===
Hispania is the official journal of the AATSP. From its inception, it was envisioned as a scholarly publication and also as a source of practical advice for classroom teachers. It features articles on literature, language, theoretical and applied linguistics, cultural studies, and book and media reviews. It has steadily grown in prestige and has had 12 editors through the years; the present editor is Dr. Sheri Spaine Long of University of Alabama at Birmingham. Publications are in March, June, September, and December. Hispania is a member of the Council of Editors of Learned Journals.

Enlace is the AATSP's online newsletter that contains timely articles of interest to members. The Portuguese Newsletter features items of interest about the Luso-Brazilian world. They are both published in the spring and fall.

Albricias is published by The Sociedad Honoraria Hispánica (SHH) and contains essays, poetry, and short articles as well as photography and artwork created by student members of the SHH. Albricias is distributed in print to student contributors and their chapter sponsors and is permanently archived in electronic form on the AATSP website. Cash awards are presented to award-winning student contributions to the journal.

Revista Luso-Hispánica (RLH) . Filling the gap between the AATSP’s two other student publications - Albricias, for high school students, and the Spanish and Portuguese Review (SPR), for graduate students – RLH’s mission is to promote and recognize scholarship and artistic expression by undergraduate students of Spanish and Portuguese. Accordingly, the journal’s scope of publication includes academic papers, interviews, and book reviews related to the study or teaching of Hispanic and Luso-Brazilian languages and cultures, as well as creative works of writing, such as poems, short stories, and other works of fiction.

=== Scholarships and awards ===
There are three categories of scholarships AATSP offers. The first is a "First-Time-Attendee" travel stipend for the annual conference. There are ten $500 stipends offered which are distributed to faculty members and to graduate students. Applicants must be a member of AATSP at the time of application, a teacher of Spanish and/or Portuguese K-16, and a first time attendee at an AATSP annual meeting.

There are also scholarships for study abroad programs in Costa Rica, Mexico, and the Andean countries of Bolivia, Ecuador, and Peru. The study abroad programs provide scholarships and the AATSP supplements the scholarship with a $750 travel stipend. Applicants must be an AATSP member for three consecutive years, a full-time Spanish teacher for three years, and continue to teach Spanish for an academic year following the scholarship experience.

The Robert G. Mead, Jr. Travel and Study/Research Stipend is a $1,000.00 travel stipend made possible through the contributions of friends of Professor Mead and his widow Harriet. Applicants must travel and conduct research in a Luso-Hispanic country and be a student member of AATSP for two years or a regular member for three years.

The AATSP accepts nominations from its members for individuals who have done outstanding work in the promotion of foreign language education in Spanish and Portuguese. Awards include Outstanding Teacher of the Year, Outstanding Service, Chapter Incentive, Robert G. Mead, Jr. Distinguished Leadership, Maria Isabel Abreu, and ISE Language Matters.

== Student involvement ==
=== FLES poster contest ===
Each year the AATSP sponsors a poster contest for all students enrolled in Spanish or Portuguese in grades Pre-K-8 of AATSP members in good standing. It is an opportunity to discuss language learning with younger learners. The contest is a classroom activity and program advocacy tool providing student recognition.

=== Honor Societies ===
The Sociedad Honoraria Hispánica (SHH) was established in 1952 as a service-oriented honors society for select students of Spanish. It has long published an official newsletter for its sponsors, ¡Albricias!, which includes poetry, short pieces, illustrations, and photography created by the students themselves. There are more than 1800 chapters and the number of initiates grows each year. A club for elementary and middle school students, the Sociedad Hispánica de Amistad (SHA), was formed in 2001. Kelly Scheetz directs the SHH and Beth Gaunce directs the SHA.

=== National Examinations ===
The National Spanish Examinations (NSE) are web-based, standardized assessment tools for Grades 6–-12, given voluntarily by over 3400 teachers throughout the United States to measure proficiency and achievement of students who are studying Spanish as a second language.

The National Portuguese Examinations (NPE) are communicative proficiency-based tools that engage the students in reading, speaking, and writing. They are intended for High School students of Portuguese.

== See also ==
- Hispania
- Language education
- National Spanish Examinations
- Instituto Cervantes
- Hispanism
- Hispanist
