= Luis Fernando Verissimo =

Brazilian writer (1936–2025)

Luís Fernando Verissimo
- Verissimo in 2003
- Born: September 26, 1936; Porto Alegre, Rio Grande do Sul, Brazil
- Died: August 30, 2025 (aged 88); Porto Alegre, Rio Grande do Sul, Brazil
- Writing career
- Genre: Humor

Luís Fernando Verissimo (September 26, 1936 – August 30, 2025) was a Brazilian writer. Verissimo was the son of Brazilian writer Érico Verissimo and lived with his father in the United States during his childhood. Best known for his crônicas and texts of humor, more precisely satire of manners, published daily in several Brazilian newspapers, Verissimo was also a cartoonist, translator, and television writer, playwright and novelist. He has also been advertising and newspaper copy desk. He was also a musician, having played saxophone in a few sets. With over 60 published titles, he was one of the most popular contemporary Brazilian writers.

== Background ==
Verissimo was a great fan of jazz, and played saxophone since 1995 in a band called Jazz 6, "the smallest sextet in the world", with five members.

Verissimo was fond of football, and a famous Sport Club Internacional supporter. He wrote widely about football throughout his work.

Verissimo married Lúcia Helena Massa in 1964, and the couple had three children: Fernanda, journalist, Mariana, writer, and Pedro, musician. He lived with his wife in Porto Alegre.

Born on September 26, 1936, and raised in Porto Alegre, Luis Fernando lived most of his childhood and adolescence in the United States with his family, due to professional commitments undertaken by his father – a professor at UC Berkeley (1943–1945) and cultural director at the Organization of American States in Washington (1953–1956). As a result, he attended primary part of San Francisco and Los Angeles, and completed high school at Roosevelt High School in Washington.

At 14, he produced with his sister, Clarissa, a periodical paper about his family hung in their bathroom; the work was called The Patentino ("patente" is the way toilets are known in Rio Grande do Sul).

When he lived in Washington, Verissimo developed his passion for jazz, studied saxophone and took frequent trips to New York, attending performances of the greatest musicians of the era, including Charlie Parker and Dizzy Gillespie.

Verissimo died on August 30, 2025, at the age of 88.

== Early works ==
Back in Porto Alegre in 1956, he began working in the art department of Editora Globo. Since 1960, he joined the musical group Renato and His Sextet, which featured dances professionally in the state capital, and with nine members it was known as "the biggest sextet in the world".

Between 1962 and 1966, lived in Rio de Janeiro, where he worked as a translator and copywriter, and where he met and married (1963) Lucia Helena Massa, his lifelong partner and mother of his three children (Fernanda, 1964, Mariana, 1967, and Pedro, 1970).

In 1967, again in his hometown, he began working in the newspaper Zero Hora, first as a copy editor (copy desk). In 1969, after covering the holidays of columnist Sergio Jockymann and to showcase the quality and speed of the text, he went on to sign his own daily column in the newspaper. His first columns were about football, addressing the foundation of the Beira-Rio stadium and the games of SC Internacional, his club. The same year he became editor of the advertising agency MPM Propaganda.

In 1970 he moved to the newspaper Folha da Manhã, where he held his daily column until 1975, writing about sport, cinema, literature, music, food, politics and behavior, always with irony and personal ideas, and short stories of humor which illustrated their views.

In 1971 he created the alternative weekly O Pato Macho with a group of friends in the press and publicity in Porto Alegre, with humorous texts, cartoons, stories and interviews, which circulated throughout the year in the city.

From 1975 to 1999 he drew the newspaper comic strip As Cobras [The Snakes], and from 1988 to 2017 the newspaper cartoon series Família Brasil.

== Fame in Brazil and the gaucho culture of southern Brazil ==
In 1981, the book "O Analista de Bagé", launched at the Book Fair of Porto Alegre, sold out its first edition in two days, becoming a bestseller around the country. The character, created (but unused) for a television comedy program with Jô Soares, was an orthodox Freudian psychoanalyst, but with the accent, the language and customs typical of the border of Rio Grande do Sul, Uruguay and Argentina. The contradiction between the sophistication of psychoanalysis and the "rough" caricature of the gaucho of the border generated very funny situations, which Verissimo was able to explore with his talent in two books of short stories, a comic book (with drawings by Edgar Vasques) and an anthology.

In 1982 Verissimo began to publish a weekly page of humor in the magazine Veja, which would keep until 1989.

In 1983, the tenth volume of unpublished chronicles, has launched a new character that would also make great success, A Velhinha de Taubaté (The Old Lady of Taubaté), defined as "the only person who still believes in government." The naive character, who gave to his pet cat the name of the spokesman for President-General Figueiredo, marked the decline of the Brazilian military government, which was almost completed 20 years. But years later, in a democracy, Verissimo would revive the Old Lady of Taubaté, mocking the credibility of civilian presidents, especially Fernando Collor and Fernando Henrique Cardoso.

Throughout the 1980s, Verissimo has established itself as a phenomenon of popularity rare among Brazilian writers, keeping weekly columns in several newspapers and throwing at least one book a year, always on the bestseller lists, and writing sitcoms for TV Globo.

In 1986, he lived six months with his family in Rome, and covered the World Cup for Playboy magazine. In 1988, contracted by MPM Propaganda, he wrote his first novel, O Jardim do Diabo (The Devil's Garden).

== New directions ==
In 1999, Verissimo quit drawing As Cobras comic strips and changed publishers, switching from L&PM to Objetiva, which began republishing all his work. One of these anthologies, "As Mentiras que os Homens Contam" (The Lies that Men Tell) (2000), has sold over 350,000 copies.

In 2003, he decided to reduce his workload in the press, from six to just two columns a week, now published in Zero Hora, O Globo and O Estado de São Paulo.

From requests generated by publishers, Verissimo ceased to be the "great writer of short texts" and added to his oeuvre a series of novels and romances: "Gula - O Clube dos Anjos" (The Club of Angels) for the collection "Plenos Pecados" (Complete Sins) of Objetiva (1998), "Borges e os Orangotangos Eternos (Borges and the Eternal Orangutans)" (2000) for the collection "Literatura ou Morte" (Literature or Death) of Companhia das Letras, "O Opositor" (2004) for the collection "Cinco Dedos de Prosa" (Five Fingers of Prose) of Objetiva, "A Décima Segunda Noite" (The Twelfth Night) (2006) for the collection "Devorando Shakespeare" (Devouring Shakespeare), and even "Sport Club Internacional, Autobiografia de uma Paixão" (Autobiography of a Passion) (2004), for the collection "Camisa 13" of Ediouro.

In 2003, a cover story in Veja highlighted Verissimo as "the writer that sells the most books in Brazil." At the same time, the English version of "O Clube dos Anjos" ("The Club of Angels") was chosen by the New York Public Library as one of the 25 best books of the year. In 2004, in France, he received the Prix Deux Oceans Latin Culture Festival of Biarritz.

In 2006, Verissimo reached 70 years of age established as one of the greatest contemporary Brazilian writers, having sold a total of more than 5 million copies of his books. In 2008, his daughter Fernanda gave birth to his first granddaughter, Lucinda, who was born on the anniversary of the Sport Club Internacional, April 4.

A recent news piece reports that, in his life, the author has sold over 5.6 million books.

== Death ==
The artist died in Porto Alegre, Rio Grande do Sul at 0:40 BRT on August 30, 2025, around 27 days before his 89th birthday. Veríssimo had been hospitalized in the intensive care unit of Hospital Moinhos de Vento for about three weeks with pneumonia. He also had Parkinson’s disease and heart problems, having received a pacemaker in 2016. In 2021, he suffered a stroke, which left him with motor and communication difficulties.

== Literary works ==
=== Short stories ===
- A Grande Mulher Nua
- Amor brasileiro
- Aquele Estranho Dia que Nunca Chega
- A Mãe de Freud
- A Mesa Voadora
- A Mulher do Silva
- As Cobras em Se Deus existe que eu seja atingido por um raio"
- As Aventuras da Família Brasil, Parte II
- Novas Comédias da Vida Privada
- Peças Íntimas
- Separatismo; Corta Essa!
- Sexo na Cabeça
- Todas as comédias
- Zoeira
- A eterna privação do zagueiro absoluto
- Comédias para se ler na escola
- As mentiras que os homens contam
- Histórias brasileiras de verão
- Aquele estranho dia que nunca chega
- Banquete com os Deuses
- Novas Comédias para se ler na escola

==== A velhinha de Taubaté ====
- A versão dos afogados – Novas comédias da vida pública
  - Comédias da Vida Privada
  - Comédias da Vida Pública

==== Analista de Bagé ====
- Quadrinhos
- O Marido do Dr. Pompeu
- O Popular
- O Rei do Rock
- Orgias
- O Suicida e o Computador
- Outras do Analista de Bagé

==== Ed Mort ====
- O seqüestro o zagueiro central
- Com a Mão no Milhão
- Outras Histórias
- Procurando o Silva
- Disney World Blues

=== Novels ===
- Borges e os Orangotangos Eternos
- Gula – O Clube dos Anjos
- O Jardim do Diabo
- O opositor
- Os espiões

=== Poetry ===
- Poesia numa hora dessas?!
