= Cruz Alta, Rio Grande do Sul =

Municipality of Rio Grande do Sul, Brazil

Cruz Alta
- Municipality
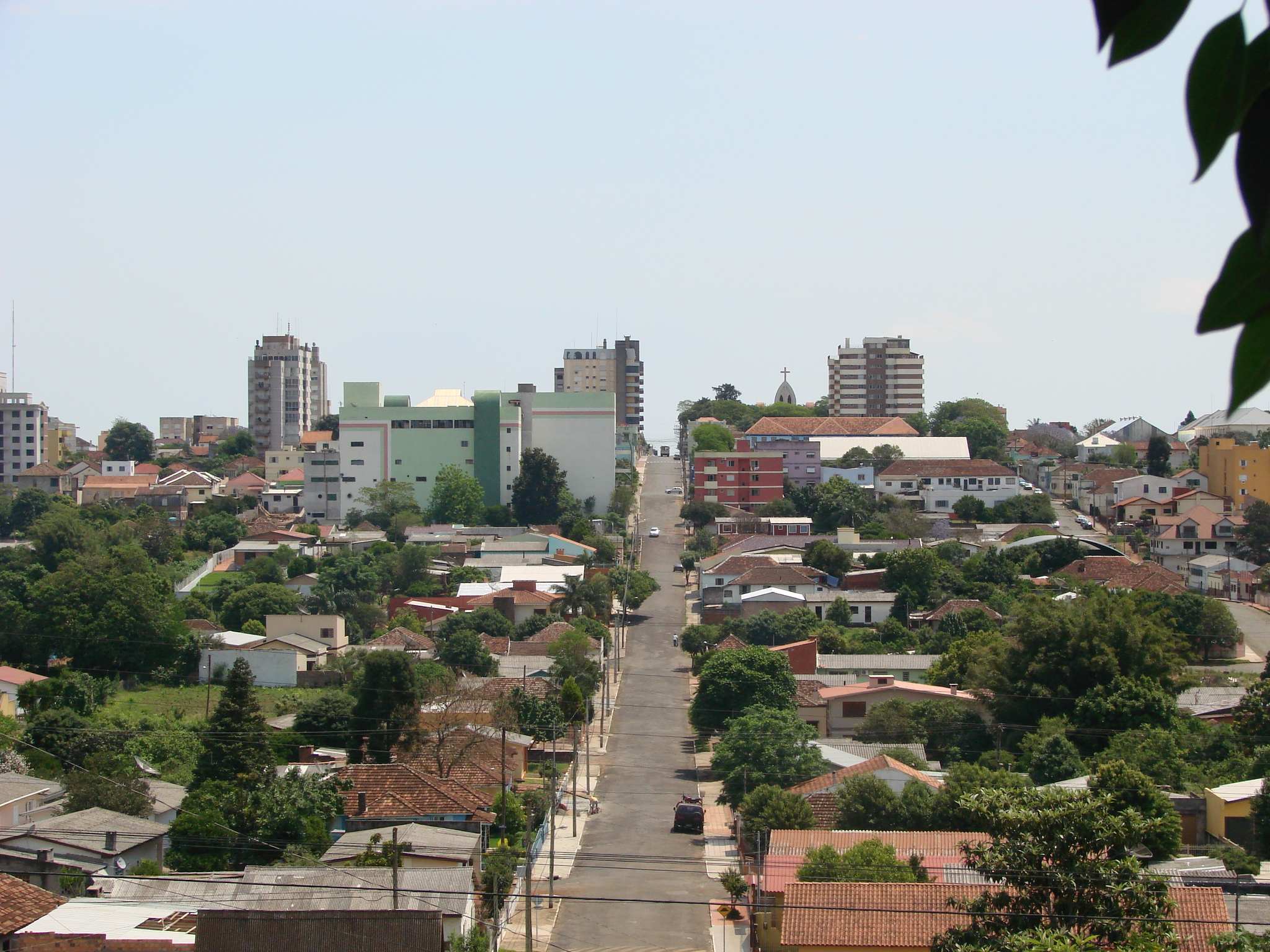
- Vista da Rua Coronel Pillar (Monumento de Fátima).

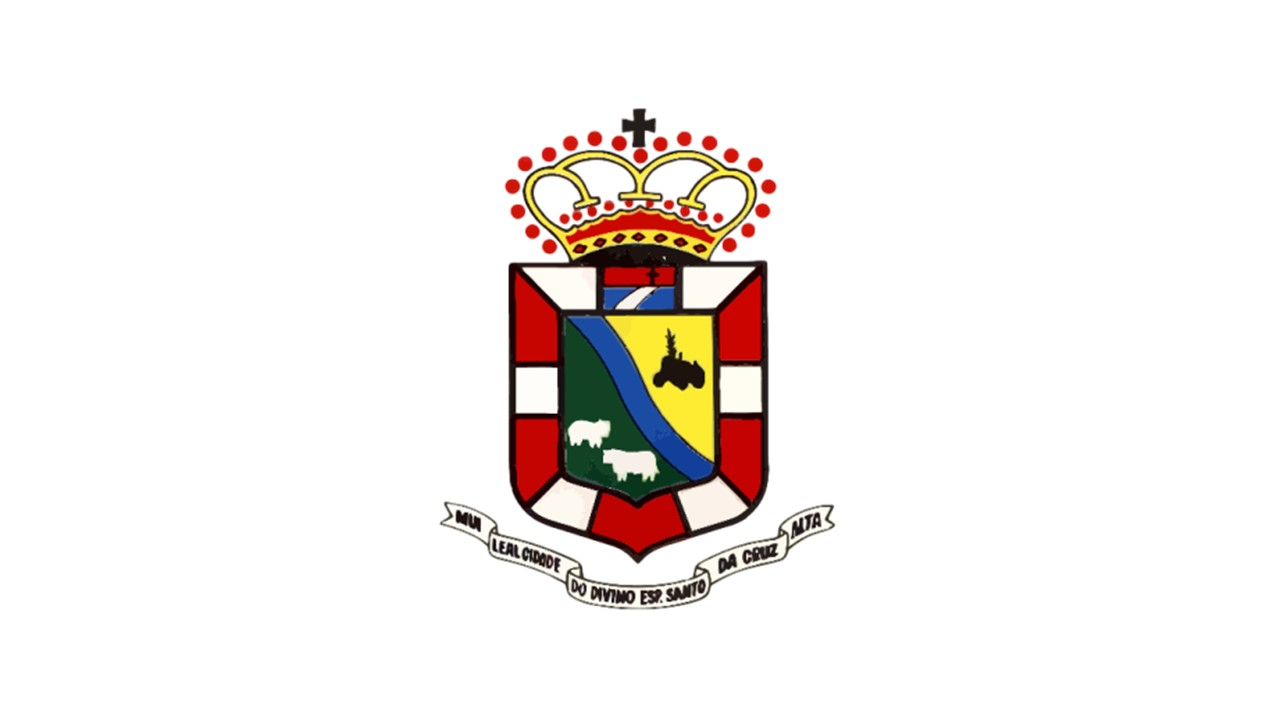
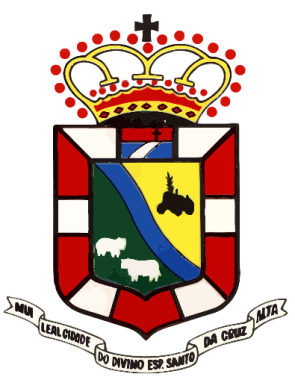
- Flag Coat of arms
- Motto: Mui Leal Cidade do Divino Espírito Santo da Cruz Alta (Very Loyal City of the Divine Holy Spirit of Cruz Alta)

- Location in Brazil
- Coordinates: 28°38′19″S 53°36′23″W
- Country: Brazil
- State: Rio Grande do Sul
- Mesoregion: Mesorregião do Noroeste Rio-Grandense
- Microregion: Microrregião de Cruz Alta
- Founded: August 18, 1821

Government
  - Mayor: Paula Rubin Facco Librelotto (PMDB)

Area
  - Total: 1,360.37 km^{2} (525.24 sq mi)
- Elevation: 452 m (1,483 ft)

Population (2020)
  - Total: 59,922
  - Density: 44.048/km^{2} (114.08/sq mi)
- Demonym: cruz-altense or cruz-altino
- Time zone: UTC−3 (BRT)
- Postal Code: 98005-970
- Area code: +55 55
- Website: http://www.cruzalta.rs.gov.br/

Cruz Alta is a municipality in the state of Rio Grande do Sul, Brazil. The town is the seat of the Roman Catholic Diocese of Cruz Alta. Was founded on August 18, 1821.

The municipality is known to have given rise to many other municipalities as Ijuí, Santa Maria, Passo Fundo, Santo Angelo and their initial territory led to more other, became known by the northwestern mother. The municipality belongs to the Northwest Mesoregion Riograndense and Microregion Cruz Alta. It is located at latitude 28 º 38 '19 "south and longitude 53 º 36' 23" west, with an average elevation of 452 meters above sea level. Access to the city is by BR-158, in the north-south axis, the BR-377 to the east, and also by the RS-342 on the west.

The location of the city is logistically important, being considered as a major trunk road and rail in the north central part of the state, with the presence of a dry port in the northeast of the city.

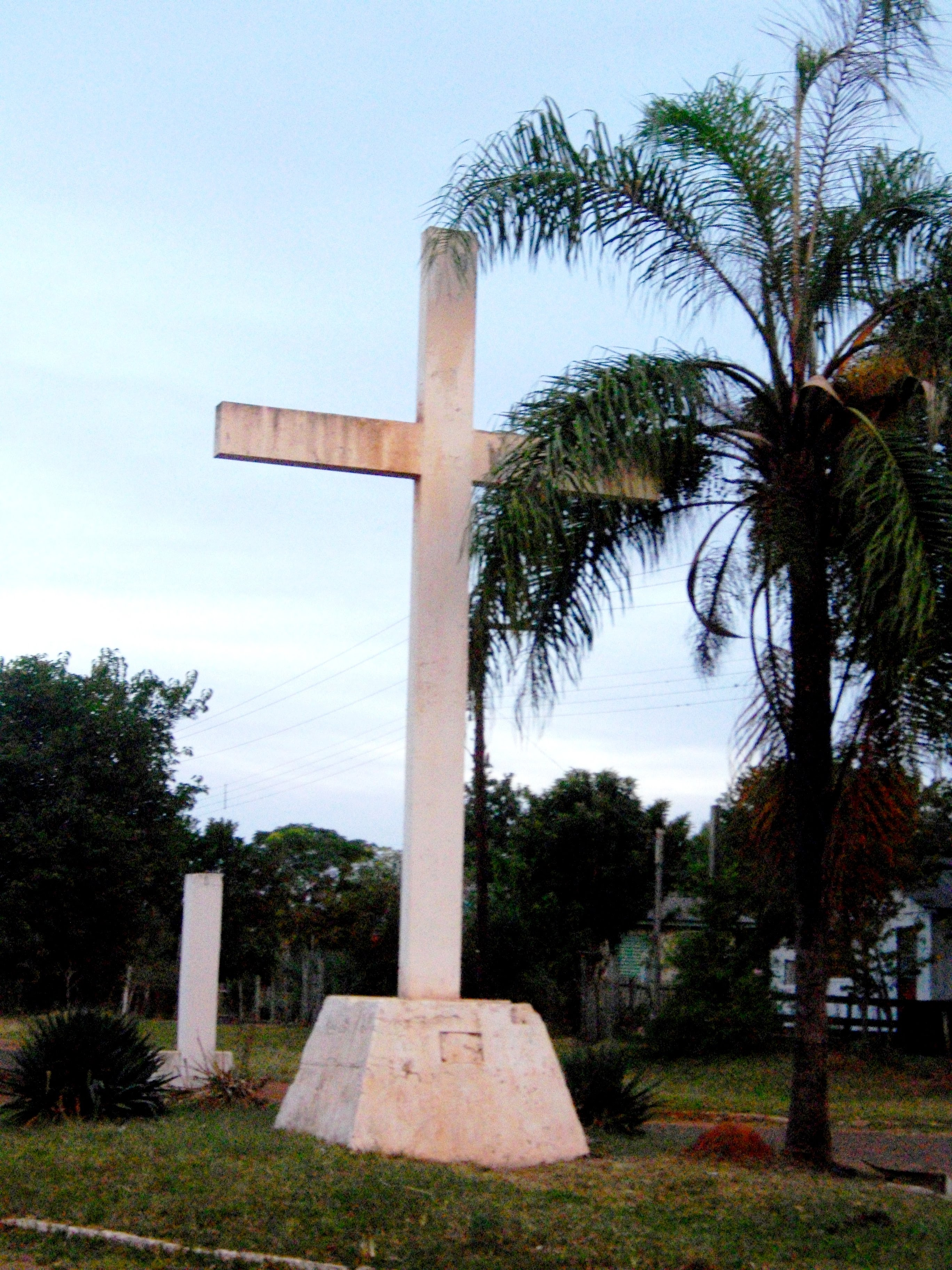
The cross Foundation allusive Town

== Geography ==
=== Climate ===
Cruz Alta experiences a humid subtropical climate (Köppen: Cfa) with hot summers, mild winters, and ample rainfall throughout the year.

Climate data for Cruz Alta (1991–2020)
Month	Jan	Feb	Mar	Apr	May	Jun	Jul	Aug	Sep	Oct	Nov	Dec	Year
Mean daily maximum °C (°F)	30.0 (86.0)	29.2 (84.6)	28.2 (82.8)	25.7 (78.3)	21.7 (71.1)	19.4 (66.9)	18.7 (65.7)	21.4 (70.5)	22.5 (72.5)	25.4 (77.7)	28.1 (82.6)	29.7 (85.5)	25.0 (77.0)
Daily mean °C (°F)	23.7 (74.7)	23.0 (73.4)	21.8 (71.2)	19.2 (66.6)	15.7 (60.3)	13.8 (56.8)	13.0 (55.4)	15.0 (59.0)	16.3 (61.3)	19.1 (66.4)	21.4 (70.5)	23.3 (73.9)	18.8 (65.8)
Mean daily minimum °C (°F)	18.8 (65.8)	18.5 (65.3)	17.3 (63.1)	14.7 (58.5)	11.8 (53.2)	10.0 (50.0)	9.0 (48.2)	10.5 (50.9)	11.7 (53.1)	14.3 (57.7)	15.9 (60.6)	18.0 (64.4)	14.2 (57.6)
Average precipitation mm (inches)	154.6 (6.09)	148.7 (5.85)	138.2 (5.44)	154.9 (6.10)	148.8 (5.86)	159.5 (6.28)	157.7 (6.21)	125.4 (4.94)	162.5 (6.40)	245.9 (9.68)	156.6 (6.17)	179.5 (7.07)	1,932.3 (76.07)
Average precipitation days (≥ 1.0 mm)	10.1	8.8	8.5	8.1	7.3	8.9	9.1	7.9	9.2	11.0	8.0	9.4	106.3
Average dew point °C (°F)	20.1 (68.2)	20.0 (68.0)	18.9 (66.0)	16.3 (61.3)	13.2 (55.8)	11.7 (53.1)	10.6 (51.1)	11.9 (53.4)	13.1 (55.6)	15.6 (60.1)	16.6 (61.9)	18.7 (65.7)	15.6 (60.1)
Mean monthly sunshine hours	251.6	217.2	228.0	197.9	172.8	140.5	157.6	187.0	177.1	200.4	239.3	252.0	2,421.4
Source: NOAA

== Notable people ==
It is the birthplace of writer Érico Veríssimo, journalist and politician Júlio de Castilhos, footballer Russinho and model and television presenter Luize Altenhofen.

== See also ==
- List of municipalities in Rio Grande do Sul
