= Treaty of Madrid =

Treaty of Madrid may refer to:

- Treaty of Madrid (1339), collaboration between Aragon and Castile
- Treaty of Madrid (1526), in which France renounced its claims in Italy, surrendered Burgundy to Charles V, Holy Roman Emperor, and abandoned sovereignty over Flanders and Artois
- Treaty of Madrid (1617), between the Holy Roman Empire and the Republic of Venice ending the Uskok War
- Treaty of Madrid (1621), in which Valtelline was restored to the Bund and Protestants in the region were given religious freedoms
- Treaty of Madrid (1630), in which England renounced supporting the rebels of the Spanish Netherlands and the Protestants in Germany
- Treaty of Madrid (1667) or Lord Sandwich's Treaty, the first step in officially ending the Anglo-Spanish War (1654–1660)
- Treaty of Madrid (1670), in which Spain recognized English possessions in the Caribbean Sea
- Treaty of Madrid (13 January 1750), which settled boundaries between Spain and Portugal's colonies in South America
- Treaty of Madrid (5 October 1750), between Spain and Britain about the Asiento de Negros
- Pinckney's Treaty or Treaty of Madrid (1795), which settled boundaries between the United States and Spain
- Treaty of Madrid (1801), in which Portugal gave France an indemnity of 20 million francs and half of Guiana
- Treaty of Madrid (1814), between Britain and Spain, following the restoration of the Bourbon Monarchy
- Treaty of Madrid (1817), act of sale of a Russian naval squadron to Spain
- Treaty of Madrid (1880), between the Sultan of Morocco and other Powers
- Treaty of Madrid (1891), giving France legal protection of the term "champagne"

== See also ==
- Madrid Accords (1975), between Spain, Morocco, and Mauritania
- Treaty of El Pardo (disambiguation), several treaties signed at the El Pardo Palace in Madrid, which might be referred to as Treaty of Madrid
