= 1969 Nobel Peace Prize =

Award

- International Labour Organization (ILO)
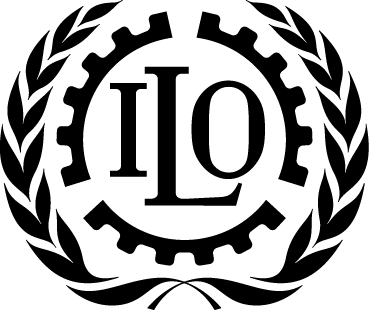
- "for creating international legislation insuring certain norms for working conditions in every country."
- Date: 22 October 1969 (announcement); 10 December 1969 (ceremony)
- Location: Oslo, Norway
- Presented by: Norwegian Nobel Committee
- First award: 1901
- Website: Official website

The 1969 Nobel Peace Prize was awarded to the United Nations agency International Labour Organization (founded in 1919) "for creating international legislation insuring certain norms for working conditions in every country." The agency became the ninth organization awarded with a Nobel Prize.

== Laureate ==
Formed in 1919 under the League of Nations and right after the Treaty of Versailles, the International Labour Organization is the first and oldest specialised agency of the United Nations. It was established with main object of the establishing principles to improve the working conditions and social rights of employees. In 1969, the organization adopted 128 conventions drawn up by representatives of national authorities, employers and employees from its member countries. While a major contributor to international labour law, they also protect freedom of association and the effective recognition of the right to collective bargaining, the elimination of forced or compulsory labour, the abolition of child labour, and the elimination of discrimination in respect of employment and occupation. The Norwegian Nobel Committee believed that such reforms strengthen the cause of peace and reduce social injustice.

== Deliberations ==
=== Nominations ===
The International Labour Organization (ILO) first received a singular nomination in 1949. In 1969, the said group earned thirteen nominations – the most nominated – which led to it being awarded the peace prize.

In 1969, the Norwegian Nobel Committee received 75 nominations for 35 individuals and 10 organizations such as Ernst Bloch, John Collins, Danilo Dolci, Cyrus S. Eaton, the Universal Esperanto Association (UEA), the Pugwash Conferences (awarded in 1995) and the Islands of Peace. Eighteen of the nominees were newly recommended such as Giorgio La Pira, John D. Rockefeller III, Alexander Dubček, Noam Chomsky, Athenagoras I of Constantinople, Jayaprakash Narayan and the people of Czechoslovakia. The Japanese educator Kaoru Hatoyama was the only female nominee while the Indian author Jogesh Chandra Bhattacharya, who died in 1960, was posthumously nominated. Notable figures like Josef Beran, Heloise Brainerd, Fred Hampton, Emrys Hughes, Zakir Husain, C. W. W. Kannangara and Jeff Sharlet died in 1969 without having been nominated for the peace prize.

Official list of nominees and their nominators for the prize
No.	Nominee	Country/ Headquarters	Motivations	Nominator(s)
Individuals
1	Athenagoras I of Constantinople (1886–1972)	Turkey	"for his work to bring together and harmonize the different churches in a spirit of true Christianity."	André Mercier (1913–1999); Swiss professors and politicians
2	André Beauguitte (1901–1986)	France	No motivation included.	5 members of the French National Assembly
3	Jogesh Chandra Bhattacharya (c. 1895–1960)	India	"for his dedication to the propagation of spiritualism through which alone, he believes, peace will dawn on earth and for his groundbreaking book Prayers for a New Advent in the field of propagation of the ideals of peace."	Jugal Kishore Mundal (?)
4	Vinoba Bhave (1895–1982)	India	No motivation included.	Rizak Ram Dahiya (1912–?)
5	Charles K. Bliss (1897–1985)	Soviet Union (Ukraine; Austria	No motivation included.	Doug Everingham (1923–2017)
6	Ernst Bloch (1885–1977)	Germany	No motivation included.	Michael Landmann (1913–1984)
7	Norman Borlaug (1914–2009)	United States	"because of the great impact his research on wheat has had in the field of food distribution in developing countries, wherein such an improvement on the social and economic circumstances of people in the poor part of the world is an important contribution to the creation of a stabile international environment."	Ola Ullsten (1931–2018)
7	Norman Borlaug (1914–2009)	United States	"for his outstanding efforts in relation to the distribution of wheat, and the importance his work has had for the struggle against famine in the world."	Ellen Strange Petersen (1913–1984); Mads Eg Damgaard (1913–1999)
8	Fenner Brockway (1888–1988)	United Kingdom	"for throughout his entire life having worked unremittingly for peace, for freedom and for human well-being."	Ritchie Calder (1906–1982)
8	Fenner Brockway (1888–1988)	United Kingdom	No motivation included.	Stan Newens (1920–2021)
9	Frederick Burdick (?)(prob. Eugene Burdick (1918–1965))	United States	"for having helped prevent war between Russia and the United States during the Cuban crisis, in addition to helping end the Korean War and the Second World War."	George Brown Jr. (1920–1999)
9	Frederick Burdick (?)(prob. Eugene Burdick (1918–1965))	United States	No motivation included.	Philip J. Philbin (1898–1972)
10	Brock Chisholm (1896–1971)	Canada	No motivation included.	Doug Everingham (1923–2017)
11	Noam Chomsky (born 1928)	United States	"for his great practical and theoretical contribution to the American peace movement, and hence to the cause of world peace."	Harry McFarland Bracken (1926–2011)
12	John Collins (1910–1988)	United Kingdom	No motivation included.	Sven Nyman (1910–1988)
13	Danilo Dolci (1924–1997)	Italy	"for his continuous work helping the desperately poor in western Sicily and his considerable success in leading them in nonviolent ways."	Bronson P. Clark (1918–2004)
13	Danilo Dolci (1924–1997)	Italy	"for the social and peace-promoting work to which he has dedicated his life."	35 members of the Swedish Parliament
13	Danilo Dolci (1924–1997)	Italy	"for his peace-making activities, especially his plan for reconstruction and reorganization after the enormous disaster caused by an earthquake in Sicily."	Ulrich Herz (?)
14	Alexander Dubček (1921–1992)	Czechoslovakia	"for the vital contributions he has made to the interest of enduring peace, wherein he has never lost sight of the ultimate goal of trying to bring about an effective formula for total disarmament among the great powers with an accepted system of mutual inspection."	Dominique Pire, O.P. (1910–1969)
15	Cyrus S. Eaton (1883–1979)	Canada; United States	"for his contributions to aid African Americans in achieving their entry into the mainstream of American political and economic life, his prolonged effort for friendship and understanding between the capitalist and the communist worlds, and his significant contributions toward peace between labour and industrial management in his country."	Louis Stokes (1925–2015)
16	Raoul Follereau (1903–1977)	France	"for his work to give people suffering from leprosy a place in society and human dignity."	Jean-Bédel Bokassa (1921–1996)
17	William Chapman Foster (1897–1984)	United States	"for his most praiseworthy endeavor towards and recognition of the need of peace for all mankind, wherein has worked with dignity and dedication to try to bring about a slowing-down of the arms race."	Karl Mundt (1900–1974)
17	William Chapman Foster (1897–1984)	United States	"for his work in connection with bringing to fruition the Nuclear Test Ban Treaty, and all that he has contributed to the cause of peace since he was made Director of the United States Arms Control and Disarmament Agency."	Claiborne Pell (1918–2009)
17	William Chapman Foster (1897–1984)	United States	No motivation included.	Mike Mansfield (1903–2001)
18	Alfonso García Robles (1911–1991)	Mexico	"for his years of international activity tending to the progress of law and the strengthening of peace, wherein his leadership has been a decisive factor in the work that culminated with the Treaty of Tlatelolco, which prohibits nuclear arms in Latin America."	Antonio Carrillo Flores (1909–1986)
19	Kaoru Hatoyama (1888–1982)	Japan	"for her contribution to the reopening of diplomatic relations between Japan and the U.S.S.R., and Japan's entry into the United Nations, and for her contribution to the Yuai ("Fraternity") Movement and for her achievements as an educator."	members of the Japanese Government and Parliament
20	Marc Joux (?)	France	"for his continuing work in defence of peace, by his travels, studies, and writings."	Auguste Billiemaz (1903–1983)
21	Spurgeon Milton Keeny (1893–1988)	United States	"for having, throughout his life, strived for freedom of the individual and full development of human beings as persons and for continuously striving for human betterment, for the dignity of the individual and for the coming together of all people."	Hi Sup Chung (?)
21	Spurgeon Milton Keeny (1893–1988)	United States	"the efficiency and commitment with which assistance programs and international aid were managed in Italy, wherein the effectiveness and validity of the aids but also the style and discretion that created a climate of mutual understanding, a fundamental climate for good relations between peoples, was largely due to his enlightened leadership of the UNRRA and IRO."	Ugo La Malfa (1903–1979)
21	Spurgeon Milton Keeny (1893–1988)	United States	"for his exceptional service to humanity and his devotion to relieving the misery of the less fortunate and to promoting good will among all people, where his work with population stabilization and family planning in developing countries is of special significance."	Tao-Chiuh Hsu (1917–2003)
22	Giorgio La Pira (1904–1977)	Italy	"for his work as a scholar and teacher, and as an indefatigable promoter of initiatives in favor of peace in the world."	Giacomo Devoto (1897–1974)
23	Frank Laubach (1884–1970)	United States	"for his work for world peace and understanding."	Ralph Ancil Wooster (1928–2018)
24	René Maheu (1905–1975)	France	"[with UNESCO] for their work for peace by education and the promotion of human culture in the world."	Léopold Sédar Senghor (1906–2001)
25	Harry Willis Miller (1879–1977)	United States	"for his work to build the foundations for world peace."	Huston Smith (1919–2016)
26	Jayaprakash Narayan (1902–1979)	India	No motivation included.	Rizak Ram Dahiya (1912–?)
27	George Radwanski (1947–2014)	Canada	"for his literary work which has opened the prospect of a new and realizable level of international harmony above all racial, national, and ideological boundaries."	Miloš Mladenović (1903–1984)
28	Kathiresu Ramachandra (1895–1976)	Sri Lanka	"for his substantial contribution to the advancement of world peace by the propagation of his ideas."	Shirley Corea (1906–1974)
28	Kathiresu Ramachandra (1895–1976)	Sri Lanka	"for his selfless and devoted work towards the idea of racial harmony and national unity, and his quest for peace on a global dimension."	M. D. H. Jayawardena (1915–1986)
28	Kathiresu Ramachandra (1895–1976)	Sri Lanka	"for having dedicated his life to the cause of peace, wherein his peace mission promotes inter-communal, inter-racial harmony on the local levels, inter-religious harmony and international understanding and peace."	A. P. Jayasuriya (1901–1980)
29	John D. Rockefeller III (1906–1978)	United States	"for, throughout his life, having attempted to contribute to peace and the well-being of mankind without regard to race, religion, ideological differences, diversity of national origin or cultural background."	Dean Rusk (1909–1994)
30	Joaquín Sanz Gadea (1930–2019)	Spain	"for his grand social and humane mission for peace in Kisangani."	Luis Sánchez Granjel (1920–2014)
31	Friedrich Siegmund-Schultze (1885–1969)	Germany	"for having devoted a great period of his long life to understanding, undertaking a wide range of peace activities and many of his initiatives show a true pioneering quality."	William Edward Barton (1868–1955)
31	Friedrich Siegmund-Schultze (1885–1969)	Germany	"for his scholarship and religious activity, but also his undeviating devotion through tragic times to world peace and international understanding."	Reginald William Sorensen (1891–1971)
32	Alfred Verdroß-Droßberg (1890–1980)	Austria	"for having, theoretically and practically, in Austria and in the whole world, worked towards peace and its institutional realization."	Wolfgang Waldstein (b. 1928)
33	William B. Walsh (1920–1996)	United States	"as the founder, president and medical director of Project HOPE, the world's first peacetime hospital ship, and for HOPE's accomplishments in international understanding, friendship and health having, and will continue having, an effect on world peace."	Robert P. Griffin (1923–2015)
34	Herman B. Wells (1902–2000)	United States	"for being a pioneer and a continuing and successful protagonist in the struggle towards peace."	professors at the University of Indiana
35	Paul Dudley White (1886–1973)	United States	"for his active and efficient dedication to the welfare and happiness of others, which constitutes one of the most noble creative forces of profound human solidarity and is indispensable for the triumph of peace in the world."	members of the Puerto Rican Legislative Assembly and Senate
35	Paul Dudley White (1886–1973)	United States	"for his extraordinary merit for peaceful understanding and friendly co-operation between cardiologists all over the world, wherein he has dedicated his life to furthering the liberal ideas of international humanism and demonstrating how small and large countries can participate in the friendly settlement of serious medical problems."	Oldrich Starý (1884–1971)
Organizations
36	International Labour Organization (ILO) (founded in 1919)	Geneva	"for its work for peace by promoting social justice in the world."	Moacyr de Oliveira (?)
36	International Labour Organization (ILO) (founded in 1919)	Geneva	"for its work for peace by promoting social justice in the world."	Léon-Eli Troclet (1902–1980)
36	International Labour Organization (ILO) (founded in 1919)	Geneva	"for its work for peace by promoting social justice in the world."	Jarbas Passarinho (1920–2016)
36	International Labour Organization (ILO) (founded in 1919)	Geneva	"for its work for peace by promoting social justice in the world."	Willy Spühler (1902–1990)
36	International Labour Organization (ILO) (founded in 1919)	Geneva	"for its admirable work in promoting social justice throughout the world, wherein it has put forward practical recommendations for dealing with social and labour problems and has furnished direct assistance in those fields that encourage the progress of the developing countries."	Edward Heath (1916–2005)
36	International Labour Organization (ILO) (founded in 1919)	Geneva	"for its work for creating norms to ensure humane working conditions and a respect for fundamental human rights."	Abdol Majid Majidi (1928–2014)
36	International Labour Organization (ILO) (founded in 1919)	Geneva	"for its impressive achievements in the interest of world peace, the promoting social justice and human rights."	Jack Lynch (1917–1999)
36	International Labour Organization (ILO) (founded in 1919)	Geneva	"for promoting the cause of peace through their successful activities for the elimination of social injustices and discrimination in relation to work life."	Sture Petrén (1908–1976)
36	International Labour Organization (ILO) (founded in 1919)	Geneva	"for its action in the service of peace over the past fifty years and their embodiment of the aspirations of peace, freedom, and justice."	Haile Selassie (1892–1975)
36	International Labour Organization (ILO) (founded in 1919)	Geneva	"for its impressive and important activity in the field of labour regulation and social conditions in order to further a lasting and universal peace."	Pietro Nenni (1891–1980)
36	International Labour Organization (ILO) (founded in 1919)	Geneva	"for its excellent record of achievement in improving the working conditions and the human rights of a vast number."	Philip Noel-Baker (1889–1982)
36	International Labour Organization (ILO) (founded in 1919)	Geneva	No motivation included.	members of the Swedish Legislative Assembly and Parliament
36	International Labour Organization (ILO) (founded in 1919)	Geneva	No motivation included.	Raúl Leoni (1905–1972)
37	International Union for Land Value Taxation and Free Trade (The IU) (founded in 1926)	London	No motivation included.	Francis Douglas (1889–1980)
38	Islands of Peace (founded in 1958)	Huy	"for its work against famine and to alleviate human suffering.	Raymond Vander Elst (1914–2008)
39	People of Czechoslovakia		"for, as a united people, having hindered armed conflict by choosing to walk the difficult way of non-violent civilian resistance instead."	3 professors at the University of Oslo; Gunnar Garbo (1924–2016)
40	Pugwash Conferences on Science and World Affairs (founded in 1957)	Pugwash, Nova Scotia	No motivation included.	Anders Bratholm (1920–2010)
41	The Salvation Army (founded in 1865)	London	No motivation included.	Rolf Danielsen (1922–2002); Knut Mykland (1920–2005); Alf Kaartvedt (1921–2013)
42	United Towns Organization (founded in 1957)	Aix-les-Bains	"for its tireless work to increase co-operation, free from all forms of discrimination, at the town-to-town level and the level of the masses."	Giorgio La Pira (1904–1977)
42	United Nations Educational, Scientific and Cultural Organization (UNESCO) (founded in 1945)	Paris	"[with Maheu] for their work for peace by education and the promotion of human culture in the world."	Léopold Sédar Senghor (1906–2001)
43	Universal Esperanto Association (UEA) (founded in 1908)	Rotterdam	"for its work to strengthen world peace by promoting understanding and collaboration."	Giuseppe Azzaro (1925–2022)
43	Universal Esperanto Association (UEA) (founded in 1908)	Rotterdam	"for its work to strengthen world peace by promoting understanding and collaboration."	Enrico Nicola Spadola (1920–1991)
43	Universal Esperanto Association (UEA) (founded in 1908)	Rotterdam	"for its work to strengthen world peace by promoting understanding and collaboration."	Giuseppe La Rosa (1915–1990)
43	Universal Esperanto Association (UEA) (founded in 1908)	Rotterdam	"for the vast amount of work it has done for world peace during the Year of Human Rights and the Year of international Collaboration and for their efforts to remove all disabilities of language and all discrimination against smaller nations, and strengthen the world peace."	R. M. Appuhamy (b. 1930)
43	Universal Esperanto Association (UEA) (founded in 1908)	Rotterdam	"for its work to bring understanding among the peoples, and for world peace."	Giuseppe Alpino (1909–1976)
43	Universal Esperanto Association (UEA) (founded in 1908)	Rotterdam	"for its worldwide decade long peace promoting work, and its efforts made in relation to the campaigns and events of the UN and UNESCO."	38 members of the Swedish Parliament
43	Universal Esperanto Association (UEA) (founded in 1908)	Rotterdam	"for worldwide activities, and especially their work in relation to the Year of International Co-Operation and the International Year of Human Rights."	6 members of the Norwegian Parliament
43	Universal Esperanto Association (UEA) (founded in 1908)	Rotterdam	"for its determined, constant, and significant striving for peace and for its comprehensive efforts to remove the challenge of international language barriers contributes to the lessening of tensions and promotes brotherhood and cooperation between peoples."	9 members of the Danish Parliament
44	Women's International League for Peace and Freedom (WILPF) (founded in 1915)	Geneva	"for its work to build bridges between peoples and for disarmament."	Marie Lous Mohr (1892–1973)

== Norwegian Nobel Committee ==
The following members of the Norwegian Nobel Committee appointed by the Storting were responsible for the selection of the 1969 Nobel laureate in accordance with the will of Alfred Nobel:

1969 Norwegian Nobel Committee
Picture	Name	Position	Political Party	Other posts
	Aase Lionæs (1907–1999)	Chairwoman	Labour	Vice President of the Lagting (1965–1973)
	Bernt Ingvaldsen (1902–1982)	Member	Conservative	President of the Storting (1965–1972)
	Helge Refsum (1897–1976)	Member	Centre	former Judge at the Gulating Court (1922–1949)
	Helge Rognlien (1920–2001)	Member	Liberal	former Leader of the Young Liberals of Norway (1946–1948)
	Erling Wikborg (1894–1992)	Member	Christian People	former Leader of the Christian Democratic Party (1951–1955)
