= 1967 Nobel Peace Prize =

Award

- "to the person (or group) who shall have done the most or the best work for fraternity between nations, for the abolition or reduction of standing armies and for the holding and promotion of peace congresses."
- Location: Oslo, Norway
- Presented by: Norwegian Nobel Committee
- First award: 1901
- Website: Official website

The 1967 Nobel Peace Prize was not awarded because the Norwegian Nobel Committee decided that none of the nominations met the criteria in Nobel's will. Instead, the prize money was allocated with 1/3 to the Main Fund and with 2/3 to the Special Fund of this prize section.

== Deliberations ==
=== Nominations ===
In total, the Norwegian Nobel Committee received 95 nominations for 37 individuals and 10 organizations such as Vinoba Bhave, Grenville Clark, Norman Cousins, Danilo Dolci, Pope Paul VI, Bertrand Russell (awarded the 1950 Nobel Prize in Literature), U Thant, the International Union for Land Value Taxation and Free Trade and the Universal Esperanto Association (UEA). The highest number of nominations – 11 recommendation letters – was for the Austrian–Japanese politician Richard von Coudenhove-Kalergi.

Twenty five of these nominees were nominated for the first time such as Abbé Pierre, Ernest Gruening, Kurt Hahn, Thích Nhất Hạnh, İsmet İnönü, Danny Kaye, Sargent Shriver, Geoffrey Leonard Cheshire, Binay Ranjan Sen, Amnesty International (awarded in 1977), the World Federation of United Nations Associations (WFUNA) and the Islands of Peace. The British philanthropist Sue Ryder was the only female nominee. Notable figures such as Félicien Challaye, Che Guevara, Woody Guthrie, Florence Jaffray Harriman, Harold Holt, Kathleen Innes, Annette Kolb, Mohammad Mosaddegh, Abraham Johannes Muste and Georges Vanier died in 1967 without having been nominated for the peace prize while the American philosopher William Ernest Hocking was nominated posthumously.

Official list of nominees and their nominators for the prize
No.	Nominee	Country/ Headquarters	Motivations	Nominator(s)
Individuals
1	Abbé Pierre, O.F.M.Cap (1912–2007)	France	No motivation included.	Bodil Koch (1903–1972)
1	Abbé Pierre, O.F.M.Cap (1912–2007)	France	No motivation included.	Poul Hartling (1914–2000)
1	Abbé Pierre, O.F.M.Cap (1912–2007)	France	No motivation included.	Julius Bomholt (1896–1969)
2	Vinoba Bhave (1895–1982)	India	No motivation included.	Dominique Pire, O.P. (1910–1969)
3	Charles Braibant (1889–1976)	France	No motivation included.	Gabriel Le Bras (1891–1970)
4	Frederick Burdick (?) (prob. Eugene Burdick (1918–1965))	United States	No motivation included.	Paul Douglas (1892–1976)
4	Frederick Burdick (?) (prob. Eugene Burdick (1918–1965))	United States	No motivation included.	Watkins Abbitt (1908–1998)
4	Frederick Burdick (?) (prob. Eugene Burdick (1918–1965))	United States	No motivation included.	Kenneth J. Gray (1924–2014)
5	Sanjib Chaudhuri (?)	India	No motivation included.	Thakur Bateshwar Singh (?)
6	Leonard Cheshire (1917–1992)	United Kingdom	No motivation included.	Bob Cotton (1915–2006)
7	Grenville Clark (1882–1967)	United States	No motivation included.	Henry Hicks (1915–1990)
7	Grenville Clark (1882–1967)	United States	No motivation included.	Brunson MacChesney (1909–1978)
7	Grenville Clark (1882–1967)	United States	No motivation included.	Arthur Larson (1910–1993)
7	Grenville Clark (1882–1967)	United States	No motivation included.	Norman MacKenzie (1894–1986)
7	Grenville Clark (1882–1967)	United States	No motivation included.	Joseph S. Clark Jr. (1901–1990)
7	Grenville Clark (1882–1967)	United States	No motivation included.	Robert Kastenmeier (1924–2015)
7	Grenville Clark (1882–1967)	United States	No motivation included.	Louis Susky (?)
7	Grenville Clark (1882–1967)	United States	No motivation included.	Arturo Orzábal de la Quintana (1892–1969)
7	Grenville Clark (1882–1967)	United States	No motivation included.	Harold J. Berman (1918–2007)
8	Walter Corti (1910–1990)	Switzerland	No motivation included.	Max Goldener (?)
9	Norman Cousins (1915–1990)	United States	No motivation included.	Norman St John-Stevas (1929–2012)
9	Norman Cousins (1915–1990)	United States	No motivation included.	Mervyn Stockwood (1913–1995)
10	Danilo Dolci (1924–1997)	Italy	No motivation included.	John Kay (b. 1942)
10	Danilo Dolci (1924–1997)	Italy	No motivation included.	members of the Swedish Parliament
11	Harry Elias Edmonds (1883–1979)	United States	No motivation included.	Oliver Kitson (1915–1996)
12	J. William Fulbright (1905–1995)	United States	No motivation included.	Giannēs Koutsocheras (1904–1994)
13	Ernest Gruening (1887–1974)	United States	No motivation included.	Denna Frank Fleming (1893–1980)
14	Kurt Hahn (1886–1974)	Germany	No motivation included.	Helmut Haussmann (b. 1943)
14	Kurt Hahn (1886–1974)	Germany	No motivation included.	Hugh Trevor-Roper (1914–2003)
15	Thích Nhất Hạnh (1926–2022)	Vietnam	"for his lifelong efforts to promote peace, social justice and reconciliation in between North and South Vietnam."	George McTurnan Kahin (1918–2000)
15	Thích Nhất Hạnh (1926–2022)	Vietnam	"for his lifelong efforts to promote peace, social justice and reconciliation in between North and South Vietnam."	Martin Luther King Jr. (1929–1968)
15	Thích Nhất Hạnh (1926–2022)	Vietnam	"for his lifelong efforts to promote peace, social justice and reconciliation in between North and South Vietnam."	Walter Nash (1882–1968)
15	Thích Nhất Hạnh (1926–2022)	Vietnam	"for his lifelong efforts to promote peace, social justice and reconciliation in between North and South Vietnam."	Jim Cairns (1914–2003)
15	Thích Nhất Hạnh (1926–2022)	Vietnam	"for his lifelong efforts to promote peace, social justice and reconciliation in between North and South Vietnam."	John G. Dow (1905–2003)
15	Thích Nhất Hạnh (1926–2022)	Vietnam	"for his lifelong efforts to promote peace, social justice and reconciliation in between North and South Vietnam."	Lawrence Fuchs (1927–2013)
15	Thích Nhất Hạnh (1926–2022)	Vietnam	"for his lifelong efforts to promote peace, social justice and reconciliation in between North and South Vietnam."	Horace L. Friess (1900–1975)
16	William Ernest Hocking (1873–1966)	United States	No motivation included.	Bob Wilson (1916–1999)
17	William P. Holman (1914–2003)	United States	No motivation included.	Odin Langen (1913–1976)
18	Robert Maynard Hutchins (1899–1977)	United States	No motivation included.	J. William Fulbright (1905–1995)
19	İsmet İnönü (1884–1973)	Turkey	No motivation included.	members of Turkish Parliament
20	Marc Joux (?)	France	No motivation included.	Auguste Billiemaz (1903–1983)
21	Danny Kaye (1911–1987)	United States	"for his role as the first UNICEF Goodwill Ambassador."	John H. Lavely (b. 1943)
22	Wayne Morse (1900–1974)	United States	No motivation included.	Denna Frank Fleming (1893–1980)
23	Mohammad Reza Pahlavi (1919–1980)	Iran	No motivation included.	members of the British Parliament
24	Pope Paul VI (1897–1978)	Vatican City	No motivation included.	José María Gil-Robles y Quiñones (1898–1980)
25	Charles S. Rhyne (1912–2003)	United States	No motivation included.	Frank Moss (1911–2003)
26	Das Moni Roy (1895–?)	India	No motivation included.	Subimal Kunnar Mukherjee (?)
27	Bertrand Russell (1872–1970)	United Kingdom	No motivation included.	Ivan Petrovsky (1901–1973)
28	Sue Ryder (1924–2000)	United Kingdom	No motivation included.	Rab Butler (1902–1982)
28	Sue Ryder (1924–2000)	United Kingdom	No motivation included.	Bob Cotton (1915–2006)
29	Binay Ranjan Sen (1898–1993)	India	No motivation included.	Rakel Seweriin (1906–1995)
30	Sargent Shriver (1915–2011)	United States	No motivation included.	Richard Ottinger (b. 1929)
31	Isidor Feinstein Stone (1907–1989)	United States	No motivation included.	Linus Pauling (1901–1994)
32	Clarence Streit (1896–1986)	United States	No motivation included.	Geoffrey de Freitas (1913–1982)
33	U Thant (1909–1974)	Burma	No motivation included.	American Friends Service Committee (Note: The nomination was made by Colin W Bell on behalf of American Friends Service Committee.)
33	U Thant (1909–1974)	Burma	No motivation included.	Friends Service Council (Note: The nomination was made by George W Whiteman on behalf of Friends Service Council.)
33	U Thant (1909–1974)	Burma	No motivation included.	professors at the Leiden University
33	U Thant (1909–1974)	Burma	No motivation included.	5 members of the Norwegian Parliament
34	Östen Undén (1886–1974)	Sweden	No motivation included.	members of the Swedish Parliament
35	Richard von Coudenhove-Kalergi (1894–1972)	Austria; Japan	No motivation included.	Gaston Eyskens (1905–1988)
35	Richard von Coudenhove-Kalergi (1894–1972)	Austria; Japan	No motivation included.	Victor Larock (1904–1977)
35	Richard von Coudenhove-Kalergi (1894–1972)	Austria; Japan	No motivation included.	John Biggs-Davison (1918–1988)
35	Richard von Coudenhove-Kalergi (1894–1972)	Austria; Japan	No motivation included.	Arthur Gibson (?)
35	Richard von Coudenhove-Kalergi (1894–1972)	Austria; Japan	No motivation included.	Rudolf Suter (1914–2011)
35	Richard von Coudenhove-Kalergi (1894–1972)	Austria; Japan	No motivation included.	François Perin (1921–2013)
35	Richard von Coudenhove-Kalergi (1894–1972)	Austria; Japan	No motivation included.	Hans-Joachim von Merkatz (1905–1982)
35	Richard von Coudenhove-Kalergi (1894–1972)	Austria; Japan	No motivation included.	Erich Mende (1916–1998)
35	Richard von Coudenhove-Kalergi (1894–1972)	Austria; Japan	No motivation included.	Friedrich Heer (1916–1983)
35	Richard von Coudenhove-Kalergi (1894–1972)	Austria; Japan	No motivation included.	Franz Josef Strauss (1915–1988)
35	Richard von Coudenhove-Kalergi (1894–1972)	Austria; Japan	No motivation included.	Leopoldo Rubinacci (1903–1969)
36	Quincy Wright (1890–1970)	United States	No motivation included.	J. David Singer (1925–2009)
37	Shigeru Yoshida (1878–1967)	Japan	No motivation included.	3 members of the Permanent Court of Arbitration
37	Shigeru Yoshida (1878–1967)	Japan	No motivation included.	Shigeru Kuriyama (1886–1971)
Organizations
38	Amnesty International (founded in 1961)	London	No motivation included.	4 members of the Norwegian Parliament
38	Amnesty International (founded in 1961)	London	No motivation included.	9 professors at the University of Oslo
39	Islands of Peace (founded in 1958)	Huy	No motivation included.	Willy De Clercq (1927–2011)
39	Islands of Peace (founded in 1958)	Huy	No motivation included.	Raymond Vander Elst (1914–2008)
40	Lions Clubs International (founded in 1917)	Oak Brook	No motivation included.	Howard Cannon (1912–2002)
40	Lions Clubs International (founded in 1917)	Oak Brook	No motivation included.	Kaare Meland (1915–2002)
40	Lions Clubs International (founded in 1917)	Oak Brook	No motivation included.	Karl Boo (1918–1996)
41	International Planned Parenthood Federation (IPPF) (founded in 1952)	London	No motivation included.	6 members of the Swedish Parliament
42	International Union for Land Value Taxation and Free Trade (The IU) (founded in 1926)	London	No motivation included.	Johan Møller Warmedal (1914–1988)
43	Organization of American States (OAS) (founded in 1948)	Washington, D.C.	No motivation included.	Carlos Dunshee de Abranches (1913–1983)
43	Organization of American States (OAS) (founded in 1948)	Washington, D.C.	No motivation included.	B. J. Tennery (?)
44	United Poets Laureate International (UPLI) (founded in 1963)	Manila	"for promoting world brotherhood and peace through poetry"	Angel Macapagal (1917–1993)
45	Universal Esperanto Association (UEA) (founded in 1908)	Rotterdam	No motivation included.	Werner Kubitza (1919–1995)
45	Universal Esperanto Association (UEA) (founded in 1908)	Rotterdam	No motivation included.	Karl Geldner (1927–2017)
45	Universal Esperanto Association (UEA) (founded in 1908)	Rotterdam	No motivation included.	members of the Swedish Parliament
45	Universal Esperanto Association (UEA) (founded in 1908)	Rotterdam	No motivation included.	Émile Durieux (1905–1995)
45	Universal Esperanto Association (UEA) (founded in 1908)	Rotterdam	No motivation included.	Louis Philibert (1912–2000)
45	Universal Esperanto Association (UEA) (founded in 1908)	Rotterdam	No motivation included.	Franz Stein (1900–1967)
45	Universal Esperanto Association (UEA) (founded in 1908)	Rotterdam	No motivation included.	5 members of the Norwegian Parliament
45	Universal Esperanto Association (UEA) (founded in 1908)	Rotterdam	No motivation included.	Kjell Bondevik (1901–1983)
46	Women's International League for Peace and Freedom (WILPF) (founded in 1915)	Geneva	No motivation included.	Marie Lous Mohr (1892–1973)
47	World Federation of United Nations Associations (WFUNA) (founded in 1946)	New York City	No motivation included.	Paul Guggenheim (1899–1977)

== Norwegian Nobel Committee ==
The following members of the Norwegian Nobel Committee appointed by the Storting were responsible for the selection of the 1969 Nobel laureate in accordance with the will of Alfred Nobel:

1969 Norwegian Nobel Committee
Picture	Name	Position	Political Party	Other posts
	Nils Langhelle (Note: "When Langhelle died in August 1967, Ingvaldsen replaced him as chairman and Erling Wikborg became a new member of the Committee.") (1907–1967)	Chairman (until August)	Labour	former Minister of Defence (1952–1954); President of the Storting (1958–1965)
	Bernt Ingvaldsen (1902–1982)	Chairman (from August)	Conservative	President of the Storting (1965–1972)
	Aase Lionæs (1907–1999)	Member	Labour	Vice President of the Lagting (1965–1973)
	Helge Refsum (1897–1976)	Member	Centre	former Judge at the Gulating Court (1922–1949)
	Helge Rognlien (1920–2001)	Member	Liberal	former Leader of the Young Liberals of Norway (1946–1948)
	Erling Wikborg (1894–1992)	Member	Christian People	former Leader of the Christian Democratic Party (1951–1955)
