= International union =

International union may refer to:

- Trade union having affiliated locals in more than one country. Examples include International Ladies Garment Workers Union (ILGWU), International Longshoremen's and Warehousemen's Union, and International Typographical Union.
- The IU, an NGO colloquially referred to as The International Union
