= Runnymede =

Water-meadow in England

- Water-meadow
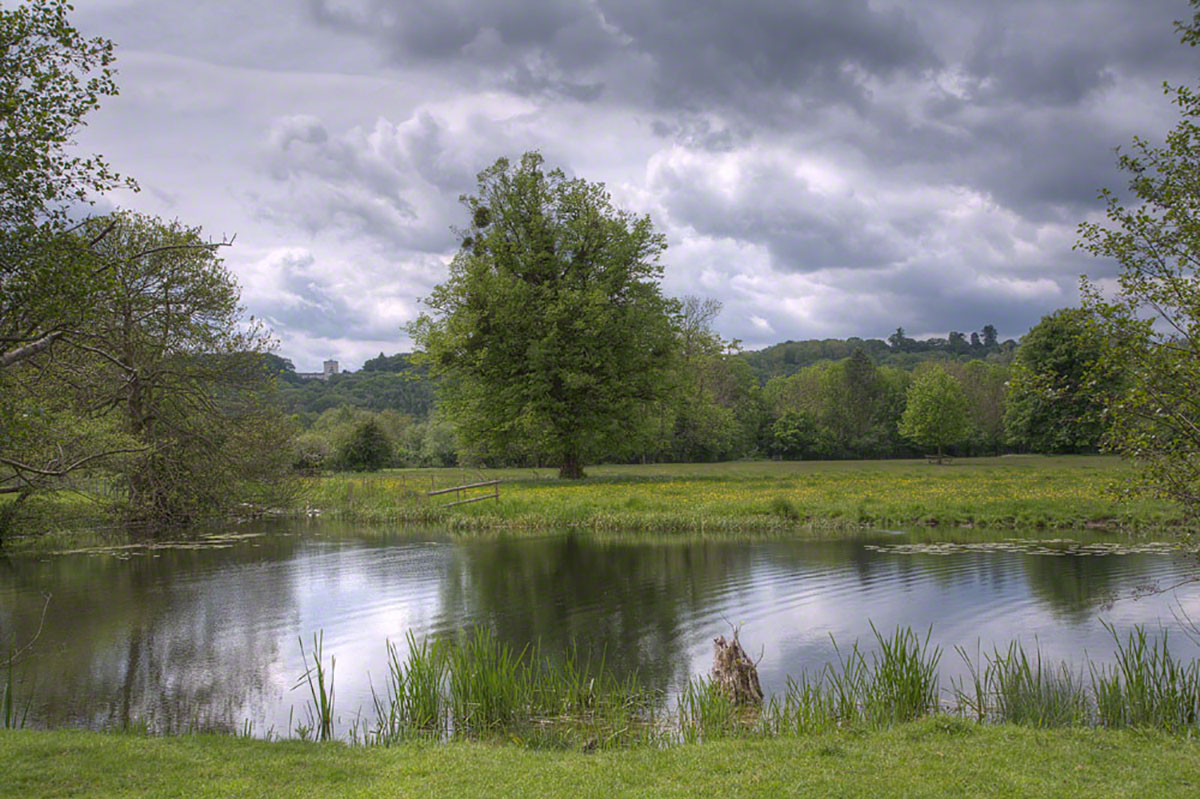
- View over Magna Carta Island towards Runnymede

- Location within Surrey
- Coordinates: 51°26′40″N 00°33′55″W
- Location: Surrey
- Water bodies: River Thames

Runnymede is a water-meadow alongside the River Thames in the English county of Surrey, bordering Berkshire and just over 20 miles (32 km) west of central London. It is notable for its association with the sealing of Magna Carta, and as a consequence is, with its adjoining hillside, the site of memorials. Runnymede Borough (to be abolished in 2027) is named after the area, Runnymede being at its northernmost point.

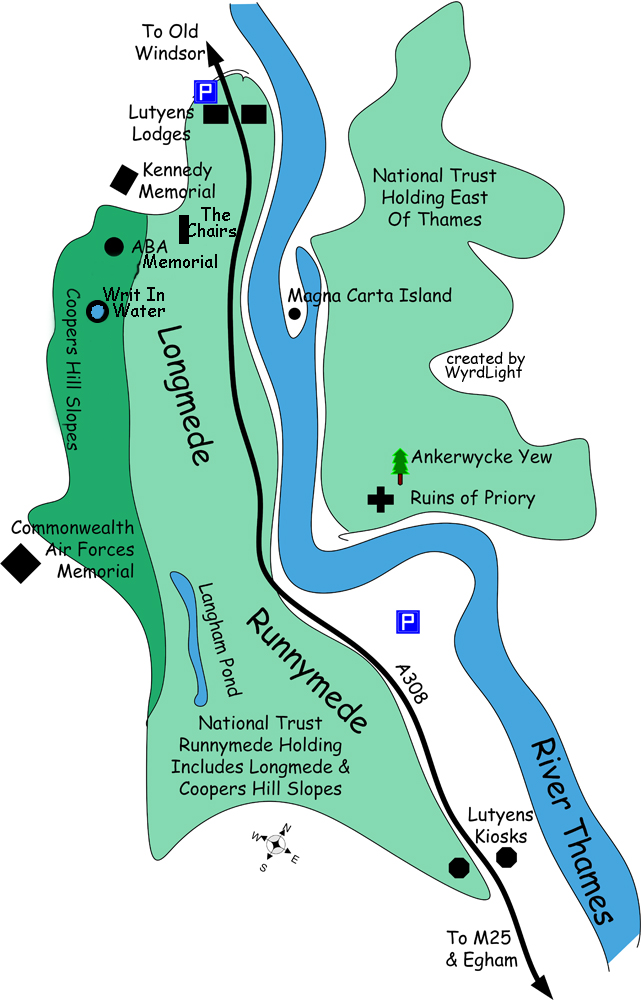
Map of Runnymede area: north-west is to the top

== Topography ==
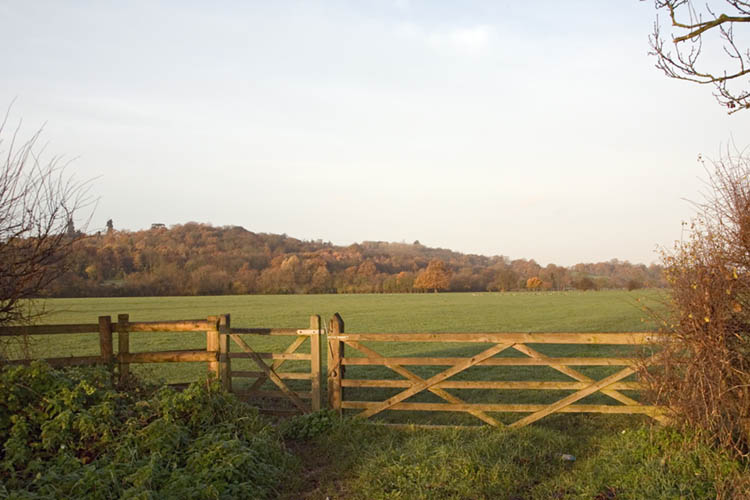
Runnymede water-meadow viewed from south-east of National Trust land

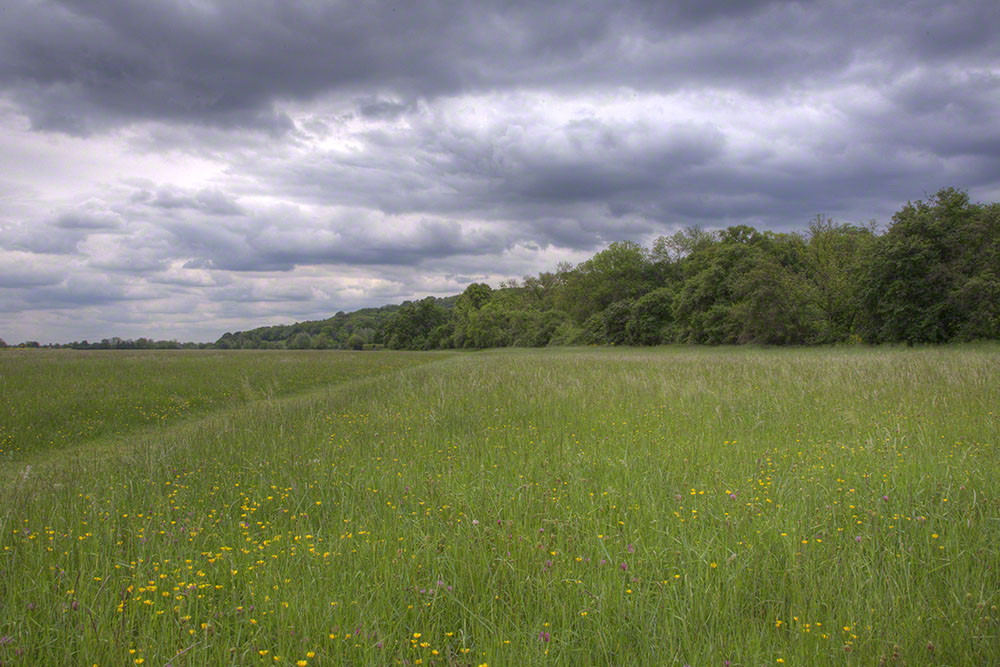
Long Mede pasture at Runnymede viewed from north-west of National Trust land

The name Runnymede refers to land in public and National Trust ownership in the Thames flood plain south-west of the river between Old Windsor and Egham. The area includes (to the west of A308 road) the Long Mede and Runnymede, which together with Coopers Hill Slopes is managed by the National Trust. There is also a narrower strip of land, east of the road and west of the river, known as the Yard Mede. On the west bank of the river, at the southern end of the area shown on the map, are (inter alia): a recreational area with a large car park; a number of private homes; a large distribution centre; and a hotel.

The landscape of Runnymede is characterised as "Thames Basin Lowland", an urban fringe. It is a gently undulating vale of small fields interspersed by woods, shaws, ponds, meadows, and heath. The National Trust area is a Site of Nature Conservation Interest (SNCI) which contains a Site of Special Scientific Interest. Both sites are overseen by Runnymede Borough Council.

The National Trust holding includes:

- 188 acres (76 ha) donated in 1929 set behind a narrow riverside park with occasional benches on the southern river bank, with car and coach parking;
- 110 acres (45 ha) of broadleaved woodland on Coopers Hill Slopes, given in 1963 by the former Egham Urban District Council. (Note: In April 1974, the Council was subsumed within Runnymede Borough.)

Long Mede is a meadow north of the ancient "mede" (meadow) of Runnymede towards Old Windsor and has been used for centuries to provide good-quality hay from the alluvial pasture. Runnymede itself lies towards Egham. It is likely that Runnymede proper was the site of the sealing of Magna Carta, although the Magna Carta Memorial stands on Long Mede.

The sealing of Magna Carta is also popularly associated with Magna Carta Island, on the opposite (east) bank of the Thames. It has also sometimes been associated with the nearby Ankerwycke Yew. These and their surrounding landscape of floodplain and parkland may once have formed an integral part of Runnymede, as the river has occasionally changed its course here. Ankerwycke and the ruins of the 12th-century Priory of St Mary's were both acquired by the National Trust in 1998. As the Thames forms the county boundary at this point, these areas now lie in Berkshire.

== History ==
Runnymede's historical significance has been heavily influenced by its proximity to the Roman Road river-crossing at nearby Staines-upon-Thames.

The name Runnymede is believed to derive from the Middle English runinge (taking counsel) and mede (mead or meadow), describing a place in the meadows used to hold regular meetings. The Witan, Witenagemot or Council of the Anglo-Saxon Kings of the 7th to 11th centuries met from time to time at Runnymede during the reign of Alfred the Great (871–899). The Council usually assembled in the open air. This political organ transformed in succeeding years, influencing the creation of England's 13th-century parliament.

The water-meadow at Runnymede is the most likely location at which, in 1215, King John sealed Magna Carta. The charter itself references Runnymede by name as "Ronimed. inter Windlesoram et Stanes" (between Windsor and Staines). Magna Carta affected common and constitutional law as well as political representation, also affecting the development of parliament.

Runnymede's association with ideals of democracy, limitation of power, equality and freedom under law has attracted the placement there of monuments and commemorative symbols.

The last fatal duel in England took place in 1852, on Priest Hill, a continuation of Cooper's Hill by Windsor Great Park.

The National Trust land was donated in 1929 by Cara Rogers Broughton and her two sons. The American-born widow of Urban Hanlon Broughton, she was permitted by letter from George V to join her son's new peerage in tribute to her husband and this gift and be styled Lady Fairhaven. The gift was given in memory of Urban Broughton. At the time the New Bedford Standard-Times commented: "It must be a source of gratification to all Americans, and especially to us here and in Fairhaven, that the presentation of this historic spot as public ground has been brought about by an American woman, an appropriate enough circumstance considering that the great charter underlies the USA's conception of government and human rights."

=== Runnymede Eco Village ===
Between 2012 and 2015, Cooper's Hill was occupied by a radical community living in self-build houses, huts, benders, and tents in the self-proclaimed "Runnymede Eco Village". Around 40 people, including a few young families, lived in a dispersed settlement throughout the 4 acres of woodland. They used mainly reclaimed material to build living structures, solar power to generate electricity, wood-burners for heat, cultivated some vegetables and kept chickens and geese. Water was obtained from springs on the site, and the village was largely hidden from view from outside the woodland. The members called themselves "Diggers" after the 17th-century Diggers movement.

There were two unsuccessful attempts to evict the settlers in the first year of occupation; and on 30 March 2015 bailiffs served a further High Court trespass notice on behalf of the landowners, Orchard Runnymede Ltd. The settlers were still in occupation during the Magna Carta 800th anniversary celebrations on 15 June, but their presence did not affect proceedings, and the eviction was completed at a later date.

== Features ==
=== Urban H. Broughton memorials ===
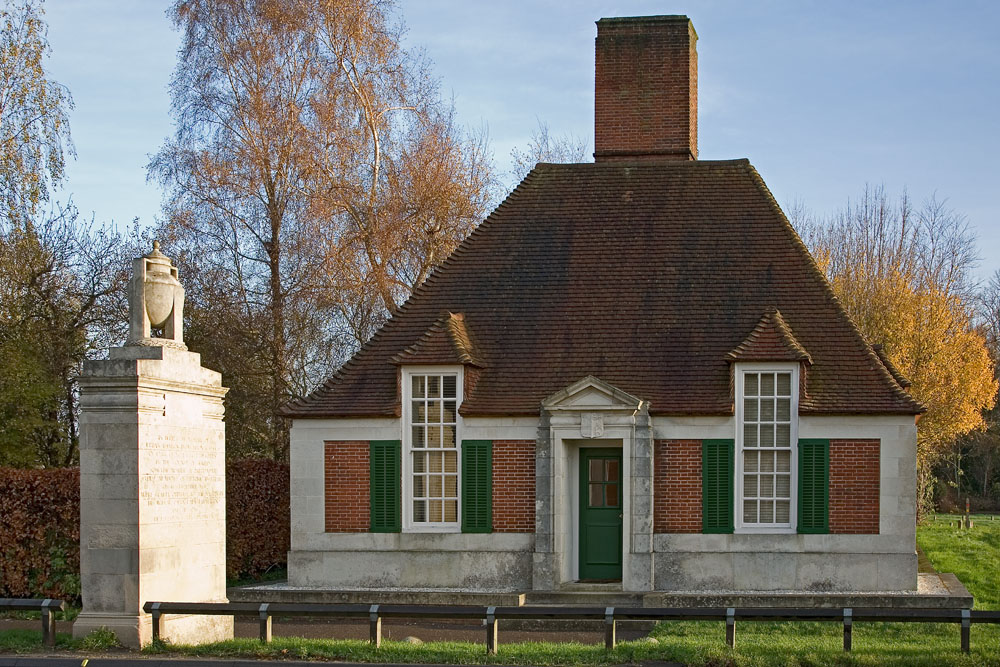
Lutyens designed memorial lodge and pier

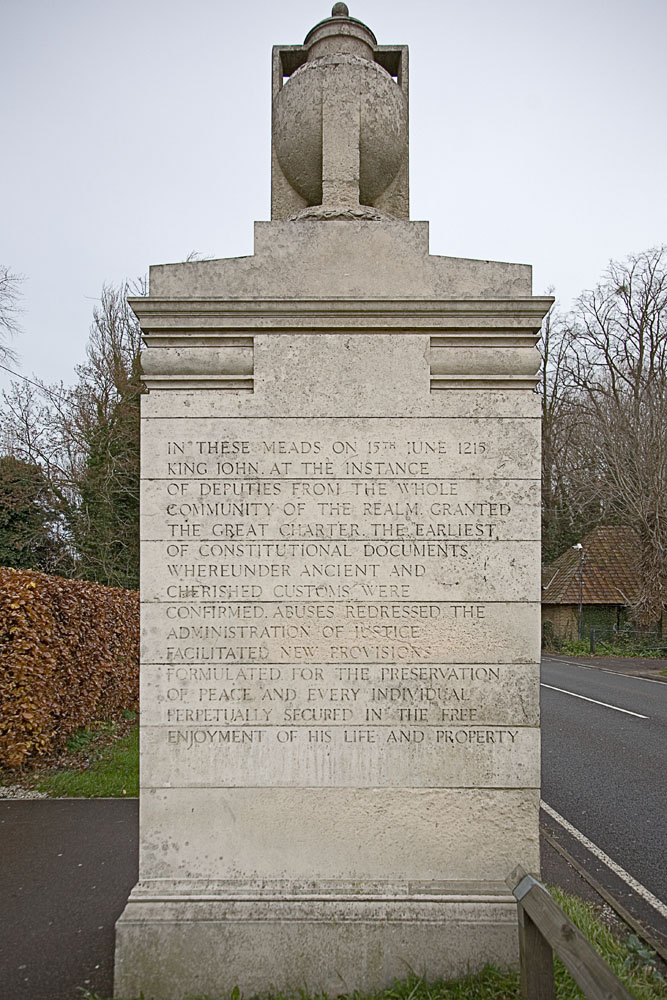
Lutyens designed pier commemorating Magna Carta

After the death of Urban Broughton in 1929, Sir Edwin Lutyens was commissioned to design a set of twin memorials consisting of large kiosks and posts or "piers" with stone blocks crowned with laurel wreaths and formalised urns at the Egham end and with lodges and piers at the Windsor end. Lutyens also designed a low wide arch bridge to carry the main road over the Thames to the north, integrating the road layout and bridge design into his plans for the memorials. The southern kiosks were moved to their present location when the M25 motorway was constructed.

There are two octagonal kiosks with piers facing each other across the A308 towards Egham. These piers are a shorter version of those adjacent to the lodges either side of the same road towards Old Windsor in the Long Mede. The lodges show typical Lutyens design features with steeply angled roofs, large false chimneys and no rainwater gutters at the eaves.

The piers carry similar inscriptions. On one face is the inscription:

In these Meads on 15th June 1215 King John at the instance of Deputies from the whole community of the Realm granted the Great Charter the earliest of constitutional documents whereunder ancient and cherished customs were confirmed abuses redressed and the administration of justice facilitated new provisions formulated for the preservation of peace and every individual perpetually secured in the free enjoyment of his life and property.

and on the other the words:

In perpetual memory of Urban Hanlon Broughton 1857–1929 of Park Close Englefield Green in the county of Surrey Sometime Member of Parliament These meadows of historic interest on 18th December 1929 were gladly offered to the Nation by his widow Cara Lady Fairhaven and his sons Huttleston Lord Fairhaven and Henry Broughton

The memorials were opened in 1932 by Edward VIII and are Grade II listed buildings.

=== Langham Pond SSSI ===
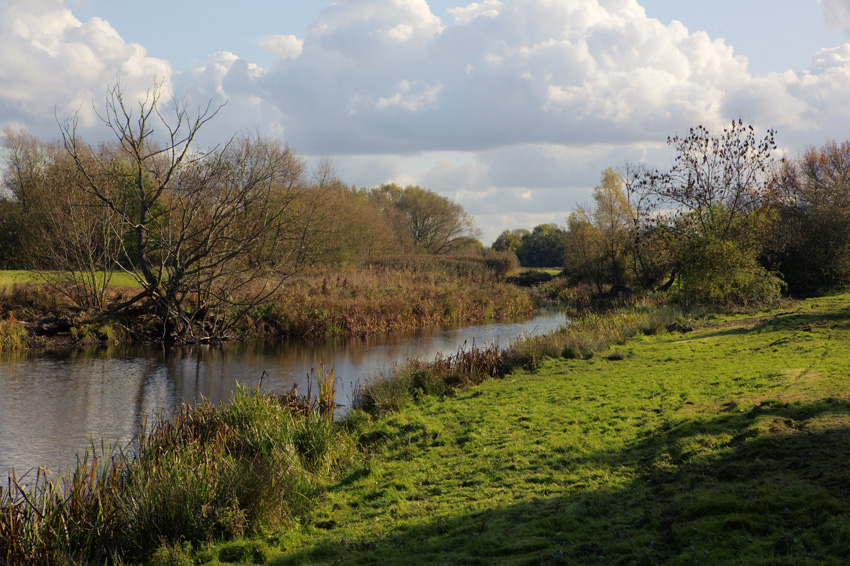
Western stretch of Langham Pond

Langham Pond was created when the meandering River Thames formed an oxbow lake. Its status as a wetland Site of Special Scientific Interest (SSSI) was first notified in 1975 and later reviewed under Section 28 of the Wildlife and Countryside Act 1981 when the protected area was extended to 64 acres (260,000 m^{2}) within Runnymede as managed by the National Trust.

The pond and associated meadow form a habitat considered unique in Southern England and of international importance for nature conservation. The flora and fauna include nationally scarce plants and insects including a species of fly unrecorded elsewhere in the United Kingdom.

=== Air Forces Memorial ===
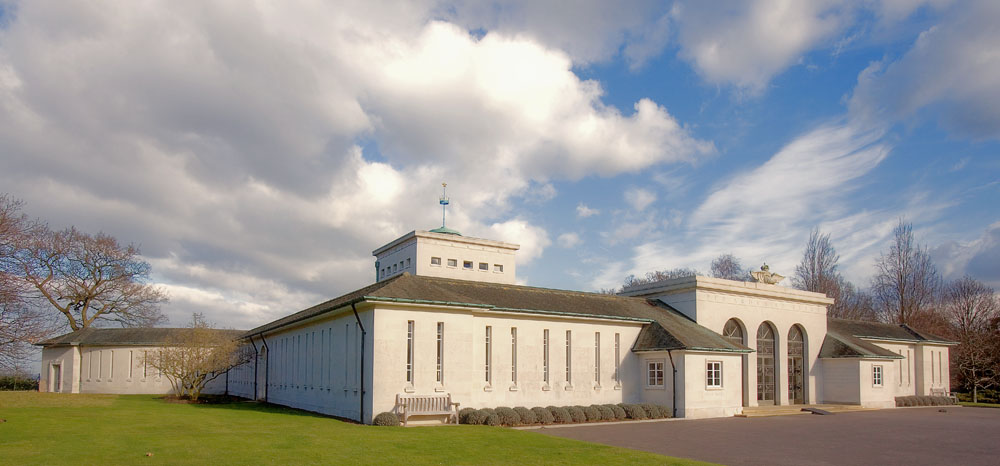
Commonwealth Air Forces Memorial

The Air Forces Memorial commemorates the men and women of the Allied Air Forces who died during the Second World War and records the names of the 20,456 airmen who have no known grave.

From the top of the tower visitors can see long views over Windsor, the surrounding counties and aircraft taking off and landing at Heathrow. On a good day visitors can see as far as the Wembley Arch and even the Gherkin in the City of London. The memorial was designed by Edward Maufe, architect of Guildford Cathedral, with architectural sculptures by Vernon Hill.

=== John F. Kennedy Memorial ===
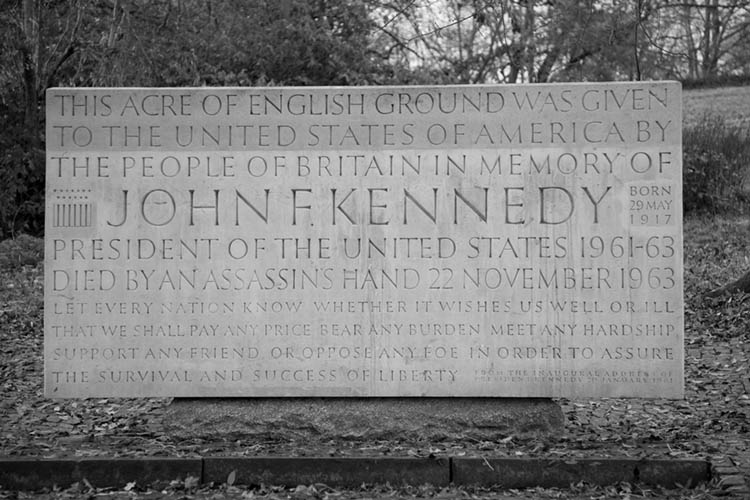
John F. Kennedy Memorial designed by Geoffrey Jellicoe

The government and the opposition parties in Westminster agreed on the establishment of a committee to make recommendations on the location of a British memorial to U.S. President John F. Kennedy. The committee was chaired by Oliver Franks, Baron Franks. The John F. Kennedy Memorial Act 1964 was passed to enable the establishment of a memorial in Runneymede. A small committee chaired by Lord Sherfield was established to oversee the implementation the recommendation of the Franks committee.

On 14 May 1965, Queen Elizabeth II and Jacqueline Kennedy jointly dedicated the memorial, prior to a reception for the Kennedy family at Windsor Castle. It consists of a garden and Portland stone memorial tablet inscribed with a quote from Kennedy's Inaugural Address:

Let every Nation know, whether it wishes us well or ill, that we shall pay any price, bear any burden, meet any hardship, support any friend or oppose any foe, in order to assure the survival and success of liberty.

Visitors reach the memorial by treading a steep path of 50 irregular granite steps, intended to symbolise a pilgrimage, where each step represents one of the 50 states in the USA. Each step is different from all the others, with the entire flight made from 60,000 hand-cut granite setts.

Landscape architect Geoffrey Jellicoe designed the garden; sculptor Alan Collins designed and carved the stone inscription.

The area of ground on which the memorial is situated was given as a gift to the United States by the people of the United Kingdom, although the area remains under the sovereignty of the United Kingdom.

The memorial is maintained by the Kennedy Memorial Trust, which also sponsors educational scholarships for British students to attend university in the United States.

In 1968, the 7-ton stone was damaged by a bomb during a time of anti-Vietnam War demonstrations. It was later repaired by the sculptor.

=== Magna Carta Memorial ===
Situated in a grassed enclosure, on the lower slopes of Cooper's Hill, this memorial is of a domed classical style monopteros, containing a pillar of English granite on which is inscribed "To commemorate Magna Carta, symbol of Freedom Under Law". The memorial was created by the American Bar Association (ABA) after a suggestion by the lawyer and historian Louis Ottenberg. Designed by Sir Edward Maufe R.A., it was unveiled on 18 July 1957 at a ceremony attended by American and English lawyers.

Since 1957 representatives of the ABA have visited and rededicated the Memorial, renewing pledges to the Great Charter. In 1971 and 1985 commemorative stones were placed on the Memorial plinth. In July 2000 the ABA came:

to celebrate Magna Carta, foundation of the rule of law for ages past and for the new millennium.

In 2007, on its 50th anniversary, the ABA again visited Runnymede. During its convention it installed as President Charles S. Rhyne, who devised Law Day, which in the United States represents an annual reaffirmation of faith in the forces of law for peace. Floodlights were installed in 2008 to light the memorial at night.

In 2015, in anticipation of the 800th anniversary of the sealing of Magna Carta, the two wooden benches at the memorial were replaced by stone benches. On 15 June, the anniversary day, the ABA, accompanied by United States Attorney General Loretta Lynch, rededicated the memorial in a ceremony led by Anne, Princess Royal in the presence of Elizabeth II and other members of the British royal family.

The Magna Carta Memorial is administered by the Magna Carta Trust, which is chaired by the Master of the Rolls.

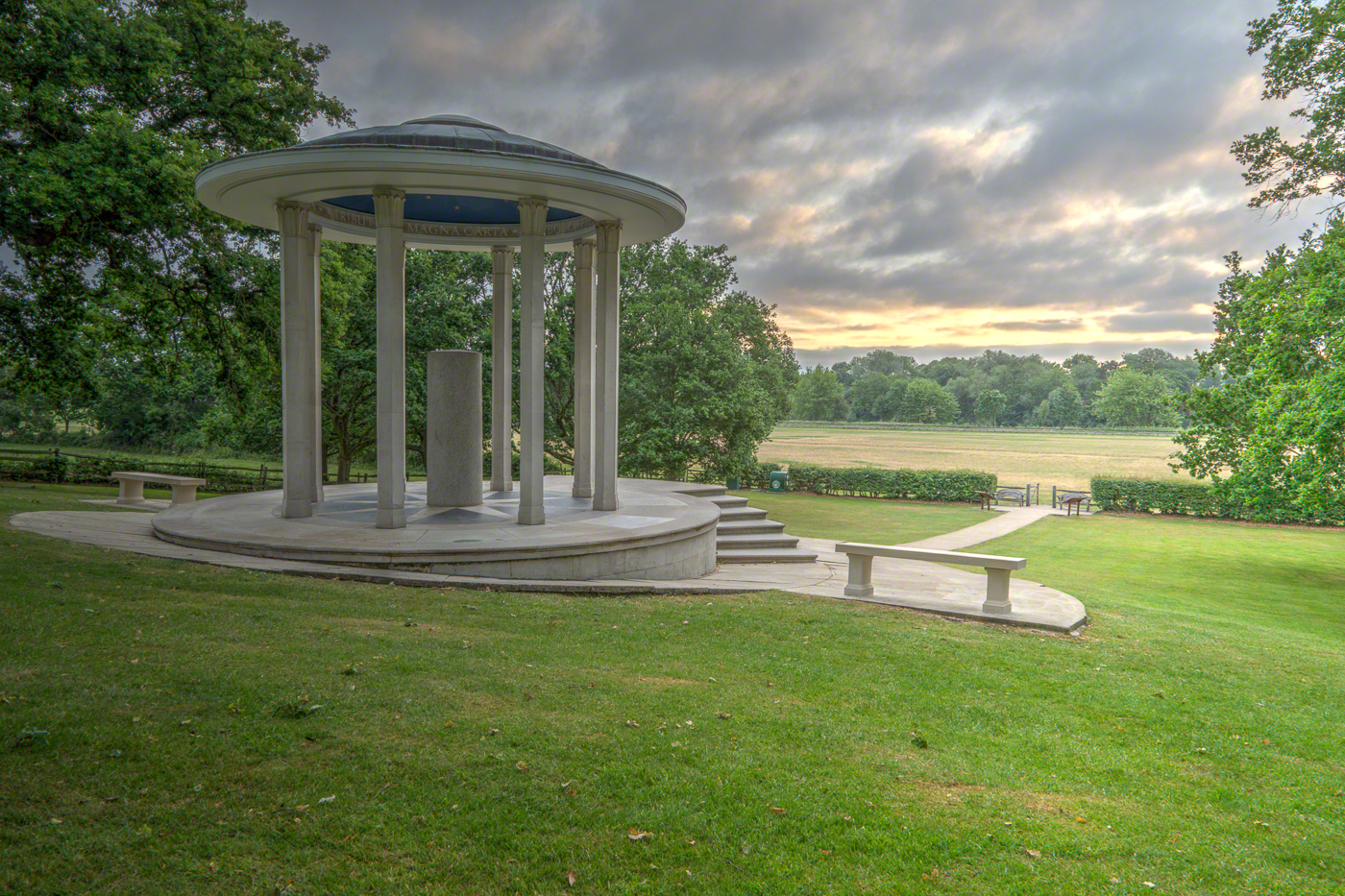
ABA tribute to Magna Carta at Runnymede with stone benches installed in 2015

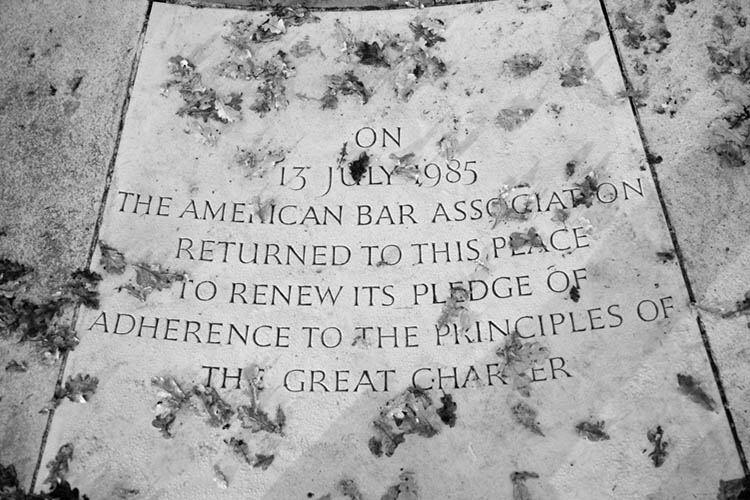
Engraved stone recalling the 1985 ABA visit

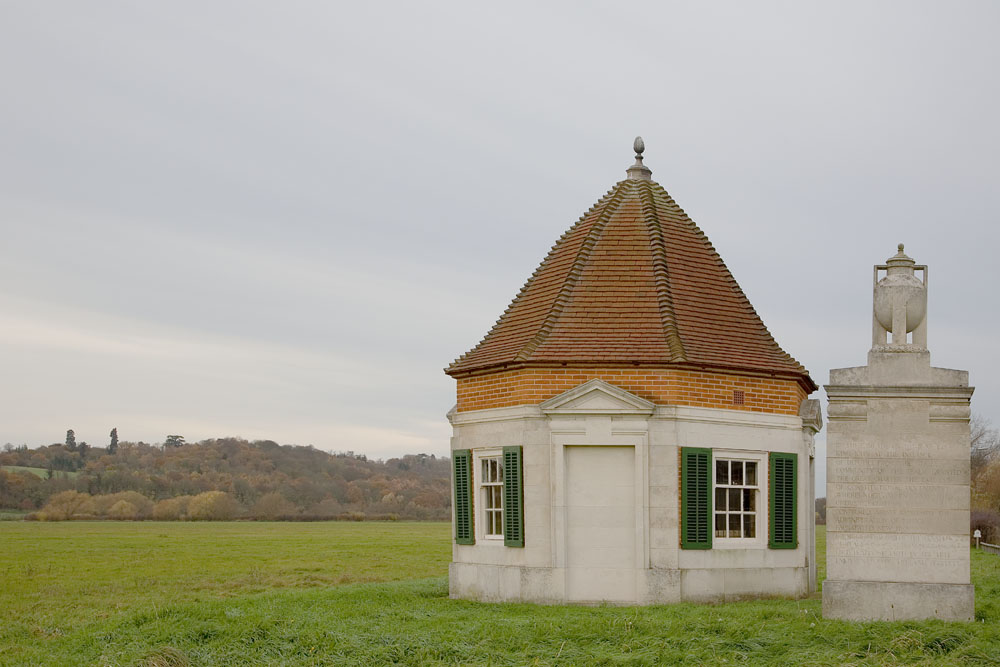
Lutyens designed memorial kiosk and pier

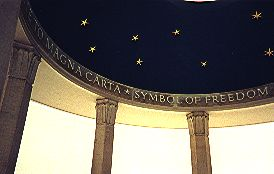
Detail of the roof of the Magna Carta memorial.

=== Ceremonial tree plantings ===
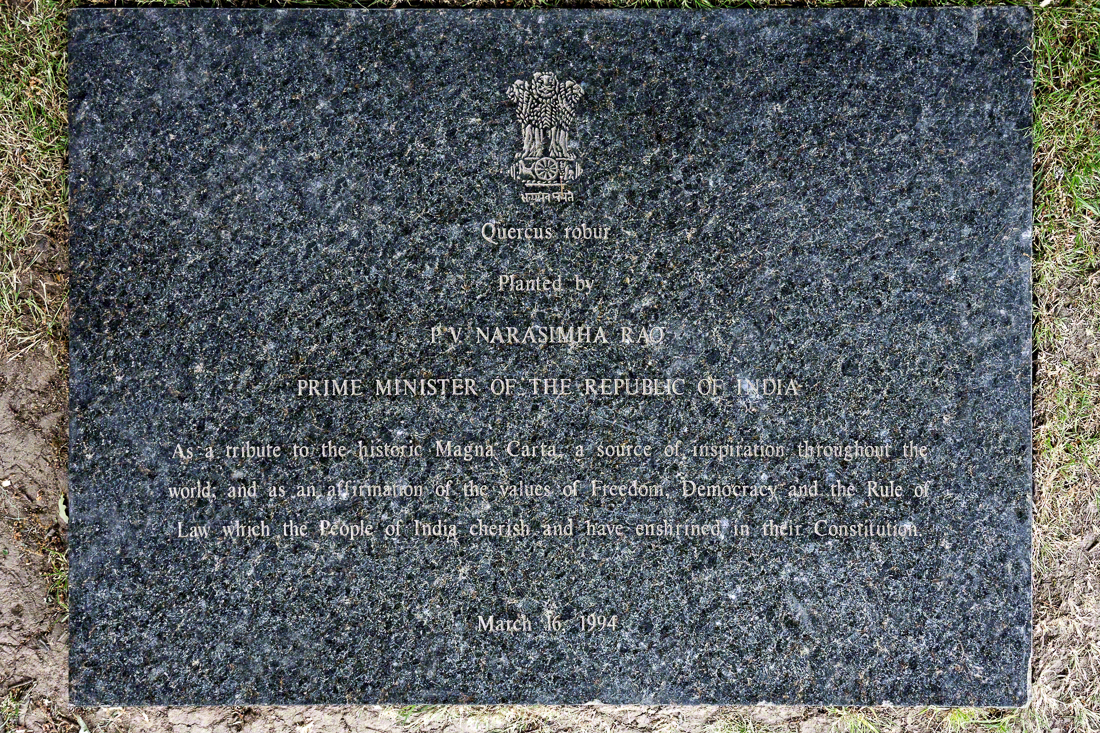
The Republic of India plaque beneath the oak tree planted by former Prime Minister Rao

Prince Edward, Duke of Kent together with David K. Diebold, a Minister-Counselor at the US Embassy in London, planted an oak tree adjacent to the Magna Carta Memorial in 1987, as did P. V. Narasimha Rao, prime minister of India. The Prime Minister left a plaque reading:

As a tribute to the historic Magna Carta, a source of inspiration throughout the world, and as an affirmation of the values of Freedom, Democracy and the Rule of Law which the People of India cherish and have enshrined in their Constitution. March 16, 1994

In 1987 two further oak trees were planted near the Memorial. One, planted by Queen Elizabeth II, marked National Tree Week. Another, planted by John O. Marsh Jr., United States Secretary of the Army, has a plaque which reads:

This oak tree, planted with soil from Jamestown, Virginia, the first permanent English settlement in the New World, commemorates the bicentenary of the Constitution of the United States of America. It stands in acknowledgement that the ideals of liberty and justice embodied in the Constitution trace their lineage through institutions of English law to Magna Carta, sealed at Runnymede on June 15th, 1215.

=== The Jurors ===
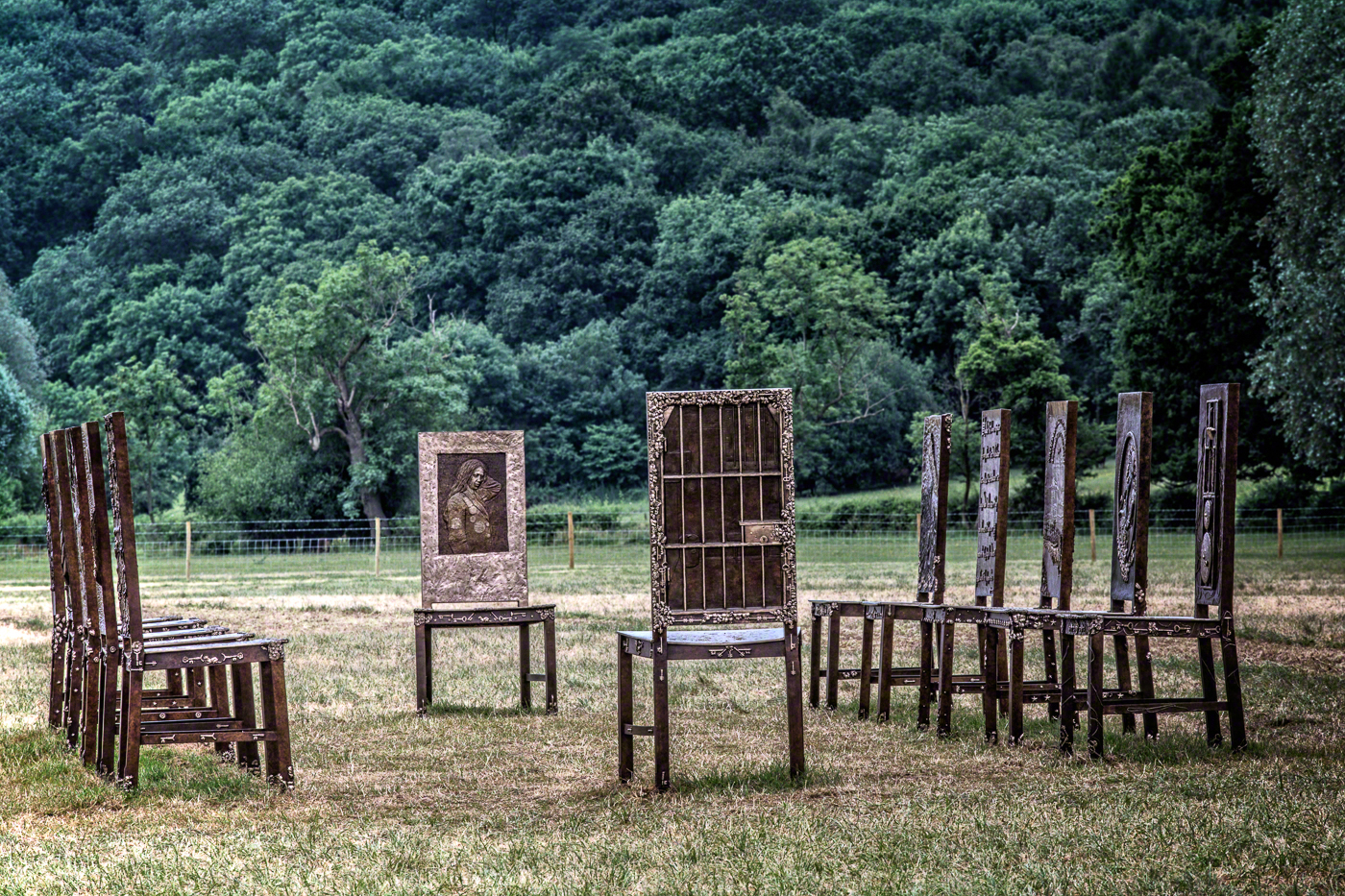
The Jurors art installation in bronze at Runnymede

The Jurors artwork was commissioned by Surrey County Council and the National Trust to mark the 800th anniversary of the sealing of Magna Carta. The sculptor Hew Locke created 12 bronze chairs each of which is decorated with symbols of past and present struggles for freedom, equality and the rule of law. The artist invites participants to sit, reflect upon and discuss the themes represented. In the image the back of the chair nearest the viewer is a representation of Nelson Mandela's prison cell on Robben Island, South Africa. The portrait seen of the further chair is of Lillie Lenton wearing insignia related to the imprisonment and activism of suffragettes.

The installation was inaugurated at Runnymede by Prince William during the Magna Carta 800th Anniversary celebrations.

=== Writ in Water ===
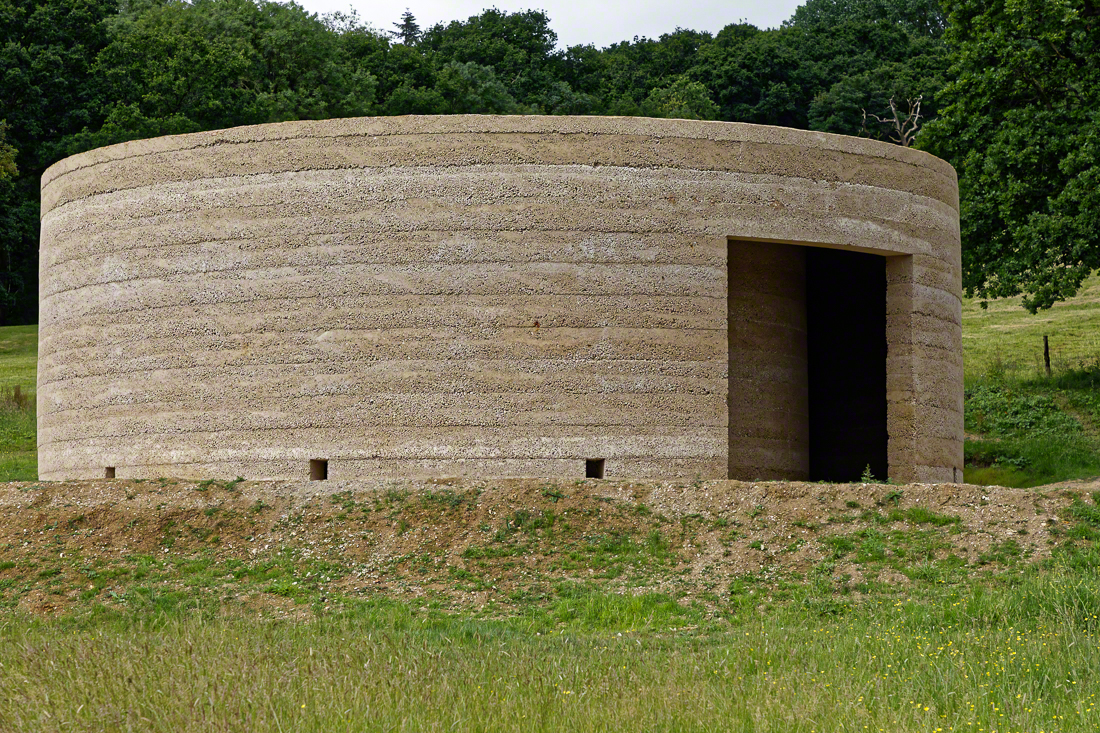
Writ in Water art installation

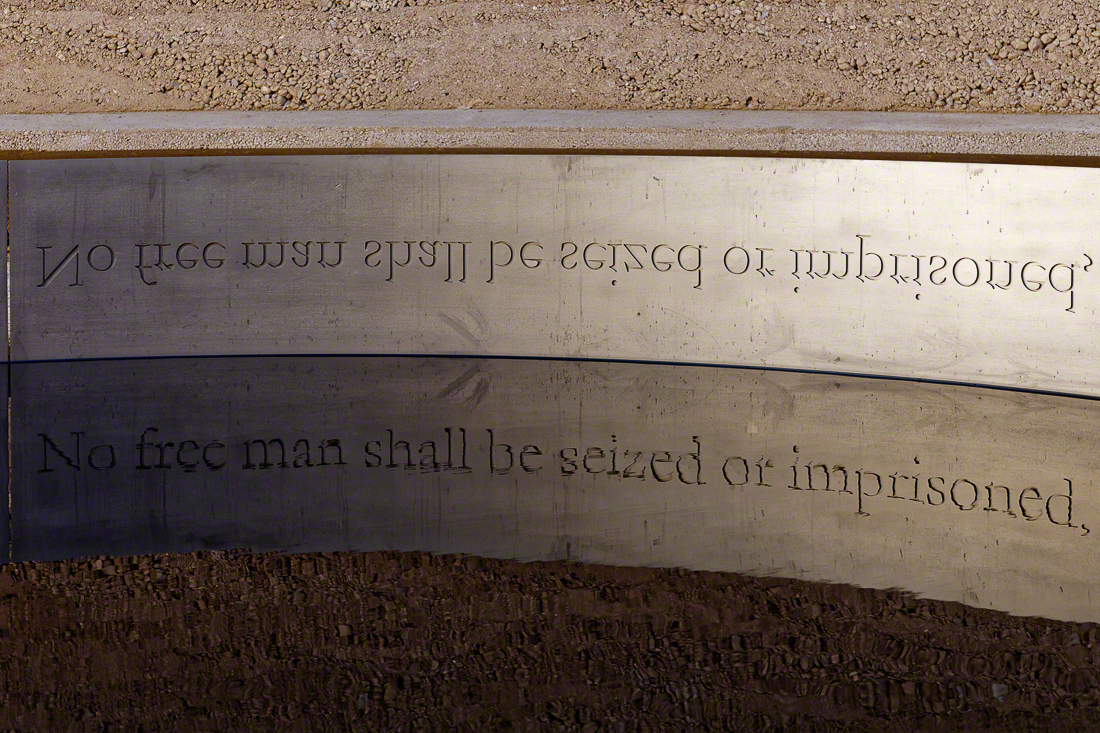
Interior of Writ in Water

Based on Clause 39 of Magna Carta, and inspired perhaps by the inscription on John Keats' grave monument, artist Mark Wallinger designed Writ in Water to celebrate the legacy of Magna Carta. It combines sky, light and water creating a space for reflection both physically and contemplatively. Architects Studio Octopi installed the art work on Coopers Hill Slopes (accessible from Longmede) and it was unveiled on the 803rd anniversary of the sealing of the Great Charter.

=== Cooper's Hill House ===
A large house on Cooper's Hill, overlooking Runnymede and the River Thames, has been at different times: the Royal Indian Engineering College; wartime Post Office headquarters; storage during World War II for the statue of Anteros (popularly known as "Eros") from the Shaftesbury Memorial Fountain, Picadilly Circus, London; an emergency teacher training college; the Shoreditch College of Education (a centre for craft and handiwork education); and most recently, Brunel University's department of design (since relocated to Brunel University's campus in Uxbridge).

=== Ankerwycke Yew ===
The 1,400-year-old-plus Ankerwycke Yew, on the left (east) bank of the river, is also a possible site where Magna Carta may have been sealed. The tree could have been the location of the Witan council and influenced the founding of St Mary's Priory there. This religious site may well have been the preferred neutral meeting place of King John and the barons.

Land development proposals threatening the yew led to action resulting in the tree and surrounding estate passing into the protection of the National Trust in 1998.

Henry VIII is said to have met Anne Boleyn under the tree in the 1530s.

In 1992, botanist and environmental campaigner David Bellamy led a dedication at the yew, stating:

We the free people of the islands of Great Britain on the 777th anniversary of the signing of Magna Carta do: Look back and give thanks for the benefits that the signings, sealing and swearing of oaths on that document handed down to us. Look forward to a new age of freedom through sustainability by granting the following rights to all the sons of plants and animals with which we share our islands and our planet.

There followed ten pledges to sustain all life forms.

== Location and access ==
Runnymede is 20 miles (32 km) west by south-west of the centre of London. The areas held by the National Trust are open 24 hours and seven days a week at no charge. However, parking times on the medes are restricted and additionally carry a charge for non-National Trust visitors.

Runnymede is accessed via the road or river towpath on foot or by bicycle, or by motor vehicle via the A308 road near Egham about 4 miles (6.4 km) southeast of Windsor. Two car parks (on the A308) adjoin the Windsor entrance (these may be closed in winter due to flooding etc.). The car parks near the Old Windsor entrance are managed by the National Trust: they are free for members, but there is a charge for non-members. The car park at the Runnymede Pleasure Ground further along the A308 at the Egham entrance to the medes is managed by Runnymede Borough Council which imposes a sliding scale of charges. Runnymede lies on the Thames Path National Trail. The nearest railway station is Egham. One of the Lutyens lodges at the Windsor entrance to the meadow houses a popular tea room.

The Anckerwycke area on the other bank of the river is accessible from the B376 between Wraysbury and Staines (nearest station Wraysbury).

== Namesakes ==
=== Australia ===
- Runnymede, Queensland, (postcode 4615) – a rural locality near Nanango and Kingaroy.
- Runnymede, Victoria, (postcode 3559) – a rural locality north east of Bendigo.
- Runnymede, Tasmania, (postcode 7190) – a village north of Richmond.
- Runnymede Group Pty Ltd (Company, Sydney Australia)

=== Canada ===
- London, Ontario, Runnymede Crescent
- Toronto, Ontario, Runnymede Road; Runnymede Subway Station, Runnymede Collegiate Institute
- Kingston, Ontario, Runnymede Road
- Victoria, British Columbia: Runnymede Avenue, Runnymede Place
- St. John's, Newfoundland and Labrador: Runnymede Place

=== France ===
- Joinville-le-Pont, Val de Marne, Île de France, France : place de Runnymede

=== India ===
- Udhagamandalam, Tamil Nadu: Runnymede (NMR) Station

=== Spain ===
- Madrid: Runnymede College

=== United States ===
- Runnymede, Harper County, Kansas
- Runnemede, New Jersey
- Runnymede Plantation, Charleston County, South Carolina
- Lake Runnemede, Windsor, Vermont
