= Harry McFarland Bracken =

American philosopher (1926–2011)

Harry McFarland Bracken (March 12, 1926 – December 15, 2011) was an American philosopher, a specialist in Descartes and friend of Noam Chomsky. His academic career was framed in relation to his anti-Vietnam War activism.

Bracken received a BA in philosophy from Trinity College of Connecticut (1949), an MA in philosophy from The Johns Hopkins University (1954), and a PhD in philosophy from University of Iowa (1956). He held the position of assistant professor of philosophy at the University of Iowa (1957–62); Associate Professor of philosophy at University of Minnesota, Minneapolis (1961–63) and then Arizona State University (1963–64); and finally Professor of philosophy at McGill University (1966–91). He was a visiting professor at Trinity College of Dublin; University of California, San Diego; National University of Ireland; Erasmus University of Rotterdam; and University of Groningen in the Netherlands. Bracken nominated Noam Chomsky for the 1969 Nobel Peace Prize.

== Bibliography ==
In addition to many articles and reviews, Bracken's published books are:

- The Early Reception of Berkeley's Immaterialism: 1710–1733, The Hague: Nijhoff, 1959; revised ed., 1963. According to WorldCat, the book is held in 484 libraries
- Berkeley, London: Macmillan, 1974 According to WorldCat, the book is held in 597 libraries
- Mind and Language: Essays on Descartes and Chomsky, Dordrecht: Foris, 1983
- Freedom of Speech: Words Are Not Deeds, Westport CT: Praeger [Greenwood], 1994. According to WorldCat, the book is held in 648 libraries
- Descartes. Oxford: Oneworld, 2002
