= The Jurors =

2015 sculpture by Hew Locke

Coordinates: 51°26′48″N 0°33′59″W

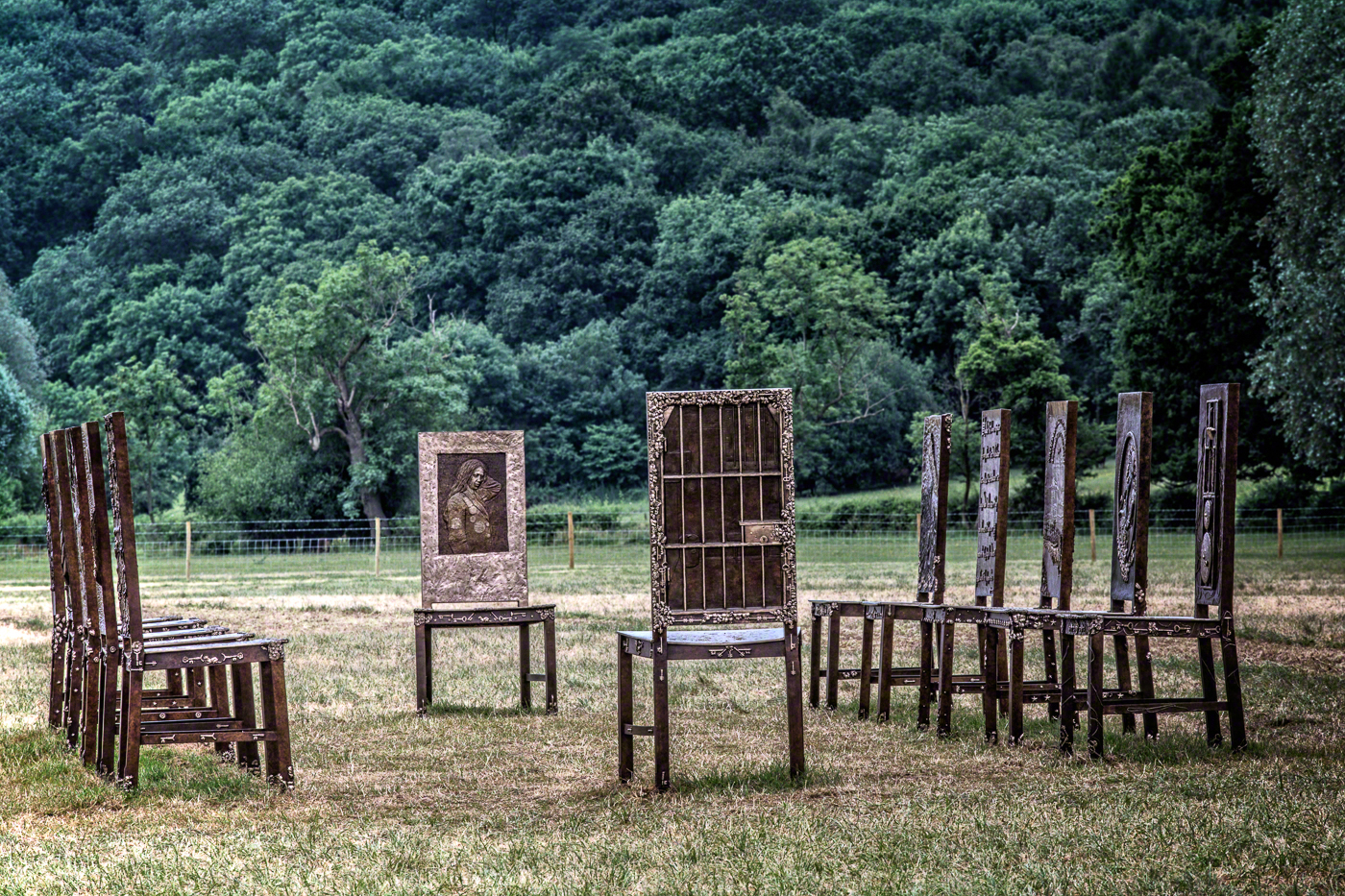
The Jurors: the inside of chair 1 at one end has a portrait of Lillie Lenton, and the outside of chair 7 and the other end shows the door of Nelson Mandela's prison cell, with five other chairs lined up to either side

The Jurors is an artwork by Hew Locke, installed at Runnymede in Surrey in 2015 to commemorate the 800th anniversary of the sealing of Magna Carta.

Commissioned in 2014 by Surrey County Council and the National Trust, it comprises 12 high-backed bronze chairs placed in a grassy meadow, arranged in a rectangular formation to face inwards as if around a table, with one chair at each end and five along each side. Each chair measures 123 cm × 61 cm × 57 cm (48 in × 24 in × 22 in), and the installation covers an area of 4 m × 19 m (13 ft × 62 ft).

The surfaces of each chair are decorated with images and symbols representing freedom, the rule of law, and human rights, clockwise from one end:

Chair	Inside	Outside
1.	Portrait of the suffragette Lillie Lenton	A teacher and pupils in a classroom discussing the United Nations Convention on the Rights of the Child
2.	A representation of the Exxon Valdez oil spill	Cover art for a book of Oscar Wilde's poem The Ballad of Reading Gaol, designed as a prison door
3.	Clause 39 of Magna Carta, no one is to be imprisoned without lawful judgement of his peers	Portrait of the Indian lawyer Cornelia Sorabji
4.	The 1920 Blind March, under the banner "Justice not Charity"	Indigenous land claims, represented by an Amerindian headdress, a forest and a river with gold nuggets
5.	Portrait of an African-American woman commemorating Phillis Wheatley and Mary Prince	1861 emancipation of the Russian serfs, and the Alexander Nevsky Cathedral, Moscow
6.	Portable charkha (spinning wheel) designed by Mahatma Gandhi, and represented on the flag of India	Harvey Milk's loudhailer
7.	Shredding of documents, such as Stasi files	The barred door of Nelson Mandela's prison cell
8.	Two representations of freedom of speech	Portraits representing The Disappeared
9.	Representations of the Golden Rule, with the phrase "do as you would be done by" or "treat others as you would wish to be treated yourself" in 14 languages	Refugees on a boat, and the names of vessels involved in important cases establishing maritime law
10.	Chinese characters for the Confucian principles of Ren, Li, and Yi (humaneness, ritual, and justice)	Hollow boab tree, used to imprison Aboriginal Australians in the 1890s
11.	Ancient Egyptian scales with the head of Maat, goddess of truth and justice and an early personification of Lady Justice, weighing a heart against a feather	The Zong slave ship, with its sails marked with the Adinkra symbols "Epa", of overlapping diamonds symbolising handcuffs, representing captivity, law and justice
12.	The house in Yangon, Burma, where Aung San Suu Kyi was held under house arrest	The xiezhi, a legendary horned creature that is a symbol of justice and law in Chinese mythology

- detailed photos of chairs

The decorations cast into the chairs also include garlands of flowers, as a reference to the Victorian language of flowers, including coltsfoot, black-eyed Susan and horse chestnut for aspects of justice, and hops for injustice; images of ermine as a reference to the traditional robes of English judges; and keys to prison cells, including a key to the Bastille which was given to George Washington by the Marquis de Lafayette in 1790.

Locke deliberately avoided representing a "collection of heroes", and intended his 24 selected scenes to provoke reflection and debate. Locke considers that the artwork is only completed when each chair is occupied by people discussing the issues depicted.

It was dedicated on 15 June 2015, at a ceremony attended by Prince William, Duke of Cambridge. The ceremony included a dramatised performance of the poem "Or In Any Other Way" by Owen Sheers, in which twelve actors emerged from the crowds to recite a stanza each, and then took a place on one of the chairs.

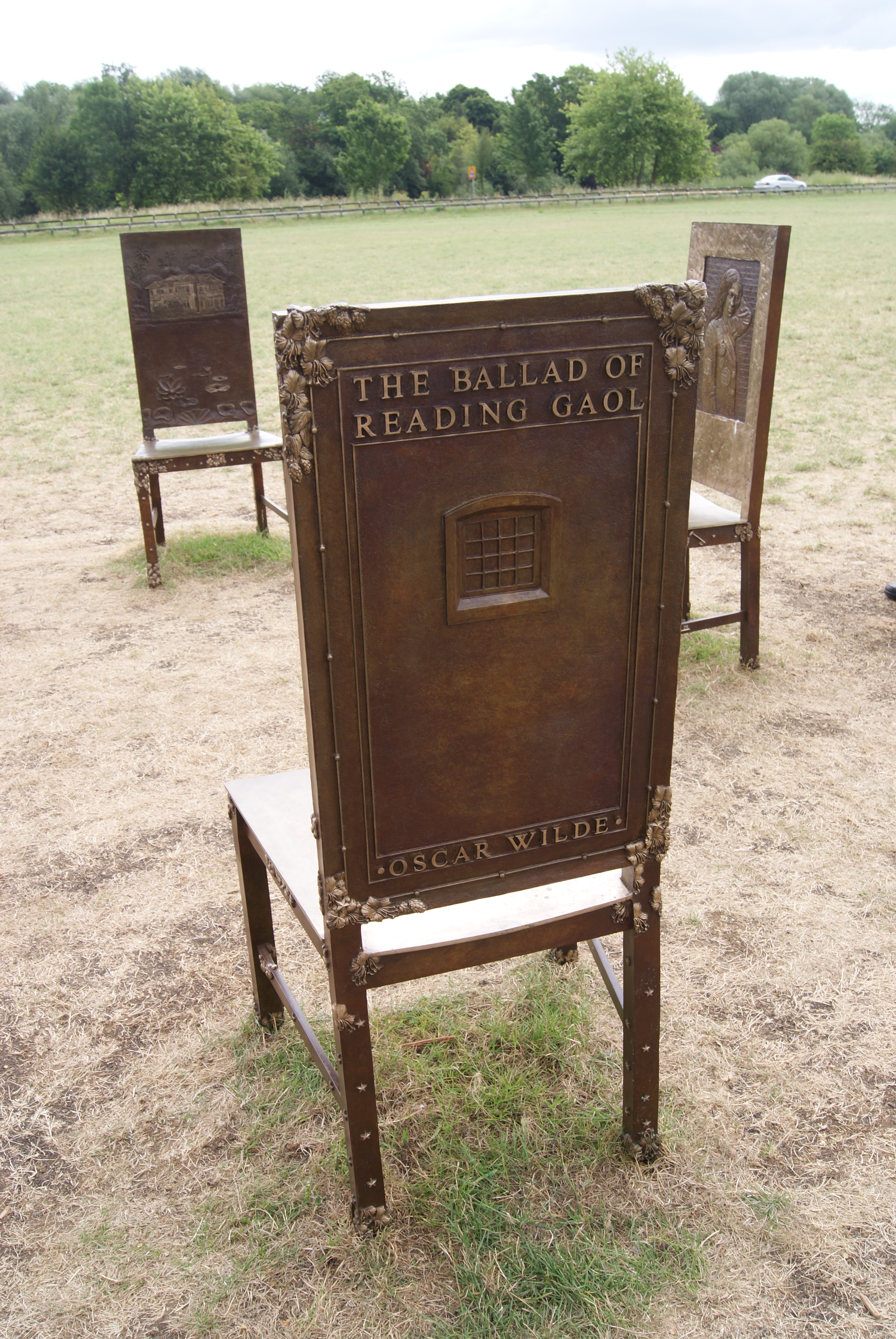
Outside of chair 2, with a prison door as cover art for Oscar Wilde's poem The Ballad of Reading Gaol

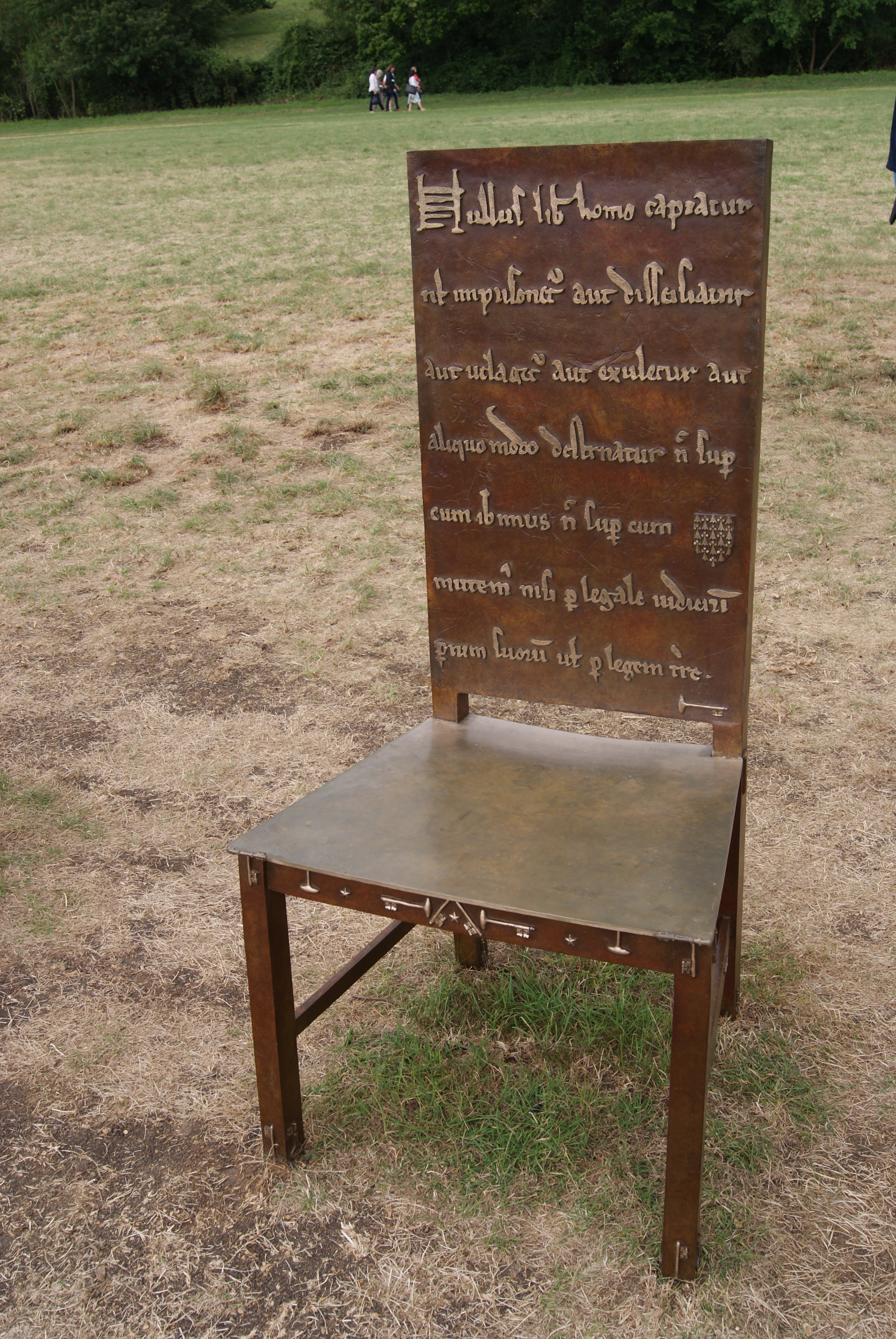
Inside of chair 3, with clause 39 of Magna Carta,

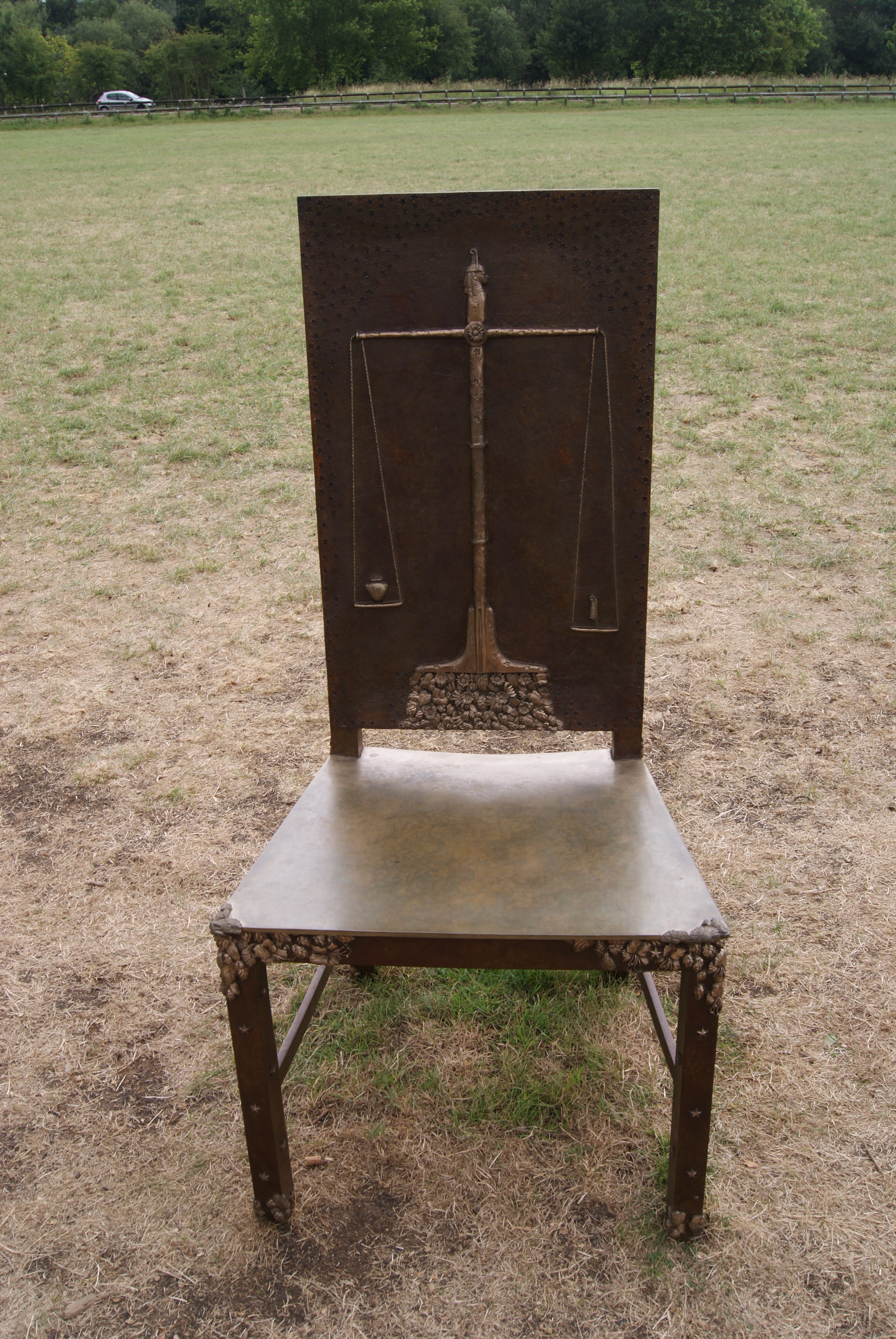
Inside of chair 11, with the scales of Maat
