= Hew Locke =

British sculptor (born 1959)

Hew Locke OBE RA
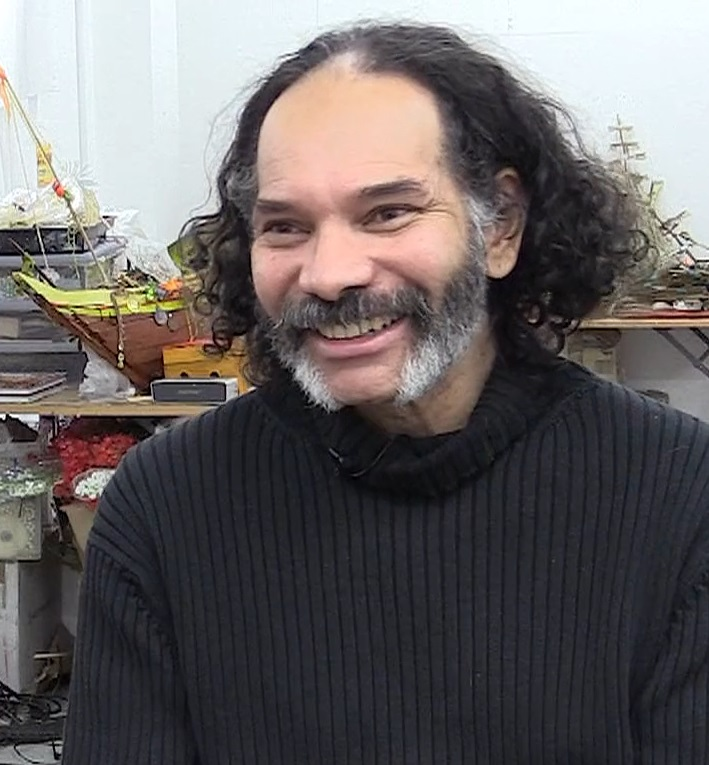
- Locke in 2019
- Born: 13 October 1959 (age 67); Edinburgh, Scotland
- Education: Falmouth University; Royal College of Art
- Occupation: Visual artist
- Known for: Sculpture
- Website: www.hewlocke.net

Hew Donald Joseph Locke (born 13 October 1959) is a British sculptor and contemporary visual artist based in Brixton, London. In 2000, he won a Paul Hamlyn Award and the EASTinternational Award. He grew up in Guyana, but has lived most of his adult life in London.

In 2010, he was shortlisted for the Fourth plinth, Trafalgar Square, London. In 2015, Prince William, Duke of Cambridge dedicated Locke's public sculpture The Jurors, commissioned to commemorate 800 years since the signing of Magna Carta. In 2026 his permanent series of sculptures "Cargoes" was opened to the public in King Edward Memorial Park, London, consisting of 6 bronze boats illustrating the history of the Thames and the local community.

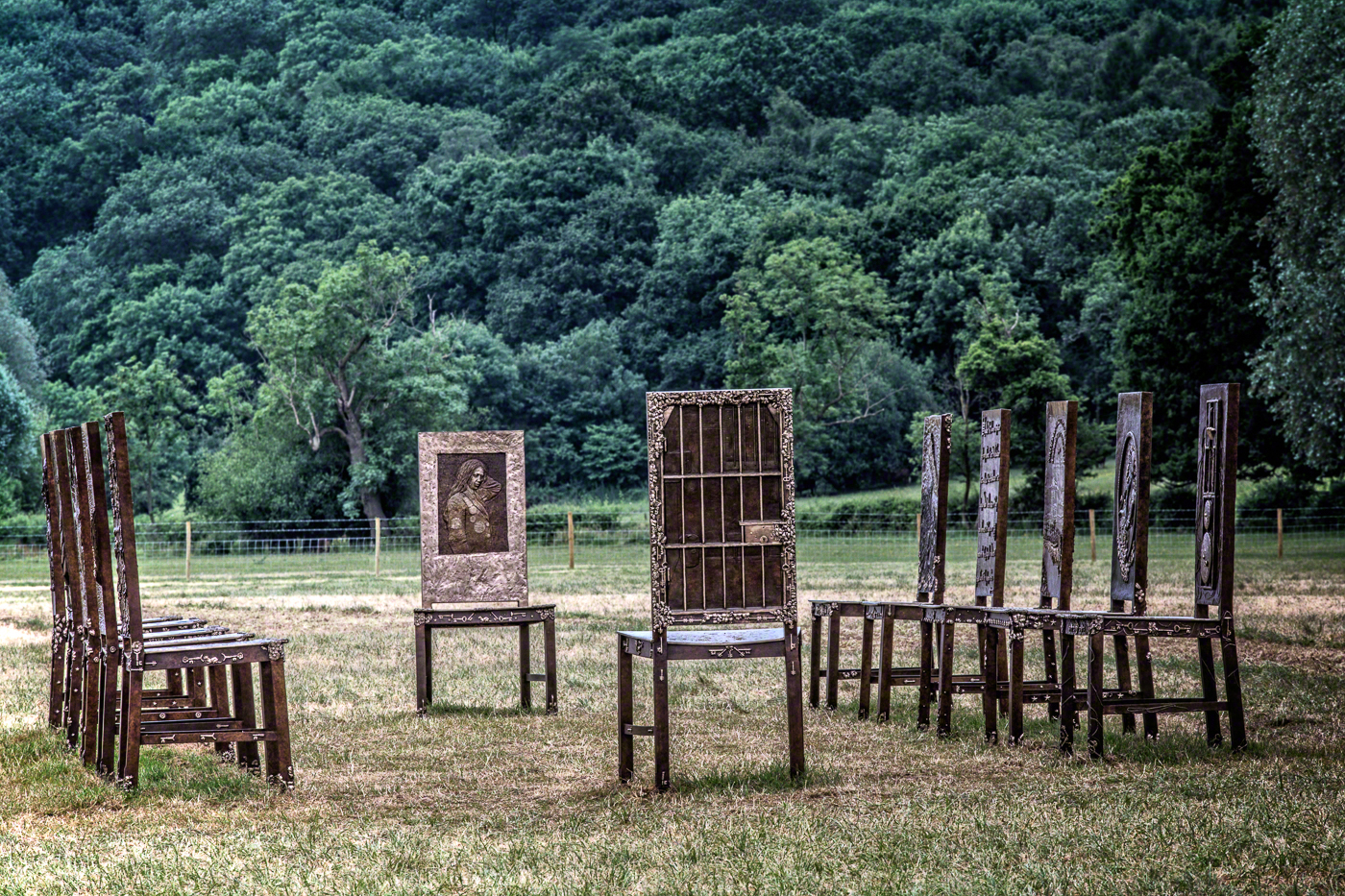
The Jurors art installation at Runnymede

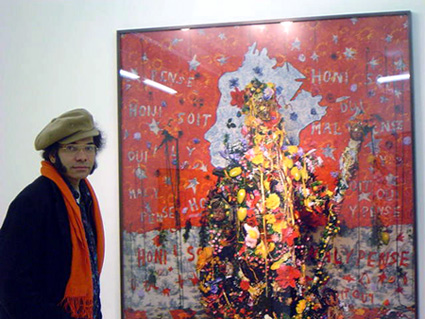
Locke beside his artwork "Saturn" from his series of photographs How Do You Want Me? (portrait by Pam Winfield, 2008)

Locke has had several solo exhibitions in the UK and USA, and is regularly included in international exhibitions and Biennales. His works have been acquired by collections such as Pérez Art Museum Miami (PAMM), Florida, The Tate gallery, London and The Metropolitan Museum of Art, New York. In 2016, the National Portrait Gallery in London acquired a portrait of Locke by Nicholas Sinclair. In 2022, he became a member of The Royal Academy of Arts.

He was appointed Officer of the Order of the British Empire (OBE) in the 2023 Birthday Honours for services to art. In 2024, he was awarded an Honorary Doctorate by Edinburgh University.. In 2025 he was named Apollo Magazine's Artist of the Year.

== Background ==
Born in Edinburgh, Scotland, in 1959, Locke is the eldest son of Guyanese sculptor Donald Locke (1930–2010) and British painter Leila Locke (née Chaplin) (1936–1992). He spent his formative years (1966 to 1980) in Georgetown, Guyana, before returning to the UK to study. He received a B.A. Fine Art degree in 1988 from Falmouth University, and an M.A. in Sculpture from the Royal College of Art, London, in 1994. In 1995 he married curator Indra Khanna.

== Work and themes ==
Prof. Dr. Ingrid von Rosenberg has written: "(Black) Artists who continue to produce work with a critical message, like Yinka Shonibare and Hew Locke, avoid the open confrontation typical of the 1980s and instead use humour and satire, positioning themselves as cultural insiders, rather than excluded outsiders."

He has cited architecture ranging from the Baroque, Rajput, Islamic, and Caribbean vernacular to Victorian funfairs as influences. Locke uses a wide range of media, makes extensive use of found objects, and his recurrent themes include cardboard, royalty, public statues, boats, finance and trade.

=== Cardboard ===
Locke has said about misreadings of his work in his early career: "I would make a sculpture and people would think it was made for some festival....It was seen as being from a folk tradition, not as being of its own tradition, true to itself – as art basically...I stopped making work in colour for three years, I just dropped it."

Curator Kris Kuramitsu wrote: "Frustrated by the fact that his biography so heavily over-determines the reading of his work, he created a series of sculptures in which he used cardboard to preemptively package the work for the viewer. This move was revelatory for Locke's practice, as through this material he could metonymically address migration, international economics, globalisation and ideas about personal and cultural protection and projection."

=== Royalty ===
His ongoing series House of Windsor consists of portraits of members of the British royal family.

He has said: "People ask me why I'm working on pictures of the royal family....They expect me to be angry, but I don't see the point. If you're going to fight in Iraq, then you're going to fight for Queen and Country. When you hand in your passport, you see that you are in fact a subject of the Queen. My work is a weird kind of acceptance of that situation."

"My feelings about the Royal Family are ambivalent. I am simply fascinated by the institution and its relationship to the press and public. My political position is neither republican nor monarchist."

=== Statues ===
In an interview with Simon Grant, Locke said: "...the legacy of empire is all around us on a daily basis – not just the variety of ethnic backgrounds that we have living in the UK, but the buildings and public statues that you see in cities across the country that came into being out of the economy of empire."

Locke often works over photographs of specific statues, covering areas with painted or collaged designs. The press release for his work Restoration describes "Hew Locke’s embellishment, directly on to the photographic print, interrupts our expectation that the surface of the photographic image should be left pristine. We can only guess at what lies beneath ...It is perhaps the image of Colston that is most haunting. He is adorned with cowrie shells and other trade beads ... we are made aware of his ... involvement in the uncomfortable truths of corrupt African Kingdoms selling their people ... Locke views this work as an act of 'mindful vandalism', an exploration of these characters who he finds both attractive and repellent."

Locke said: "When travelling around Britain, the first things I'm looking for are the statues ... I often think 'why have they got a statue to this person and why to that person?' ... On a purely aesthetic level I often find these historical monuments beautiful and have a genuine respect for their skilled academic sculptors. I have a somewhat schizophrenic response. It is not an anti-military critique, but an investigation into the idea of the Hero, and a meditation on our relationship with monumental public sculpture."

=== Boats ===
Ships have been a constant theme in his work throughout his career, ranging from small paintings to installations filling a church nave or an installation across an entire battle ship. A major example of Locke's interest in navigational vessels in visual arts is his 2011 installation For Those in Peril on the Sea, acquired by the Pérez Art Museum Miami.

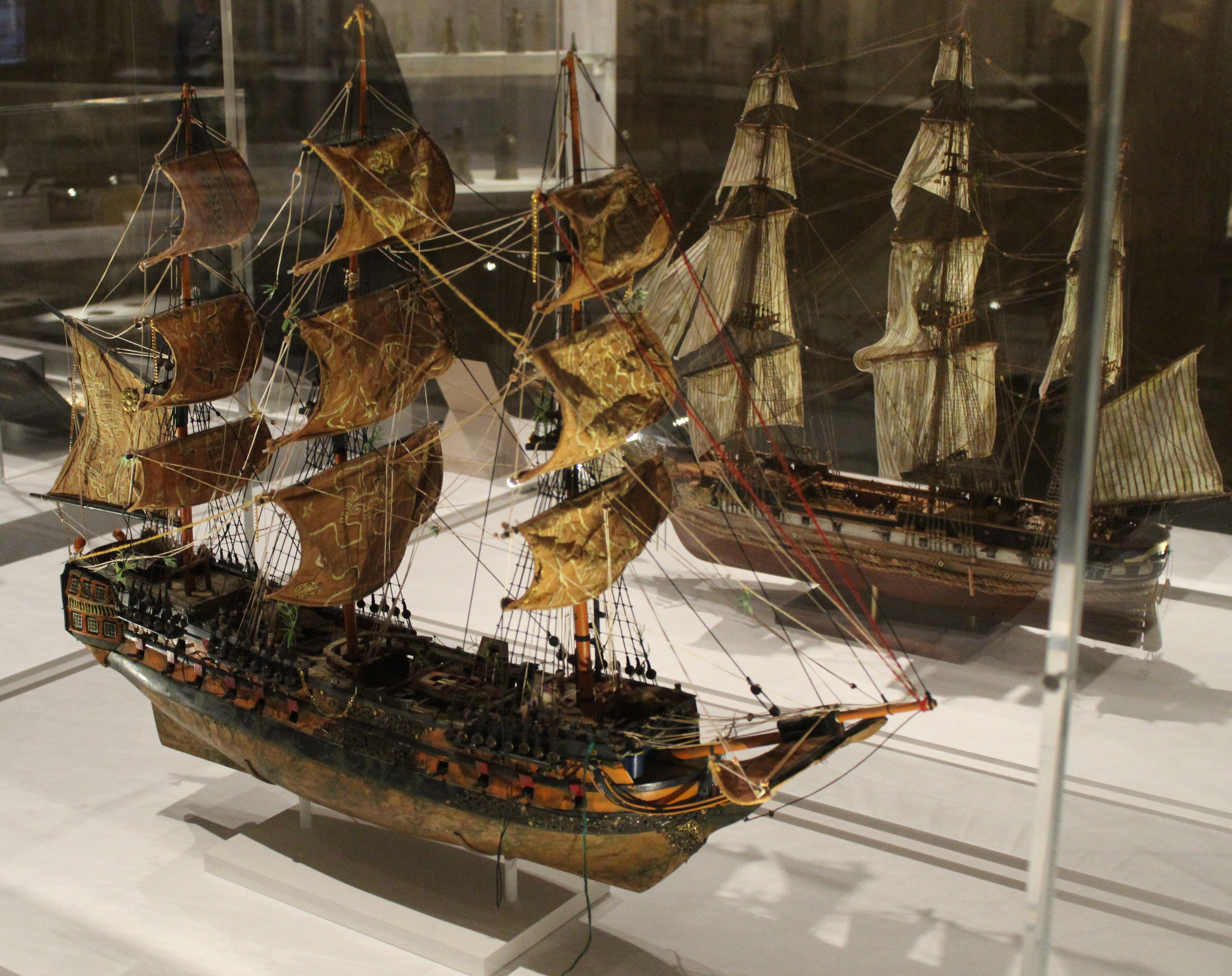
Armada 6 and Windward (2019) by Locke

He has said: "I have a deep personal compulsion to make at least one boat every two years or so. It is part of my personal history, having sailed to and from Guyana to England as a child."

Curator Zoe Lukov has written: "Locke offers us a maritime procession – at once celebratory and funereal – that is animated by the sub-marine pulse of history...a synthesis of symbols from intertwined historical and cultural legends and narratives...disparate legacies that surf the waves."

Locke described his 2019 mixed-media installation Armada, made up of 45 boat sculptures, as addressing the reality that "today's refugee is tomorrow's citizen".

=== Finance and trade ===
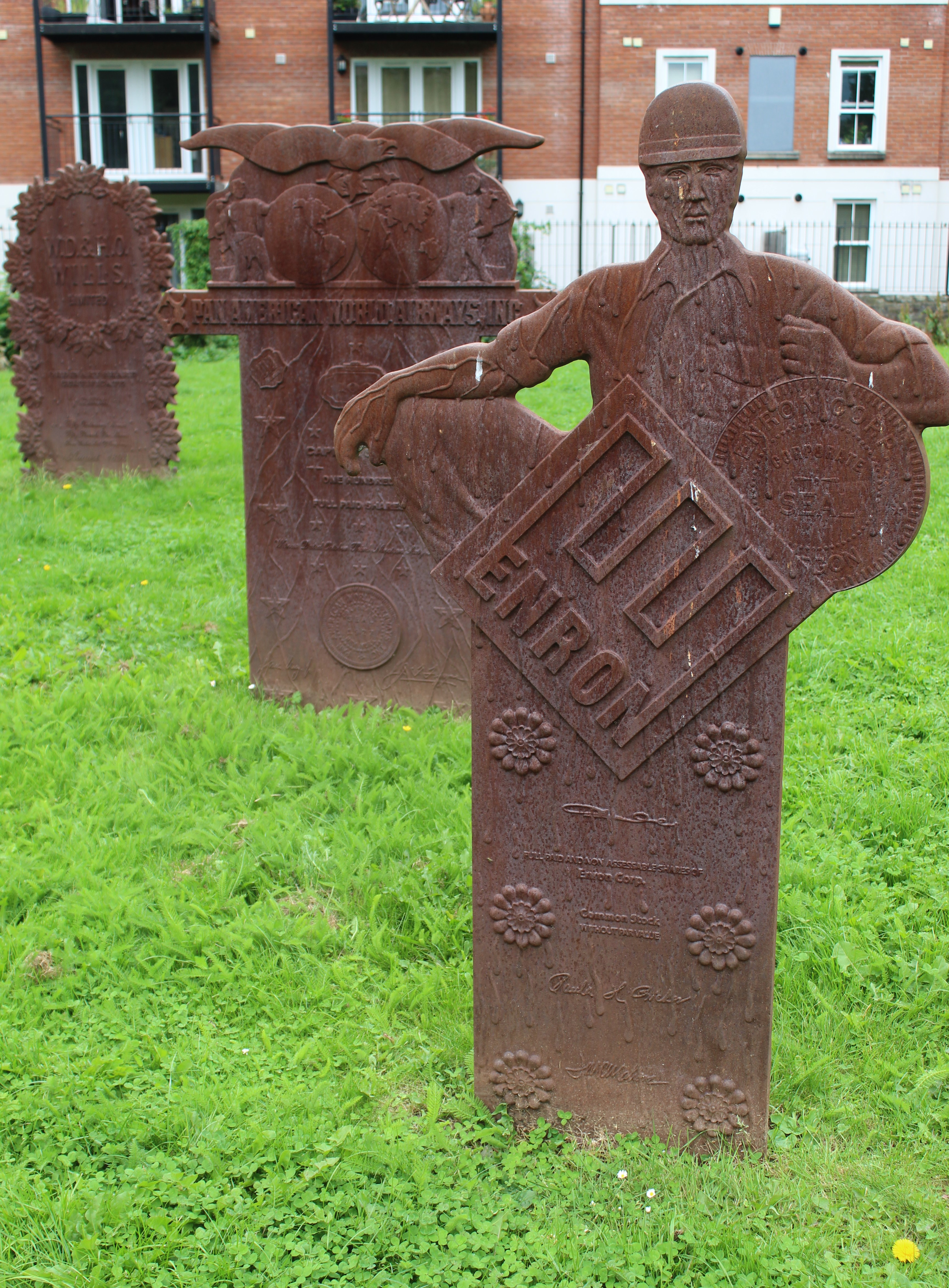
Ruined (2010), Brunswick Cemetery Gardens, Bristol. Ten cast-iron grave markers, each with symbols and images of a failed capitalist venture or financial scandal

Curator Amanda Sanfilippo of Fringe Projects, Miami, wrote that Locke "utilizes share certificates ... to embody the history and global movement of money, power and ownership. Since the financial crash of 2008, Hew Locke has been acquiring original antique share certificates and applying paint to their surfaces. Locke ... often highlights historical and economic cycles, the machinations of global currency and exchange. ... Figures representative of the local population in the areas in which the companies operated are sometimes seen breaking-through. These are silent witnesses, those who paid the most to create the wealth without receiving the benefit...This work... is also a wry acknowledgement of the commodity value of contemporary art."

Art Daily reported that his 2017 work Cui Bono "refers to the wealth that maritime trade brought to Bremen’s merchants. The search for wealth, violent conquest and a desire for safety are factors that for centuries have driven the global movement of people...(it) is a post-colonial incentive to grapple with Bremen's maritime commercial and colonial history."

== Selected solo exhibitions and presentations ==
- 2000: Hemmed In Two, The Victoria and Albert Museum, London
- 2002: The Cardboard Palace, Chisenhale Gallery, London
- 2004: House of Cards, Luckman Gallery, California State Uni & Atlanta Contemporary Art Center, USA
- 2004: King Creole, installation on facade of Tate Britain & at BBC New Media Village, London
- 2005: Hew Locke, The New Art Gallery, Walsall
- 2006: Restoration, St Thomas the Martyr's Church, Bristol
- 2008: The Kingdom of the Blind, Rivington Place, London
- 2011: For Those in Peril on the Sea, St. Mary & St. Eanswythe church, Folkestone Triennial
- 2015: The Tourists, HMS Belfast, London
- 2018: Hew Locke: For Those in Peril on the Sea, Pérez Art Museum Miami, Florida
- 2019: Hew Locke; Here's the Thing, Ikon Gallery, Birmingham, Kemper Museum of Contemporary Art in Kansas City & Colby College Museum of Art in Maine
- 2022: The Procession, Duveen Hall Commission, Tate Britain, London
- 2022: Foreign Exchange, temporary public sculpture co-inciding with The Commonwealth Games, Birmingham, UK
- 2022: Gilt, Facade Commission at The Metropolitan Museum of Art, New York
- 2024: Hew Locke: The Procession, ICA Watershed at the Institute of Contemporary Art, Boston, MA
- 2024: Hew Locke: What have we here?, British Museum, London
- 2025: Hew Locke: Passages, Yale Centre for British Art in New Haven, Wexner Center for the Arts in Columbus OH & The Museum of Fine Arts in Houston

== Monographs ==
- Hew Locke, Walsall, UK: The New Art Gallery Walsall, 2005, ISBN 0-946652-77-5
- How Do You Want Me?, Paris, France: Editions Janninck, 2009, ISBN 978-2-916067-41-4
- Stranger in Paradise, London, UK: Black Dog, 2011, ISBN 978-1-907317-38-5
- Here's the Thing, Birmingham, UK: Ikon Gallery, Kemper Museum of Contemporary Art & Colby College Museum of Art, 2019, ISBN 978-1911155218
- Hew Locke: What have we here?, London, UK: The British Museum Press, 2024, ISBN 978-0-714123509
- Hew Locke: Passages, London, UK: Yale University Press, 2025, ISBN 9780300284683
