= Charles S. Rhyne =

American lawyer who argued landmark case Baker v. Carr

- Born: Charles Sylvanus Rhyne; 23 June 1912 near Charlotte, North Carolina, U.S.
- Died: 27 July 2003 (aged 91); McLean, Virginia, U.S.
- Education: Duke University; George Washington University
- Occupation: Lawyer
- Known for: Baker v. Carr
- Spouse(s): Sue M. Cotton (d. 1974); Sarah P. Hendon
- Children: 4

Charles Sylvanus Rhyne (23 June 1912 – 27 July 2003) was an American lawyer whose arguments before the Supreme Court of the United States led to the landmark 1962 decision in Baker v. Carr.

== Early life ==
Rhyne was born on a cotton farm near Charlotte, North Carolina. He attended Duke University and its law school, where befriended classmate and future president Richard Nixon. Rhyne completed his legal education at George Washington University in Washington, D.C.. Before his legal career, he worked as a cowboy and prizefighter during the Great Depression.

== Legal career ==
Rhyne opened a law office in Washington, D.C. in 1937, developing a practice that focussed on aeronautical and municipal law. He became president of the Bar Association of the District of Columbia in 1955 and promoted its racial integration. In 1958, Rhyne was elected president of the American Bar Association, where he initiated the annual celebration of Law Day on May 1, in recognition of which he was on the cover of Time Magazine on May 5, 1958.

== Baker v. Carr ==
Rhyne played a central role in the landmark Baker v. Carr case, which transformed American electoral law. In the late 1950s, a group of urban voters in Tennessee challenged the state’s failure to redraw its legislative districts. The electoral boundaries of the districts had not changed since 1901 despite significant population growth in cities. Rhyne, then general counsel to the National Institute of Municipal Law Officers, agreed to represent them in their case against Tennessee Secretary of State Joseph Carr.

Arguing that the outdated apportionment diluted urban votes and violated the Fourteenth Amendment’s equal protection clause, Rhyne persuaded the Supreme Court to hear the case in 1961. On 26 March 1962, the Court ruled 6–2 in favor of the plaintiffs, establishing that federal courts had jurisdiction over redistricting disputes, establishing the "one man, one vote" doctrine in American law. This decision led to widespread redrawing of electoral maps in the United States.

The then Chief Justice Earl Warren described the decision as one of the most significant of his tenure.

== Later life and death ==
In the 1970s, Rhyne served as President Nixon’s special ambassador to the United Nations High Commissioner for Refugees and later represented Rose Mary Woods during the Watergate scandal. He married Sue M. Cotton in 1932. After her death in 1974, he married Sarah P. Hendon. He died on 27 July 2003 at his home in McLean, Virginia, as a result of an accidental drowning.

== See also ==
- List of covers of Time magazine (May 5, 1958)
- 1967 Nobel Peace Prize nominations
