= Rolf Danielsen =

Norwegian educator, author and historian (1922–2002)

Rolf Danielsen (19 October 1922 – 25 April 2002) was a Norwegian educator, author and historian.

He was born in Hammerfest in Finnmark, Norway. He was awarded his cand.philol. from the University of Oslo (1950). Danielsen subsequently worked at the University of Oslo (1950-1951) and University of Gothenburg (1963-1964). He was a professor of modern history at the University of Bergen from 1968 to 1991.

His thesis was a study on the Parliament of Norway (Tidsrommet 1870–1908. Det Norske Storting gjennom 150 år. Vol. 2.). He has written volume four of the History of Trondheim. He was a board member of The Research Council of Norway (Norges almenvitenskapelige forskningsråd) from 1973 to 1975.
