= Paul Guggenheim =

Swiss legal scholar

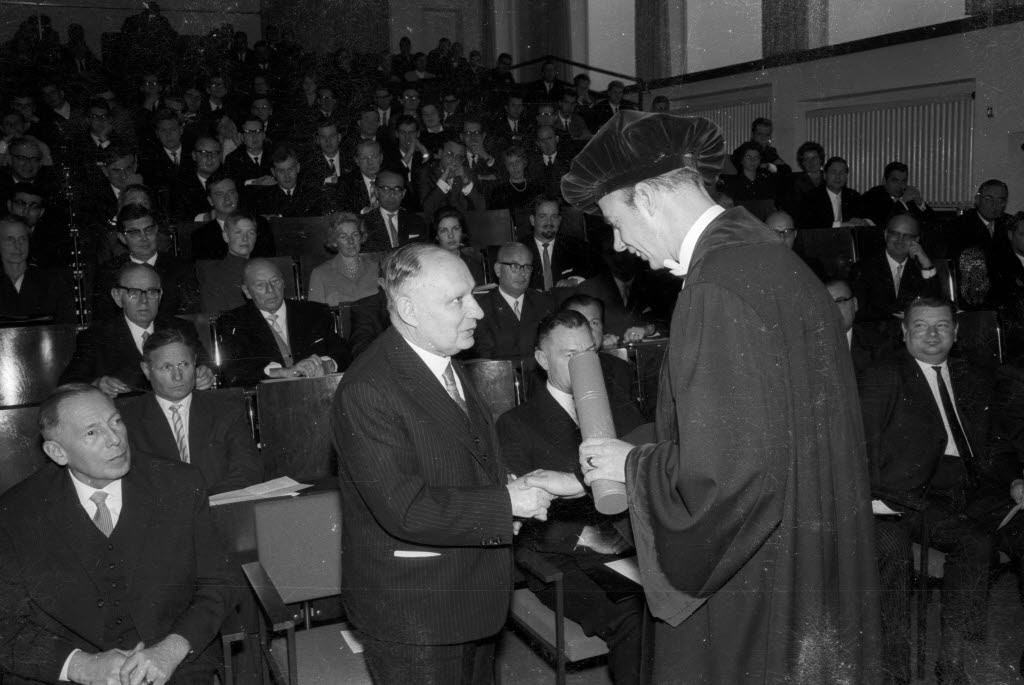
Paul Guggenheim being awarded an honorary doctorate by Christian-Friedrich Menger, Christian-Albrechts-Universität, 1964. Seated at left is Helmut Lemke, Minister President of Schleswig-Holstein

Paul Guggenheim (15 September 1899 – 31 August 1977) was a Swiss scholar of international law.

He studied law at the universities of Zurich, Geneva, Rome and Berlin. After his promotion in 1924, he briefly taught international law in Kiel in 1927, and achieved habilitation in 1928. From 1932 to 1958 he taught in The Hague. From 1952 on, he was a judge at the Permanent Court of Arbitration in The Hague, and once ad hoc judge at the International Court of Justice. From 1941 to 1969 he taught at the Graduate Institute of International Studies in Geneva.

He was named an honorary member of the American Society of International Law in 1963, and received its Manley Ottmer Hudson medal in 1970.

== Principal works ==
- Lehrbuch des Völkerrechts unter Berücksichtigung der internationalen und schweizerischen Praxis. 2 Bde., Verlag für Recht und Gesellschaft, Basel 1948–1951
- Traité de droit international public. 2 Bde., Georg, Genf 1953 f.
