= D. F. Fleming =

American historian

Denna Frank Fleming (1893–1980) was an American historian and political scientist, who is best known for his work The Cold War and Its Origins.

== Early life and education ==
He was born in Paris, Illinois, on March 25, 1893, the son of Albert and Eleanor McCormick Fleming. He received his MA and PhD from the University of Illinois.

For almost eight years, between 1939 and 1947, Fleming hosted a weekly radio show on WSM, where he covered current events and politics. The scripts for these broadcasts were later compiled into Fleming's 1944 book While America Slept.

== Works ==
- The Treaty Veto of the American Senate, 1930
- The United States and the League of Nations, 1918-1920, 1932
- The United States and World Organization, 1920-1933, 1938
- Can We Win the Peace, 1943
- While America Slept, 1944
- The United States and the World Court, 1945
- The Cold War and Its Origins, Vol I, 1917-1950, 1961
- The Cold War and Its Origins, Vol II, 1950-1960, 1961
- The Origins and Legacies of World War I, 1968
- America's role in Asia, 1969
- The Issues of Survival, 1972
