= Alf Kaartvedt =

Norwegian historian (1921–2013)

Alf Kaartvedt (2 March 1921 – 24 August 2013) was a Norwegian historian. He was born in Bergen. He held the dr.philos. degree and was Professor of History at the University of Bergen from 1957 to his retirement in 1988. He was a fellow of the Norwegian Academy of Science and Letters.

He was a specialist on Norwegian history around 1900, with titles including Kongeriket Norges Hypotekbank 1852–1952 (1952), Kampen mot parlamentarisme 1880–84 (1956), volume one of Stortingets historie (1964) and volume one of Høyres historie (1984), the history of the Conservative Party.
