= Dominique Pire =

Belgian Dominican friar (1910–1969)

Dominique Pire O.P.
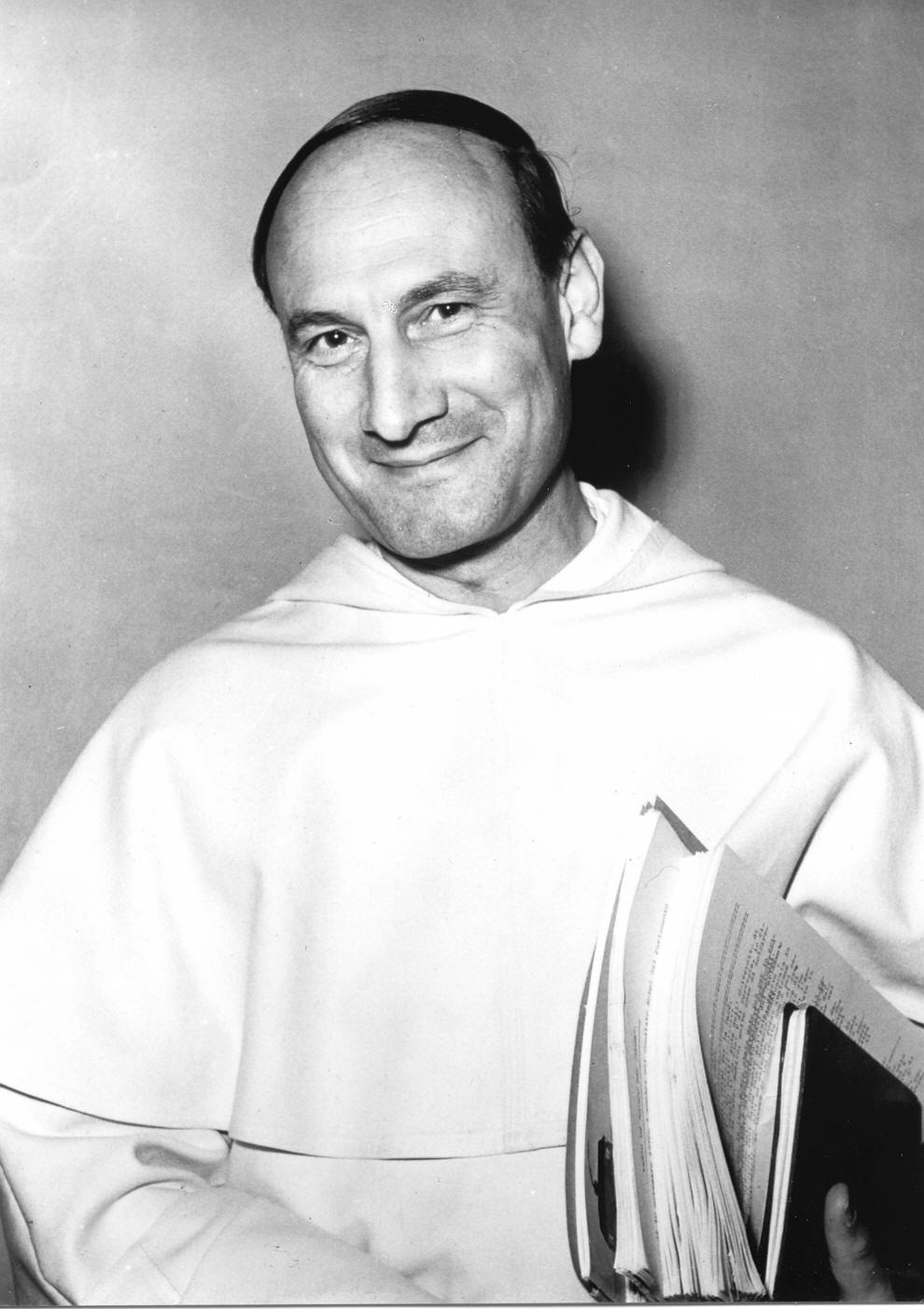
- Pire in 1958
- Born: Georges Charles Clement Ghislain Pire; 10 February 1910; Dinant, Belgium
- Died: 30 January 1969 (aged 58); Herent, Belgium
- Education: Pontifical University of St. Thomas Aquinas (Angelicum) (1934–1936), Catholic University of Leuven (1936–1937)

Dominique Pire, O.P. (born Georges Charles Clement Ghislain Pire; 10 February 1910 – 30 January 1969) was a Belgian Dominican friar whose work helping refugees in post-World War II Europe saw him receive the Nobel Peace Prize in 1958. Pire delivered his Nobel lecture, entitled Brotherly Love: Foundation of Peace, in December 1958.

== Early biography ==
Pire was born in Dinant, Belgium. He was the eldest child of four born to Georges Pire Sr., a civic official, and Berthe (Ravet) Pire.

At the outbreak of the First World War in 1914, Pire's family fled from Belgium to France in a boat to escape advancing German troops. After the armistice of 1918, the family was able to return to Dinant, which had been reduced to ruins.

== Education ==
Pire studied Classics and Philosophy at the Collège de Bellevue and at the age of eighteen entered the Dominican priory of La Sarte in Huy. He took his final vows on 23 September 1932, adopting the name Dominique, after the Order's founder. He then studied theology and social science at the Pontifical International Institute Angelicum, the future Pontifical University of Saint Thomas Aquinas, Angelicum in Rome, where he obtained his doctorate in theology in 1936 with a thesis entitled L'Apatheia ou insensibilité irréalisable et destructrice (Apatheia or unrealisable and destructive insensitivity). He then returned to the Studium of La Sarte where he taught sociology.

== Career ==
After completing his studies, Pire returned to the priory at La Sarte, in Huy, Belgium, where he dedicated himself to helping poor families live according to their dignity. During the second world war, Pire served as chaplain to the Belgian resistance, actively participating in its activities, such as helping smuggle Allied pilots out of the country. He received several medals for this service after the war.

In 1949, he began studying issues relating to postwar refugees (displaced persons) and wrote a book about them, entitled Du Rhin au Danube avec 60,000 D. P.. He founded an organisation to help them. The organisation established sponsorships for refugee families, and during the 1950s built a number of villages in Austria and Germany to help house many refugees. Although a Dominican friar, Dominique Pire always refused to mix his personal faith with his commitments on behalf of the disadvantaged, a decision that was not always understood by his religious superiors.

After winning the Peace Prize, Pire also helped found a "Peace University" to raise global understanding. Later convinced that peace would not be achievable without the eradication of poverty, he founded "Islands of Peace", an NGO dedicated to the long term development of rural populations in developing countries. Projects were started in Bangladesh and India.

Pire died at Louvain Roman Catholic Hospital in Herent on 30 January 1969 from complications following prostate surgery, at age 58.

More than 30 years after his death, the four organizations he founded are still active. In 2008 a program was established in honour of his work at the Las Casas Institute at Blackfriars Hall, University of Oxford.

== Organizations founded ==
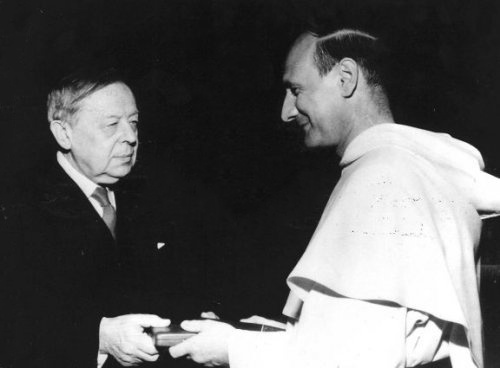
Pire receives the Nobel Prize for Peace 1958 from Gunnar Jahn, Chairman of the Nobel Committee, at the University of Oslo.

- Service d'Entraide Familiale: works towards the social re-insertion of persons in state of difficulty,
- Aide aux Personnes Déplacées: is active in the field of refugees in Belgium and sponsors children in developing countries,
- Université de Paix: specializes in conflict prevention in the family and work place,
- Islands of Peace: conducts long term development projects with the populations of Burkina Faso, Benin, Mali, Guinea Bissau, Ecuador, Bolivia and Peru.
