= Islands of Peace =

Islands of Peace is a Belgian non-governmental organization which works for development. It was founded by Dominique Pire, a Belgian Dominican who won the Nobel Peace Prize in 1958. Its head office is located in Huy, Belgium.

Islands of Peace is also a nickname for a region and archipelago in the south of Finland named Åland, an autonomous and demilitarised region since 1920 by a decision of the League of Nations.

== History ==
"Islands of Peace" is the name given to a charity project founded in 1962, three years after a field experiment showed the efficacy of Dominique Pire's project: consideration of an interaction between peace and development, a strategy based upon "self help", the willing co-operation of the population, and an experiment-based approach with thorough technical and methodological support.

The societal integration of Islands of Peace was first possible thanks to wide support for Dominique Pire's socio-economic (Service d'Entraide Familiale, Aide aux Personnes Déplacées, Iles de Paix) and educational initiatives (Université de Paix), in Europe and some countries of the Third World.

== Principal aims ==
The approach of Islands of Peace can be explained by the well-known sentence: Agir sans savoir est une imprudence, savoir sans agir est une lâcheté, which literally means: To act without knowledge is imprudent and to know and do nothing is cowardice. According to Islands of Peace, each human being has to be master of their own destiny and the one mainly responsible for their development. Islands of Peace wish to give the possibility to all people, from North as well as South, to be active in and responsible for the improvement of living conditions, depending on their own circumstances and capabilities.

== Countries ==
Stand-alone projects :

- Bangladesh: Gohira (2005-2008)
- India: Kalakad (1968-1975)
- Mali: Tombouctou (1975-1994)
- Burkina Faso: Yalogo (1982-1999), Tansobentenga (2001-2011)
- Guinea-Bissau: Bolama (1986-2003)
- Bolivia: Sacaca (2001-2003)
- Ecuador: Pangor (1995), Pallatanga and Molleturo

Current projects:

- Burkina Faso: Yamba (2002), Diapangou (2004) and Tibga-Diabo-Baskouré-Gounghin (2014)
- Benin: Toucountouna (2000) and Matéri - Cobly - Boukoumbé (2014)
- Mali: Bénéna (2007) and Fangasso (2008)
- Peru: Molino (2008), Santa Maria del Valle (2009) and Umari (2012)

== Archives ==
About 40 metres of the State Archives in Namur hold the archives of Dominique Pire, from the 1930s to the 1970s. The non-profit associations Service d’Entraide Familiale, Aide aux Personnes déplacées, Université de Paix and Les Amis des Îles de Paix et de l’Action Pain de la Paix signed a statement in January 2016 which stipulated the donation of the archives of Père Dominique Pire to the State Archives in Namur.
