= The IU =

Georgist political organization

the IU
- Founded: 1926
- Location: London, United Kingdom
- Website: http://www.theiu.org

The IU, in full the International Union for Land Value Taxation, (Note: The IU is the popular name of the International Union for Land Value Taxation and Free Trade, officially also known as the International Union for Land Value Taxation, and the International Georgist Union; and colloquially as The International Union.) is an international umbrella organisation for land value tax reformers. It has members in countries around the world – activists, politicians, professionals and academics, and is affiliated with national and local organisations. The IU enjoys Special Consultative Status at the United Nations.

== Principles ==
The objectives of the IU are "to stimulate in all countries a public opinion favourable to permanent peace and prosperity for all people, through the progressive removal of the basic economic causes of poverty and war". The IU's work is guided by principles of equal freedom and sharing of common resources of community and nature – ideas which were set out in the writings of the 19th-century American reformer Henry George. Specifically, towards the realisation of its objectives, the IU "favours the raising of public revenues by public collection of the rental value of land apart from improvements"; and, further, favours "the abolition of taxes, tariffs, or imposts of every sort that interfere with the free production and exchange of wealth". Following from those principles, the IU advances a radical land and fiscal reform agenda and 'real' free trade, which would not privilege Western corporate interests. The principal policies advocated by the IU are the public collection of 'resource rents' and land value taxation, in lieu of traditional taxation.

== Organisation ==
The IU is governed by an executive committee of officers including vice-presidents from each sovereign state with significant representation within the membership, and other members. The IU is funded mainly by members' subscriptions, donations and legacies. The IU's work is supported by voluntary effort.

== History ==
The IU was founded at an international conference held in Denmark in 1926. The conference was attended by some 500 delegates, all advocates of the ideas of Henry George. In 1992 the IU was accredited to the United Nations as a Non-Governmental Organization (NGO). In 2003 it was granted Special Consultative Status by the UN's Economic and Social Council (ECOSOC), which widened the scope of its engagement and influence in United Nations' processes. The IU retains 12 UN representatives who serve the world organisation's offices in New York, Geneva, Addis Ababa, Bangkok and Santiago.

Since its founding, the IU has held periodic international conferences and published conference papers. Until recently, with the exception of its UN work, the IU's principal function was to provide a forum for land and tax reformers around the world to exchange ideas at conference. At its 2006 Conference, in London, the IU agreed it "shall transform itself into an active and outgoing professional organisation".

== Campaigns and publications ==
At the Swanwick Conference in England in 1949 – as the United Nations was settling its Universal Declaration of Human Rights – the IU published a principle and policy pamphlet that later came to be known as its Declaration of Human Rights on Equal Freedom. This Declaration was translated into many languages, and subsequently amended and reaffirmed; most recently in 2001.

In 2008 the IU launched a global online petition to reform the UDHR by amending its Articles 3 and 29 to include "a universal right to a place on earth".

The IU is in the course of publishing the 'Economics of Abundance' series of monographs, written by the British economist Fred Harrison. The first volume, published in 2008, titled The Silver Bullet, deals with global poverty.

Through its UN representatives the IU supports LVT implementation projects around the world, including South Africa, Nigeria and Vanuatu. The IU has contributed to the development of the Land Rights and Land Value Capture online course and training program created under the auspices of the UN's Global Land Tools Network.

The IU has produced (2008) two documentary short films on human rights and poverty in southern Africa.
