= List of organizations nominated for the Nobel Peace Prize =

Latest organization awarded
- Nihon Hidankyo
- "for its efforts to achieve a world free of nuclear weapons and for demonstrating through witness testimony that nuclear weapons must never be used again."
- Website: Official website

Four most common symbols representing freedom, justice and peace: (1) the 1958 symbol designed for the British nuclear disarmament movement now widely known as the "peace sign"; (2) the dove due to its association with the biblical story of Noah's Ark and the return of peace after the flood considered another symbol for peace; (3) the dove and hand symbol, created by Predrag Stakić, was selected as the official logo for universal human rights after a global contest; and (4) the weighing scale is a symbol for justice because it visually represents the idea of fairness and impartiality.

The Nobel Peace Prize is one of the five Nobel prizes established according to Alfred Nobel's 1895 will. It is awarded annually to those who have "done the most or the best work for fraternity between nations, for the abolition or reduction of standing armies and for the holding and promotion of peace congress".

Since 1901, there have been a number of organizations (Note: "Organizations" refers to any collective group such as foundations, movements, institutes, societies, nations, federations, ministries, programmes, committees or associations.) nominated for the prize. The first organization to win was the Institute of International Law, founded by Gustave Moynier and Gustave Rolin-Jaequemyns, in 1904. The institute works in making the rules of international law, abolishing causes and motives of war and violence, and developing guidelines for peaceful relations between sovereign states.

From 1901 to 1974, there have been at least 141 organizations, unions, and movements nominated for the prize, 11 of which were awarded the prize (1904, 1910, 1917, 1938, 1947, 1954, 1963, 1965, 1969, 1977, and 1995). The International Committee of the Red Cross is the most honoured organization for the prize and one of the most widely recognized organizations in the world, having won three Nobel Peace Prizes (in 1917, 1944, and 1963). The third time it won, the prize was shared with the League of Red Cross Societies. It was followed by the United Nations High Commissioner for Refugees which has won twice in 1954 and 1981.

There have been 19 years in which the Peace Prize was not awarded. As of October 2024, the Peace Prize has been awarded to 28 organizations: Institute of International Law (1904), Permanent International Peace Bureau (1910), International Committee of the Red Cross (1917, 1944 and 1963), Nansen International Office for Refugees (1938), Friends Service Council and American Friends Service Committee (1947), United Nations High Commissioner for Refugees (1954 and 1981), League of Red Cross Societies (1963), United Nations Children's Fund (1965), International Labour Organization (1969), Amnesty International (1977), International Physicians for the Prevention of Nuclear War (1985), United Nations Peace-Keeping Forces (1988), Pugwash Conferences on Science and World Affairs (1995), International Campaign to Ban Landmines (1997), Médecins Sans Frontières (1999), United Nations (2001), International Atomic Energy Agency (2005), Grameen Bank (2006), Intergovernmental Panel on Climate Change (2007), European Union (2012), Organisation for the Prohibition of Chemical Weapons (2013), Tunisian National Dialogue Quartet (2015), International Campaign to Abolish Nuclear Weapons (2017), World Food Programme (2020), Memorial and Center for Civil Liberties (2022) and Nihon Hidankyo (2024).

== Organizations by the year of their first nomination ==
Despite the following list consists of notable organizations deemed worthy of the prize, there have been other organizations that contributed to peacebuilding, promoting human rights and international law, which may have or may have not been nominated, since the Nobel nomination archives are revealed 50 years after, and among them:

- International and inter-governmental organizations: International Fund for Agricultural Development (1977), International Maritime Organization (1948), International Monetary Fund (1944), International Telecommunication Union (1865), United Nations Industrial Development Organization (1966), World Bank Group (1944), World Intellectual Property Organization (1967), World Meteorological Organization (1950), International Refugee Organization (1946), International Organization for Migration (1951), United Nations Economic and Social Council (1945), United Nations Population Fund (1969), Organisation of Islamic Cooperation (1969), Organisation of Eastern Caribbean States (1981), and Association of Southeast Asian Nations (1967).
- Human rights and freedom organizations: Freedom House (1971), Inter-American Commission on Human Rights (1959), International Federation for Human Rights (1922), Helsinki Committee for Human Rights (1976), Human Rights First (1978), United Nations Human Rights Council (2006), Human Rights Watch (1978), Humanists International (1952), Humanity & Inclusion (1982), Disabled Peoples' International (1972), National Right to Life Committee (1968), Society for the Protection of Unborn Children (1967), Human Life International (1981), Refugees International (1979), International Alliance of Women (1904), League of Women Voters (1920), National Coalition for Men (1977), National Network Opposing the Militarization of Youth (2004), Youth Against Dictatorship (2023), Operation Underground Railroad (2013), Coalition to Abolish Slavery and Trafficking (1998), La Strada International (2004), International Centre for Missing & Exploited Children (1998), International Rehabilitation Council for Torture Victims (1985), Freedom from Torture (1985), International Association of Genocide Scholars (1994), Lawyers Without Borders (2000), PEN International (1921), Freedom of the Press Foundation (2012), Index on Censorship (1972), Reporters Committee for Freedom of the Press (1970) and International Freedom of Expression Exchange (1992).
- Nuclear-ban and research organizations: Trident Ploughshares (1998), Nuclear Information and Resource Service (1978), The Ribbon International (1983), United Nations Office for Disarmament Affairs (1998), Union of Concerned Scientists (1969), European Organization for Nuclear Research (1954), Global Security Institute (1999), Joint Institute for Nuclear Research (1956), Society for Radiological Protection (1963), International Radiation Protection Association (1965), World Association of Nuclear Operators (1989), and Institute of Nuclear Materials Management (1958).
- Environmenatal and indigenous rights organizations: Forest Peoples Programme (1990), Green Cross International (1993), Survival International (1969), United Nations Permanent Forum on Indigenous Issues (2000), World Council of Indigenous Peoples (1975), Environmental Defense Fund (1967), International Union for Conservation of Nature (1948), World Network of Biosphere Reserves (1976), Conservation International (1987), Global Forest Coalition (2000), The Climate Mobilization (2014), Revive & Restore (2012), and Wildlife Conservation Society (1895), Friends of the Earth (1969), Fauna and Flora International (1903), Green Belt Movement (1977), The Climate Reality Project (2006), 350.org (2007), Extinction Rebellion (2018), and Youth Climate Movement (2005).
- Humanitarian and charity organizations: Emergency (1994), Caritas Internationalis (1951), Open Doors (1955), Aid to the Church in Need (1947), World Relief (1944), International Christian Concern (1995), Plenty International (1974), Habitat for Humanity International (1976), Union of Medical Care and Relief Organizations (2012), Catholic Relief Services (1943), Catholic Worker Movement (1933), Society of Saint Vincent de Paul (1833), Kolping Society (1850), Norwegian People's Aid (1939), Child In Need Institute (1974), Emmaus Community (1949), Terre des Hommes International Federation (1966), Malteser International (2005), Mercy Ships (1978), Action Against Hunger (1979), Rise Against Hunger (1998), Mary's Meals (2002), The Trussell Trust (1997), Angat Buhay Foundation (2022), Mennonite Central Committee (1920), Médecins du Monde (1980), International Catholic Migration Commission (1951), United Mission for Relief & Development (2010) and International Islamic Relief Organization (1978).
- Maritime organizations: Blue Ventures (2003), Deep Sea Conservation Coalition (2004), International Seabed Authority (1994), Marine Conservation Society (1983), Ocean Conservancy (1972), Oceana (2001), Our Seas Our Future (2011), Save Our Seas Foundation (2003), Sea Ranger Service (2016), Pacific Environment (1987), and Society for Marine Mammalogy (1981).
- Universal peace and fraternity organizations: World Peace Council (1949), Peace Alliance (2004), World Beyond War (2014), Code Pink:Women for Peace (2002), Economists for Peace and Security (1989), Veterans for Peace (1985), International Peace Institute (1970), Interpeace (1994), Peace Direct (2003), European Institute of Peace (2014), United Nations Peacebuilding Commission (2005), Peace Research Institute Oslo (1959), Peace and Justice Studies Association (2001), Seeds of Peace (1993), Peace History Society (1964), International Peace and Security Institute (2009), Religions for Peace (1970), World Peace Foundation (1910), and Stockholm International Peace Research Institute (1966).

=== 1901–1950 ===
Symbol	Name	Founded	Years nominated	Notes
1901
	Institute of International Law	September 1873; Ghent, Belgium	1901, 1902, 1903, 1904, 1912, 1923, 1930, 1938, 1965, 1968	Awarded the 1904 Nobel Peace Prize. (Note: "for its striving in public law to develop peaceful ties between nations and to make the laws of war more humane")
	Permanent International Peace Bureau	November 1891; Geneva, Switzerland	1901, 1902, 1903, 1904, 1905, 1906, 1907, 1908, 1909, 1910, 1911, 1920, 1922, 1925, 1926, 1928, 1929, 1930, 1931, 1932, 1933, 1935, 1937, 1938, 1946, 1947, 1948	Awarded the 1910 Nobel Peace Prize. (Note: "for acting as a link between the peace societies of the various countries, and helping them to organize the world rallies of the international peace movement")
	International Committee of the Red Cross	February 1863; Geneva, Switzerland	1901, 1917, 1940, 1944, 1945, 1949, 1963, 2001, 2002, 2005, 2024	Awarded the 1917 Nobel Peace Prize. (Note: "for its efforts to take care of wounded soldiers and prisoners of war and their families")
	International Committee of the Red Cross	February 1863; Geneva, Switzerland	1901, 1917, 1940, 1944, 1945, 1949, 1963, 2001, 2002, 2005, 2024	Awarded the 1944 Nobel Peace Prize. (Note: "for the great work it has performed during the war on behalf of humanity")
	International Committee of the Red Cross	February 1863; Geneva, Switzerland	1901, 1917, 1940, 1944, 1945, 1949, 1963, 2001, 2002, 2005, 2024	Awarded the 1963 Nobel Peace Prize with the League of Red Cross Societies. (Note: "for promoting the principles of the Geneva Convention and cooperation with the U.N.")
	Lombard Union of the International Peace Society	April 1895; Milan, Italy	1901	Nominated by Edoardo Porro (1842–1902).
	English Peace Society	June 1816; London, England	1901, 1902, 1903, 1905, 1908, 1911, 1913, 1915, 1923, 1924	
	Inter-Parliamentary Union	1889; Geneva, Switzerland	1901, 1902, 1903, 1904, 1905, 1906, 1909, 1910, 1922, 1923, 1924, 1925, 1926, 1927, 1928, 1929, 1930, 1931, 1932, 1934, 1935, 1938, 1939, 1940, 1947, 1950, 1951	
1902
	Union of French Women	June 1881; Paris, France	1902, 1903, 1904, 1905, 1906	
1904
	Universal Peace Union	April 1888; Philadelphia, Pennsylvania, United States	1904, 1906, 1908, 1910	Nominated by Belva Ann Lockwood (1830–1917) each time.
1905
	International Arbitration League	1870; London, England	1905, 1906, 1907, 1908	
	Society of Comparative Legislation	1869; Paris, France	1905, 1908, 1909, 1910, 1911, 1912, 1913, 1914, 1915, 1916, 1917, 1918, 1919, 1920	
	American Peace Society	May 1828; New York City, New York, United States	1905, 1908, 1934	
1906
	Paris Institute of Political Studies	December 1971; Paris, France	1906	Nominated by Ernest Lavisse (1842–1922).
1908
	German Peace Society	December 1892; Berlin, Germany	1908, 1911, 1912, 1913, 1914	
1909
	League in Paris for the Defense of the Abused Natives of the Congo State	May 1908; Paris, France	1909	Nominated by Carl Hilty (1833–1909).
1910
	Committee of Union and Progress	June 1889; Istanbul, Türkiye	1910	Nominated by Ahmet Rıza (1858–1930).
1911
	South American Universal Peace Association	1907; Buenos Aires, Argentina	1911	Nominated by Ángela de Oliveira Cézar de Costa (1860–1940).
	International Arbitration and Peace Association	1880; London, England	1911, 1912	Nominated by Felix Moscheles (1833–1917) each time.
	World's Christian Endeavor Union	February 1881; Portland, Maine, United States	1911, 1912, 1913	
1912 (Note: No Nobel Prize has been awarded this year.)
	Peace Committee of the Society of Friends	1880s London, England	1912	Nominated by Laust Jevsen Moltesen (1865–1950).
	Royal Saxon Institute of Cultural and Universal History at the University of Leipzig	1909; Leipzig, Saxony, Germany	1912	
	International Socialist Bureau	1900; Paris, France	1912, 1913, 1914	
1913
	International Union of Friends of Young Women	1877; Neuchâtel, Switzerland	1913	Nominated by Charles Albert Gobat (1843–1914).
	Norwegian Peace Association	1885; Oslo, Norway	1913, 1915, 1916, 1917, 1918	
	Swedish Peace and Arbitration League	1883; Stockholm, Sweden	1913, 1915, 1916, 1917, 1918	
	The Swedish Peace and Arbitration League and The Swedish Peace Association	1883; Stockholm, Sweden	1916, 1917	
	The Danish Peace Association	November 1882; Copenhagen, Denmark	1913, 1915, 1916, 1917, 1918, 1920	
	League of Peace and Freedom	1867; Geneva, Switzerland	1913, 1923, 1924, 1925, 1926, 1927, 1928, 1929, 1930, 1931, 1932, 1933	
1914
	Stead Memorial Fund	London, England	1914, 1915	Nominated by Johan Castberg (1862–1926).
1915
	Belgian Relief Committee	October 1914; Brussels, Belgium	1915	Nominated by Edward Benjamin Krehbiel (1878–1950).
	General Savings and Retirement Fund	1865; Brussels, Belgium	1915	
	Nordic Inter-Parliamentary Union	1907; Copenhagen, Denmark	1915	
	Catholic University of Louvain	November 1834; Brussels, Belgium	1915	
	Comité Ador	August 1914; Geneva, Switzerland	1915	
	International Prisoners of War Agency	August 1914; Geneva, Switzerland	1918	
	The Hague Academy of International Law (Note: The Hague Academy of International Law was nominated in 1915 and 1916 as Lassa F. L. Oppenheim (1858–1919) believed that it was to open particularly in October 1914 or perhaps in the following years. It was not in full operation as an establishment until July 1923.)	July 1923; The Hague, Netherlands	1915, 1916, 1932, 1933, 1934, 1935, 1936, 1937, 1938, 1947, 1951, 1952, 1954, 1956, 1973, 1974, 1975, 1976	
1916
	Belgian Arbitration Society	Brussels, Belgium	1916	Nominated jointly with National Peace Council, Émile Arnaud (1864–1921) and Edoardo Giretti (1864–1940) by Gaston Moch (1859–1935).
	Swiss Peace Society	Switzerland	1916	Nominated jointly with National Peace Council, Émile Arnaud (1864–1921) and Edoardo Giretti (1864–1940) by Gaston Moch (1859–1935).
	Central Organization for Durable Peace	April 1915; The Hague, Netherlands	1916, 1918	
	International Museum of War and Peace	1902; Lucerne, Switzerland	1916, 1918	Nominated by Franz Bucher-Heller (1868–1925).
	National Peace Council	1908; London, England	1916, 1921, 1922	
	International Committee of Women for Permanent Peace	April 1915; Geneva, Switzerland	1916	Nominated by Carl Lindhagen (1860–1946).
	Women's International League for Peace and Freedom	April 1915; Geneva, Switzerland	1955, 1956, 1957, 1958, 1959, 1961, 1965, 1966, 1967, 1968, 1969, 1970, 1975, 2013, 2021, 2025	
1917
	German Economic Association	October 1873; Eisenach, Thuringia, Germany	1917	Nominated by Gustav von Schmoller (1838–1917).
	Dutch Anti-War Council	1914; The Hague, Netherlands	1917, 1918, 1919	
1918
	Universal Alliance of Young Men's Christian Unions	June 1844; Geneva, Switzerland	1918, 1919, 1920	
	Nordic Peace Association	1912; Copenhagen, Denmark	1918, 1922	
1920
	Union of Democratic Control	August 1914; London, England	1920, 1922	
1921
	American Red Cross	May 1881; Washington, D.C., United States	1921	
1922
	Government of Estonia	February 1918; Tallinn, Estonia	1922	Nominated by Ernst Klefbeck (1866–1950).
	International Council of Women	March 1888; Washington, D. C., United States	1922, 1923, 1935, 1975	
1923
	Society of Friends (Quakers)	c. 1652; Ulverston, Cumbria, England	1923, 1924, 1926, 1947	Awarded the 1947 Nobel Peace Prize (represented by the Friends Service Council and American Friends Service Committee) (Note: "for their pioneering work in the international peace movement and compassionate effort to relieve human suffering, thereby promoting the fraternity between nations")
	Friends Service Council	1927; London, England	1937, 1938	Awarded the 1947 Nobel Peace Prize (represented by the Friends Service Council and American Friends Service Committee)
	American Friends Service Committee	April 1917; Philadelphia, Pennsylvania, United States	1937, 1938	Awarded the 1947 Nobel Peace Prize (represented by the Friends Service Council and American Friends Service Committee)
	International Philarmenian League	1920; Geneva, Switzerland	1923	Nominated jointly with the Hellenic Red Cross by James Vallotton (?).
	Hellenic Red Cross	June 1877; Athens, Greece	1923, 1924, 1930	
	International Law Association	October 1873; Brussels, Belgium	1923, 1925, 1926, 1927, 1929, 1930, 1931, 1932, 1933, 1934, 1935, 1936, 1937, 1938, 1968	
1924
	Brazilian Historic and Geographic Institute	October 1838; Rio de Janeiro, Brazil	1924	Nominated by Clóvis Beviláqua (1859–1944).
	International Cooperative Alliance	August 1895; London, England	1924	Nominated by Fekko Ebel Hajo Ebels (1878–1951).
	International Federation of Trade Unions	July 1919; Amsterdam, Netherlands	1924, 1925, 1927	
1925
	League of Nations	January 1920; Geneva, Switzerland	1925	Nominated jointly with Robert Cecil (1864–1958) by Fridtjof Nansen (1861–1930).
	International Federation of League of Nations Societies	1919; Geneva, Switzerland	1926, 1929, 1930, 1931, 1935, 1936, 1938, 1946, 1948	
	German League for Human Rights	November 1914; Berlin, Germany	1925, 1931	
	French League for Human Rights	June 1898; Paris, France	1925, 1926, 1931	
1927		June 1898; Paris, France		
	Permanent Court of Arbitration	1899; The Hague, Netherlands	1927	Nominated by Frederik Beichmann (1859–1937).
1929
	International Organisation of Good Templars	1851; Utica, New York, United States	1929, 1930, 1951	
1930
	Save the Children Fund	April 1919; London, England	1930, 2013, 2026	
	International Save the Children Union	January 1920; Geneva, Switzerland	1950, 1951	
	International Union for Child Welfare	September 1946; Geneva, Switzerland	1954, 1968, 1971, 1973	
1931
	Permanent Court of International Justice	December 1920; The Hague, Netherlands	1931	Nominated by Frederik Beichmann (1859–1937).
	Conférence Balkanique	October 1930; Athens, Greece	1931	
	Government of Finland	November 1917; Helsinki, Finland	1931	Nominated by Rafael Erich (1879–1946).
	International Institute of Agriculture	May 1905; Rome, Italy	1931	
1932
	Institute for Comparative Public Law and International Law	1924; Berlin, Germany	1932	Nominated by Åke Hammarskjöld (1893–1937).
	The Norden Associations	1919; Stockholm, Sweden	1932, 1933	Nominated by Eric Hallin (1870–1965) each time.
1933
	International Association for Social Progress	September 1925; Bern, Switzerland	1933	Nominated by Justin Godart (1871–1956).
	The Spanish Parliament	1834; Madrid, Spain	1933	
	War Resisters' International	March 1921; Bilthoven, Netherlands	1933	Nominated by Helene Stöcker (1869–1943).
1934
	Disarmament Committee of the Women's International Organizations	September 1931; Geneva, Switzerland	1934	
	International People's College	1921; Helsingør, Denmark	1934	Nominated by Carl Theodor Zahle (1866–1946).
	International Committee of Historical Sciences	May 1926; Geneva, Switzerland	1934, 1935, 1936	
1936
	Nansen International Office for Refugees	April 1931; Geneva, Switzerland	1936, 1937, 1938, 1940	Awarded the 1938 Nobel Peace Prize. (Note: "for having carried on the work of Fridtjof Nansen to the benefit of refugees across Europe")
	High Commission for Refugees	June 1921; London, England	1936	Nominated jointly with Nansen International Office for Refugees by Halvdan Koht (1873–1965).
	International Committee on Intellectual Cooperation	August 1922; Paris, France	1936	Nominated by Michael Hansson (1875–1944).
1937
	League of Red Cross Societies	May 1919; Paris, France	1937, 1939, 1953, 2024	Awarded the 1963 Nobel Peace Prize with the International Committee of the Red Cross.
	Red Cross Association	May 1919; Paris, France	1963	Awarded the 1963 Nobel Peace Prize with the International Committee of the Red Cross.
	Relief Committee for Exiled Pacifists	1936; Geneva, Switzerland	1937, 1938, 1939, 1940	
1938
	Les Lieux de Genève	Geneva, Switzerland	1938, 1939	
1940
	Finnish Red Cross	May 1877; Helsinki, Finland	1940	
	Junior Red Cross	1922; Sweden	1940	Nominated jointly with International Committee of the Red Cross by Hax Huber (1874–1960).
	International Conference of Associations of Disabled and Other Ex-Service Men	1925; Geneva, Switzerland	1940	Nominated by René Cassin (1887–1976).
	Nation of Finland	—N/a	1940	Nominated by Georges-Djura Popovitch (1892–?).
	Peace on Earth	December 1939; United States	1940 (Note: The 1939 short cartoon Peace on Earth directed by Hugh Harman was purportedly nominated for a Nobel Peace Prize. However, it is not listed in the official Nobel Prize nomination database.)	
	Swedish Red Cross	May 1865; Stockholm, Sweden	1940, 1944, 1945	
	Norwegian Red Cross	September 1865; Oslo, Norway	1940, 1945	
1946
	Belgian Union of the League of Nations	1919; Brussels, Belgium	1946	Nominated by Henri Rolin (1891–1973).
1947
	Carnegie Endowment for International Peace	December 1910; Washington, D.C., United States	1947	Nominated by Francisco Walker–Linares (1894–?).
1949
	International Labour Organization	April 1919; Geneva, Switzerland	1949, 1969	Awarded the 1969 Nobel Peace Prize. (Note: "for creating international legislation insuring certain norms for working conditions in every country")
	Count Bernadotte Memorial Fund	1948; Kruså, Denmark	1949	
	Cooperative for Assistance and Relief Everywhere	November 1945; New York City, New York, United States	1949, 1951, 2024	
	Grotius Society	1915; London, England	1949, 1950, 1951, 1952, 1953, 1954, 1955	
	Service Civil International	November 1920; Bilthoven, Utrecht, Netherlands	1949, 1950, 1957, 1958	
1950
	United Nations International Children's Emergency Fund	December 1946; New York City, New York, United States	1950, 1951, 1963, 1964, 1965, 1981, 2013	Awarded the 1965 Nobel Peace Prize. (Note: "for its effort to enhance solidarity between nations and reduce the difference between rich and poor states")
	World Movement for World Federal Government	August 1937; Montreux, Vaud, Switzerland	1950	

=== 1951–2000 ===
Picture	Name	Founded	Years nominated	Notes
1951
	European Movement International	July 1947; Brussels, Belgium	1951	
1952
	American Society of International Law	January 1906; Washington, D.C., United States	1952	
	Edinburgh Festival Society	August 1947; Edinburgh, Scotland	1952, 1953	Nominated by John Boyd Orr (1880–1971) each time.
1953
	Moral Re-Armament	1938; Oxford, England	1953, 1954, 1956, 1959, 1962	
	International Olympic Committee	June 1894; Lausanne, Switzerland	1953, 1955, 1986, 1989	
1954
	International Council of Nurses	1899; Geneva, Switzerland	1954	
	Universal Esperanto Association	April 1908; Rotterdam, Netherlands	1954, 1955, 1959, 1961, 1962, 1963, 1964, 1965, 1966, 1967, 1968, 1970, 1971, 1972, 1973, 1975, 1976	
1955
	United Nations High Commissioner for Refugees	December 1950; Geneva, Switzerland	1955, 1981, 2017, 2024	Awarded the 1954 Nobel Peace Prize in 1955. (Note: "for its efforts to heal the wounds of war by providing help and protection to refugees all over the world")
	United Nations High Commissioner for Refugees	December 1950; Geneva, Switzerland	1955, 1981, 2017, 2024	Awarded the 1981 Nobel Peace Prize. (Note: "for promoting the fundamental rights of refugees")
1956
	International Civil Aviation Organization	April 1947; Chicago, Illinois, United States	1956	
	International Air Transport Association	April 1945; Havana, Cuba	1956	Nominated jointly with International Civil Aviation Organization and Howard Kurtz (1907–1997) by Oliver Lissitzyn (1912–1994).
	International Federation of Air Line Pilots' Associations	April 1948; London, England	1956	Nominated jointly with International Civil Aviation Organization and Howard Kurtz (1907–1997) by Oliver Lissitzyn (1912–1994).
	Rotary International	February 1905; Chicago, Illinois, United States	1956, 1974	
1957
	World Organization of the Scout Movement	1922; Paris, France	1957, 1975, 1976, 1988, 1989, 2021	
1958
	International Chamber of Commerce	1919; Atlantic City, New Jersey, United States	1958	
	Inomeuropeisk Mission	October 1938; Stockholm, Sweden	1958	
	Institute of World Affairs	1924; Geneva, Switzerland	1958	Nominated by Norman Angell (1872–1967).
1959
	International Council for Scientific Unions	1931; Paris, France	1959	
	Austrian Philanthropic Society	Vienna, Austria	1959	Nominated by Karl Lugmayer (1892–1972).
1961
	World Veterans Federation	November 1950; Paris, France	1961, 1962, 1963, 1964, 1965, 1966	
1962
	Youth Aliyah Organization	January 1933; Berlin, Germany	1962	
	International Commission of Jurists	1952; Geneva, Switzerland	1962, 1963, 1964, 1965, 1966	
	The Rockefeller Foundation	May 1913; New York City, New York, United States	1962, 1964, 1968	
1963
	Pugwash Continuing Committee	July 1957; London, England	1963, 1964, 1975, 1976	Awarded the 1995 Nobel Peace Prize with Joseph Rotblat. (Note: "for their efforts to diminish the part played by nuclear arms in international politics and, in the longer run, to eliminate such arms")
	Pugwash Conferences on Science and World Affairs	July 1957; London, England	1968, 1969, 1971	Awarded the 1995 Nobel Peace Prize with Joseph Rotblat.
	Frontier Villages Program of the Arab Development Society	1945; Jericho, Palestine	1963	Nominated by Rowland Egger (1908–1979).
	United Towns Organization	April 1957; Aix-les-Bains, Savoie, France	1963, 1966, 1969, 1974	
1964
	Norwegian Missionary Society	August 1842; Stavanger, Norway	1964	Nominated by Knut Robberstad (1899–1981).
	Oxford Committee for Famine Relief	October 1942; London, England	1964, 1992	
1965
	The Salvation Army	July 1865; London, England	1965, 1969, 1974, 1976, 1981, 1988, 1991, 1993, 2004, 2023	
1966
	International Planned Parenthood Federation	November 1952; Bombay, India	1966, 1967	
	International Union for Land Value Taxation and Free Trade	1926; Copenhagen, Denmark	1966, 1967, 1968, 1969, 1970, 1971, 1972, 1973, 1974	
1967
	Amnesty International	July 1961; London, England	1967, 1968, 1970, 1972, 1973, 1977	Awarded the 1977 Nobel Peace Prize. (Note: "for worldwide respect for human rights")
	Lions Clubs International	June 1917; Chicago, Illinois, United States	1967	
	Organization of American States	April 1948; Bogotá, Colombia	1967	
	United Poets Laureate International	1963; Manila, Philippines	1967	Nominated by Angel Macapagal (1917–1993).
	World Federation of United Nations Associations	August 1946; New York City, New York, United States	1967	Nominated by Paul Guggenheim (1899–1977).
	Islands of Peace	1958; Brussels, Belgium	1967, 1968, 1969, 1970, 1971	
1968
	World Council of Churches	August 1948; Amsterdam, Netherlands	1968	
	United Nations Educational, Scientific and Cultural Organization	November 1945; Paris, France	1968, 1969, 1970, 1972	
	SOS Children's Villages	1949; Imst, Austria	1968, 2005, 2006, 2008, 2009, 2011	
	World Health Organization	April 1948; Geneva, Switzerland	1968, 1973, 1987, 1988, 2020, 2021, 2022	
1969
	The People of Czechoslovakia	—N/a	1969	
1970
	International Institute for Strategic Studies	1958; London, England	1970	Nominated by Carl Friedrich von Weizsäcker (1912–2007).
	Joint Church Aid	1967; New York City, United States	1970	
	Shop Stewards of the Belfast Shipyards	Belfast, Northern Ireland	1970	
	International Fellowship of Reconciliation	August 1914; Amsterdam, Netherlands	1970	Nominated by American Friends Service Committee.
	United States Fellowship of Reconciliation	November 1915; Garden City, New York, United States	1970	Nominated by American Friends Service Committee.
1971
	Jugend in Bayreuth	Germany	1971	Nominated by Christoph Schiller (1927–1994).
	Centre for Cultural and Social Cooperation	France	1971	Nominated by Carl Egil Wang (1930–2016).
1972
	Population Council	1952; New York City, United States	1972, 1973	
1973
	Universal Postal Union	October 1874; Bern, Switzerland	1973, 1974	
	International League of Associations for the Mentally Handicapped	1969; Brussels, Belgium	1973, 1975	
1974
	Committee on Human Rights in the USSR	November 1970; New York City, United States	1974	Nominated jointly with Andrei Sakharov (1921–1989).
	International Press Institute	October 1950; New York, US	1974, 1975	
	Fulbright Program	August 1946; Washington, D.C., US	1974, 1975, 1976	
1975
	Inter-American Children's Institute	July 1924; Montevideo, Uruguay	1975	Nominated by Edner Brutus (1911–1980).
	Armed Forces Movement	September 1974; Lisbon, Portugal	1975	
	World Association of Girl Guides and Girl Scouts	May 1928; Parád, Heves, Hungary	1975, 1976, 2021	
1976
	Children's International Summer Villages	1950; Cincinnati, Ohio, United States	1976	
	Committee of Cooperation for Peace in Chile	October 1973; Santiago, Chile	1976	Nominated by American Friends Service Committee.
1978
	Georgian Helsinki Group	January 1977; Tbilisi, Georgia	1978, 1979	Nominated jointly with the Moscow Helsinki Group by the Commission on Security and Cooperation in Europe each time.
	Lithuanian Helsinki Group	November 1976; Vilnius, Lithuania	1978, 1979	Nominated jointly with the Moscow Helsinki Group by the Commission on Security and Cooperation in Europe each time.
	Ukrainian Helsinki Group	November 1976; Kyiv, Ukraine	1978, 1979	Nominated jointly with the Moscow Helsinki Group by the Commission on Security and Cooperation in Europe each time.
	Moscow Helsinki Group	May 1976; Moscow, Russia	1978, 1978, 2007	
1979
	Anti-Slavery International	April 1839; London, England	1979	
1981
	Human Rights Commission of El Salvador	May 1978; San Salvador, El Salvador	1981	
1982
	International Physicians for the Prevention of Nuclear War	December 1980; Boston, Massachusetts, United States	1982, 1983, 1984, 1985, 2019	Awarded the 1985 Nobel Peace Prize. (Note: "for spreading authoritative information and by creating awareness of the catastrophic consequences of nuclear war")
	Summer Institute of Linguistics	1934; Dallas, Texas, United States	1982	
1984
	United Nations Convention on the Law of the Sea	December 1982; Montego Bay, Jamaica	1984	
1985
	Médecins Sans Frontières	December 1971; Paris, France	1985, 1993, 1999, 2018, (Note: As part of the joint candidature of "Righteous of the Mediterranean Sea") 2019, 2024	Awarded the 1999 Nobel Peace Prize. (Note: "in recognition of the organisation's pioneering humanitarian work on several continents")
	Nihon Hidankyō	August 1956; Shibadaimon, Minato, Tokyo, Japan	1985, 1994, 2005, 2017, 2018, 2024	Awarded the 2024 Nobel Peace Prize. (Note: "for its efforts to achieve a world free of nuclear weapons and for demonstrating through witness testimony that nuclear weapons must never be used again")
	Hibakusha of Japan	1945; Hiroshima and Nagasaki, Japan	2015, 2022	Awarded the 2024 Nobel Peace Prize.
1986
	Grupo de Apoyo Mutuo	June 1984; Guatemala City, Guatemala	1986	
	United Nations Interim Force in Lebanon	March 1978; An-Naqoura, Tyre, Lebanon	1986	
	Greenpeace	September 1971; Vancouver, British Columbia, Canada	1986, 2018	
1987
	Charter 77	December 1976; Prague, Czech Republic	1987	
1988
	United Nations Peace-Keeping Forces	May 1948; New York City, United States	1988	Awarded the 1988 Nobel Peace Prize. (Note: "for for preventing armed clashes and creating conditions for negotiations")
	British Broadcasting Corporation	October 1922; London, England	1988	
	Oxford Research Group	1982; Cambridge Heath, London, England	1988, 1989, 1991	
1991
	Radio Free Europe/Radio Liberty	December 1949; Munich, Bavaria, Germany	1991	Nominated by Lennart Meri (1929–2006).
1992
	Friendship Force International	March 1977; Washington, D.C., United States	1992	
1993
	Jerusalem International YMCA	April 1933; Jerusalem, Israel	1993	
	Unrepresented Nations and Peoples Organization	February 1991; The Hague, Netherlands	1993	
	Medical Review – Auschwitz	1961; Kraków, Poland	1993, 1994, 1995	
	Academia Tahuichi Aguilera	May 1978; Santa Cruz de la Sierra, Santa Cruz, Bolivia	1993, 1994, 1995, 1996, 1997, 1998	
1995
	North Atlantic Treaty Organization	April 1949; Washington, D.C., United States	1995, 2021, 2022	
1996
	Union of the Committees of Soldiers' Mothers of Russia	1989; Chechnya, Russia	1995	
1997
	International Campaign to Ban Landmines	October 1992; New York City, United States	1997	Awarded the 1997 Nobel Peace Prize with Jody Williams. (Note: "for their work for the banning and clearing of anti-personnel mines")
1998
	Children's Peace Movement	1996; Apartadó, Antioquia, Colombia	1998	
1999
	International Association of Penal Law	March 1924; Paris, France	1999	
2000
	City of Kukës	Kukës, Albania	2000	
	Karen Human Rights Group	1992; Hpa-an, Kayin, Myanmar	2000, 2001	

=== 2001–present ===
Picture	Name	Founded	Years nominated	Notes
2001
	United Nations	October 1945; San Francisco, California, United States	2001, 2024	Awarded the 2001 Nobel Peace Prize with Kofi Annan. (Note: "for their work for a better organized and more peaceful world")
	Falun Gong	May 1992; Changchun, Jilin, China	2001	
	Game of Soccer	—N/a	2001	
	International Federation of Association Football	May 1904; Paris, France	2001	
	Global Ties U.S.	1961; Washington, D.C., United States	2001	
	International Ocean Institute	1972; Malta	2001	
	Medical Mission of Mercy	1992; United States	2001	
	Peace Brigades International	1981; London, England	2001	
	Women in Black	January 1988; Jerusalem, Israel	2001, 2003	
	European Court of Human Rights	January 1959; Strasbourg, Bas-Rhin, France	2001, 2018, 2020, 2022, 2023	
2002
	International Criminal Tribunal for the former Yugoslavia	May 1993; The Hague, Netherlands	2002	
	National Peace Corps Association	1979; Washington, D.C., United States	2002	
	WE Charity	1995; Toronto, Ontario, Canada	2002, 2003, 2004	
	Peace Corps	March 1961; Washington, D.C., United States	2002, 2011	
	Community of Sant'Egidio	1968; Rome, Italy	2002, 2010, 2011	
2003
	European Union	November 1993; Maastricht, Netherlands	2003, 2004, 2009, 2011, 2012	Awarded the 2012 Nobel Peace Prize. (Note: "for over six decades contributed to the advancement of peace and reconciliation, democracy and human rights in Europe")
	Partnership Africa Canada	May 1986; New York City, United States	2003	
	Mathare Youth Sports Association	1987; Mathare, Nairobi, Kenya	2003, 2004	
	Global Witness	November 1993; London, England	2003, 2005	
2004
	International Atomic Energy Agency	July 1957; Vienna, Austria	2004, 2005	Awarded the 2005 Nobel Peace Prize with Mohamed ElBaradei. (Note: "for their efforts to prevent nuclear energy from being used for military purposes and to ensure that nuclear energy for peaceful purposes is used in the safest possible way")
	Courage to Refuse	January 2002; Jerusalem, Israel	2004	
	International Solidarity Movement	August 2001; Palestine	2004	
	Llangollen International Eisteddfod	June 1947; Llangollen, Denbighshire, Wales	2004	
	Treatment Action Campaign	December 1998; Cape Town, South Africa	2004	
	September Eleventh Families for Peaceful Tomorrows	February 2002; New York City, United States	2004, 2017, 2018	
2005
	Hadassah Medical Center	1912; New York City, United States	2005	
	Tiananmen Mothers	September 1989; Beijing, China	2005	
	1000 PeaceWomen	2003; Bern, Switzerland	2005	
	Public International Law & Policy Group	1995; London, England	2005	
2006
	Grameen Bank	October 1983; Chittagong, Bangladesh	2006	Awarded the 2006 Nobel Peace Prize with Muhammad Yunus. (Note: "for their efforts to create economic and social development from below")
	K-19 Soviet Submarine Crew	October 1961; Soviet Union	2006	
	Sail Training International	2002	2006, 2007	
2007
	Intergovernmental Panel on Climate Change	1988; Geneva, Switzerland	2007	Awarded the 2007 Nobel Peace Prize with Al Gore. (Note: "for their efforts to build up and disseminate greater knowledge about man-made climate change, and to lay the foundations for the measures that are needed to counteract such change")
	Memorial	January 1989; Moscow, Russia	2007, 2010, 2012, 2014, 2020, 2022	Awarded the 2022 Nobel Peace Prize with Ales Bialiatski and Center for Civil Liberties. (Note: "for many years promoted the right to criticise power and protect the fundamental rights of citizens, having made an outstanding effort to document war crimes, human right abuses and the abuse of power, and demonstrated the significance of civil society for peace and democracy")
	Academic Model Providing Access to Healthcare	1989; Eldoret, Uasin Gishu, Kenya	2007	
	Asociación de Cabildos Indígenas del Norte del Cauca	January 1994; Santander de Quilichao, Cauca, Colombia	2007	Nominated jointly.
	Peace Community of San José de Apartadó	March 1997; Apartadó, Antioquia, Colombia	2007	Nominated jointly.
	Mercy Corps	November 1979; Portland, Oregon, United States	2007	
	Union of Councils for Jews in the Former Soviet Union	October 1970; Washington, D.C., United States	2007	
	Ladies in White	2003; Havana, Cuba	2007, 2012, 2013	
2008
	Peace Boat	1983; Tokyo, Japan	2008	
	PeaceJam	February 1993; Denver, Colorado, United States	2008	
	Mayors for Peace	June 1982; Hiroshima, Japan	2008, 2011	
	Grandmothers of Plaza de Mayo	October 1977; Buenos Aires, Argentina	2008, 2010, 2018, 2023	
2009
	Cluster Munition Coalition	November 2003; Dublin, Ireland	2009, 2010	
	International Crisis Group	1995; Brussels, Belgium	2009, 2010	
	Nansen Dialogue Network	2000; Lillehammer, Norway	2009, 2013	
2010
	Internet	1983; United States	2010	
	School of the Americas Watch	1990; Washington, D.C., United States	2010	
	Special Court for Sierra Leone	January 2002; Freetown, Sierra Leone	2010	
	Vicente Ferrer Foundation	1969; Anantapur, Andhra Pradesh, India	2010	
	Military Religious Freedom Foundation	2005; Albuquerque, New Mexico, United States	2010, 2011, 2012, 2013, 2014, 2015	
	International Space Station	November 1998; Houston, Texas, United States	2010, 2014, 2020	
	WikiLeaks	October 2006; Australia	2010, 2011, 2012, 2013, 2014, 2015, 2024	
2011
	April 6 Youth Movement	2008; Egypt	2011	
	Roj TV	March 2004; Copenhagen, Denmark	2011	
	Wings of Hope	1963; St. Louis, Missouri, United States	2011, 2012	
2012
	Al Jazeera Media Network	November 1996; Wadi Al Sail, Doha, Qatar	2012	
	Antakya Civilizations Choir	February 2007; Antakya, Hatay, Türkiye	2012	
	Free the Slaves	2000; Washington, D.C., United States	2012	
	Independent Television Network Team	May 1955; London, England	2012	
	Nansen School's Dialogue Network	1995; Lillehammer, Norway	2012	
	Idhri Foundation	Pakistan	2012	
	Concerned for Working Children	1985; Bangalore, Karnataka, India	2012, 2013, 2014	
2013
	Organisation for the Prohibition of Chemical Weapons	April 1997; The Hague, Netherlands	2013	Awarded the 2013 Nobel Peace Prize. (Note: "for its extensive efforts to eliminate chemical weapons")
	Fondazione Opera Campana dei Caduti	August 1920; Rovereto, Trentino, Italy	2013	
	International Association of Judicial Independence and World Peace	1982; Zürich, Switzerland	2013	
	Kampala Conference to review the Rome Statute	May 2010; Kampala, Uganda	2013	
	Youth Human Rights Movement	1998; United States	2013	
	Bulgarian Orthodox Church	864 A.D. Sofia, Bulgaria	2013, 2016, 2017	
	Gavi, The Vaccine Alliance	January 2000; Geneva, Switzerland	2013, 2014, 2021	
2014
	Tunisian General Labour Union	January 1946; Tunis, Tunisia	2014	Awarded the 2015 Nobel Peace Prize. (Note: "for its decisive contribution to the building of a pluralistic democracy in Tunisia in the wake of the Jasmine Revolution of 2011")
	Tunisian National Dialogue Quartet	August 2013; Tunisia	2015	Awarded the 2015 Nobel Peace Prize.
	Ekta Parishad (Unity Forum)	December 1991; Madhya Pradesh, India	2014	
	International Lesbian, Gay, Bisexual, Trans and Intersex Association	August 1978; Coventry, England	2014	
	Musalaha Peace and Reconciliation Initiative	1990; Jerusalem, Israel	2014	
	National Priorities Project	1983; Northampton, Massachusetts, United States	2014	
	Self Employed Women's Association	1972; Ahmedabad, Gujarat, India	2014	
	Slum Dwellers International	1996; Cape Town, South Africa	2014	
	Novaya Gazeta	April 1993; Moscow, Russia	2014, 2015, 2016, 2018, 2020	
	Article 9 Association	2004; Tokyo, Japan	2014, 2015, 2021	
2015
	African Youth Initiative Network	2005; Lira, Uganda	2015	
	Associazione Rondine Cittadella della Pace	1997; Rondine, Arezzo, Italy	2015	
	Butterflies with New Wings Building a Future	2010; Buenaventura, Colombia	2015	
	Echo of Moscow	August 1990; Moscow, Russia	2015	
	Organization for Security and Co-operation in Europe	January 1995; Budapest, Hungary	2015	
	TV Rain [Dozhd]	April 2008; Moscow, Russia	2015	
	One Billion Acts of Peace	May 2014; New York City, United States	2015, 2017, 2018	
	International Association of Lawyers against Nuclear Arms	April 1988; Stockholm, Sweden	2015, 2016, 2017, 2018	
	Foro Penal	June 2005; Caracas, Venezuela	2015, 2016, 2019	
2016
	City of Kilis	Kilis, Türkiye	2016	
	Emanuel African Methodist Episcopal Church	May 1816; Charleston, South Carolina, United States	2016	
	Government of Colombia	1886; Bogotá, Colombia	2016	
	Greek Islanders (Note: People of Lesbos, Kos, Chíos, Samos, Rhodes and Leros)	—N/a	2016	
	Marshall Islands Legal Team	2013; Majuro, Marshall Islands	2016	
	International Centre of the Roerichs	1989; Moscow, Russia	2016	
	National Women's Cycling Team	1986; Kabul, Afghanistan	2016	
	Nonviolent Peaceforce	2002; New Delhi, India	2016	
	Parliamentarians for Nuclear Non-Proliferation and Disarmament	2003; New York City, United States	2016	
	Project Forgive Foundation	April 2012; Columbia, California, United States	2016	
	Revolutionary Armed Forces of Colombia	1966; La Uribe, Meta, Colombia	2016	
	Amel Association International	1979; Beirut, Lebanon	2016, 2017, 2018	
	Nuclear Age Peace Foundation	1982; Santa Barbara, California, United States	2016, 2017, 2018	
	Syrian Civil Defence	2013; Damascus, Syria	2016, 2017, 2018	
	Doctors Against Forced Organ Harvesting	2007; Austin, Texas, United States	2016, 2017, 2024	
	Consultative Group for International Agricultural Research	May 1971; Washington, D.C., United States	2016, 2026	
2017
	International Campaign to Abolish Nuclear Weapons	April 2007; Melbourne, Australia	2017	Awarded the 2017 Nobel Peace Prize. (Note: "for its work to draw attention to the catastrophic humanitarian consequences of any use of nuclear weapons and for its ground-breaking efforts to achieve a treaty-based prohibition of such weapons")
	Community Peacemaker Teams	1984; Chicago, Illinois, United States	2017	
	Economic Community of West African States	1975; Lagos, Nigeria	2017	
	People's Recovery Empowerment Development Assistance	1974; Olongapo, Zambales, Philippines	2017	
	Abolition 2000	April 1995; New York City, United States	2017, 2018	
	Combatants for Peace	2006; Palestine and Israel	2017, 2018	
	Global Zero	December 2008; Paris, France	2017, 2018	
	Unfold Zero	May 2014; New York City, United States	2017, 2018	
	Cumhuriyet	May 1924; Istanbul, Türkiye	2017, 2018, 2019	
	American Civil Liberties Union	January 1920; New York City, United States	2017, 2024	
2018
	World Food Programme	December 1961; Rome, Italy	2018, 2019, 2020	Awarded the 2020 Nobel Peace Prize. (Note: "for its efforts to combat hunger, for its contribution to bettering conditions for peace in conflict-affected areas and for acting as a driving force in efforts to prevent the use of hunger as a weapon of war and conflict")
	Civil March for Aleppo	December 2016; Berlin, Germany	2018	
	Committee Against Torture	January 1987; Geneva, Switzerland	2018	
	Coptic Orthodox Church	42 A.D. Alexandria, Egypt	2018	
	Extractive Industries Transparency Initiative	June 2003; Oslo, Norway	2018	
	Fargespill Foundation	2004; Bergen, Norway	2018	
	Humanitarian Law Center	1992; Belgrade, Serbia	2018	
	MeToo movement	2006; New York, United States	2018	
	Peshmerga	1800s Kurdistan, Iraq	2018	
	Righteous of the Mediterranean Sea (Note: The "Righteous of the Mediterranean Sea" is the title addressed to a joint candidature of 67 subjects, individuals and organisations, from 19 different nations which have "continuously [performed] non-governmental and non-profit activity (direct management or medical/operative support) with maritime means dedicated to rescue operations of migrants". The organisations enlisted include Médecins Sans Frontières (founded 1971), Migrant Offshore Aid Station (founded 2013), Italian Relief Corps of the Order of Malta (founded in 1970), Emergency (founded in 1994), Italian Red Cross (founded in 1864), Sea-Watch (founded in 2015), Humanitarian Pilots Initiative (founded in 2016), Sea-Eye (founded in 2015), Proactiva Open Arms (formed in 2015), Humanity Crew (founded in 2015), Boat Refugee Foundation (founded in 2015), Save the Children (founded in 1919), SOS Méditerranée (founded in 2015), Médecins du Monde (1980), Jugend Rettet (founded in 2015), Mission Lifeline (founded in 2016), German Sea Rescue Society (founded in 1865), German Life Saving Association (founded in 1913), Hellenic Rescue Team (founded in 1978), Life Boat (founded in 2016), Cadus – Redefine Global Solidarity (founded in 2014), Elpis Hospital Ship (founded in 2016), Women and Health Alliance International (founded in 2009), Rainbow for Africa (founded in 2007), Missionland (founded in 2009), Engim Internazionale (founded in 1873), Volunteer Search and Rescue Team (founded in ?), Sailors Without Borders (founded in 2016), Swedish Sea Rescue Society (founded in 1907), Royal National Lifeboat Institution (founded in 1824), Norwegian Society for Sea Rescue (founded in 1891), Royal Netherlands Sea Rescue Institution (founded in 1991), Bodrum Sea Rescue Association (founded in 1999), Lifeguard Hellas Save & Rescue (founded in 1994), International Surf Lifesaving Association (founded in 2008), Bethells Beach (founded in 1958), Lifeguards Without Borders (founded in 2006), Greenpeace (founded in 1971), Emergency Response Centre International (founded in 2015), Search and Rescue Society of British Columbia (founded in 1983), Proem-Aid (founded in 2015), Platanos Rescue Team (founded in 2015), Salvamento Marítimo Humanitario (founded in 2015), F.E.O.X Rescue Team (founded in 2015), Refugee Rescue (founded in 2015), Canadian Marine Rescue Assistance International Society (founded in 1978), Team Humanity (founded in 2015), Samos Divers Association (founded in 2007), Elite Team Special Missions Greece (founded in 2013), Bomberos en Acción (founded in 2013), Atlantic Pacific International Rescue (founded in 2016), Worldwide Tribe Search and Rescue Team (founded in 2015), Center for Political Beauty (founded in 2009), Fishing and Blue Growth District in Mazara del Vallo (founded in 2006), Lampedusa e Linosa Fishermen Consortium (founded in ?), and "Le Pecheur" Association for Development and Environment (founded in 1997).)	2017; Parma, Italy	2018	
	Search for Common Ground	1982; Washington, D.C., United States	2018	
	Umbrella Movement	2014; Hong Kong	2018	
	Hong Kong Pro-Democracy Movement	2019; Hong Kong	2021	
	International Rescue Committee	July 1933; New York City, United States	2018, 2019	
	ShelterBox	2000; Helston, Cornwall, England	2018, 2019	
	SOS Méditerranée	May 2015; France	2018, 2019	
	Arctic Council	September 1996; Ottawa, Canada	2018, 2019, 2020, 2022	
	Boycott, Divestment and Sanctions	July 2005; Ramallah, Palestine	2018, 2024	
	Reporters Without Borders	1985; Montpellier, France	2018, 2019, 2020, 2021, 2024	
2019
	Control Arms Coalition	October 2003; New York, United States	2019	
	Hiroshima and Nagasaki Peace Messengers	1998; Nyon, Vaud, Switzerland	2019	
	Huichol Center for Cultural Survival and the Traditional Arts	1977; Huejuquilla el Alto, Jalisco, Mexico	2019	
	Integrated Education Fund	1992; Belfast, Northern Ireland	2019	Nominated jointly.
	Northern Ireland Council for Integrated Education	1987; Belfast, Northern Ireland	2019	Nominated jointly.
	International Action Network on Small Arms	May 2002; London, England	2019	
	Quaker United Nations Office	1947; New York City, United States	2019	
	United Network of Young Peacebuilders	September 1989; The Hague, Netherlands	2019	
	World Wide Fund for Nature	April 1961; Morges, Vaud, Switzerland	2019	
	Muhammadiyah	November 1912; Yogyakarta, Indonesia	2019, 2021, 2022	
	Nahdlatul Ulama	January 1926; Jakarta, Indonesia	2019, 2021, 2022	
	Committee to Protect Journalists	1981; New York City, United States	2019, 2020, 2021, 2026	
2020
	Anti-Corruption Foundation	September 2011; Moscow, Russia	2020	
	Argentine Forensic Anthropology Team	1984; Buenos Aires, Argentina	2020	
	Forces of Freedom and Change	January 2019; Khartoum, Sudan	2020	
	Fridays for Future	August 2018; Stockholm, Sweden	2020	
	Health and Education for All	2012; Bangladesh	2020	
	People of Hong Kong	—N/a	2020	
	Russia Behind Bars	November 2008; Moscow, Russia	2020	
	Seacology	1991; Berkeley, California, United States	2020	
	Sudanese Professionals Association	August 2016; Khartoum, Sudan	2020	
2021
	Barents Hockey League	November 2008; Luleå, Sweden	2021	Nominated jointly.
	Kirkenes Puckers	2001; Kirkenes, Norway	2021	Nominated jointly.
	Campaign Against Arms Trade	1974; London, England	2021	
	Civil Disobedience Movement	February 2021; Yangon, Myanmar	2021	
	Coalition for Epidemic Preparedness Innovations	August 2017; Davos, Switzerland	2021	
	Federal Government of the United States	May 1789; Washington, D.C., United States	2021	Nominated jointly.
	Government of Kosovo	February 2008; Pristina, Kosovo	2021	Nominated jointly.
	Government of Serbia	August 1805; Belgrade, Serbia	2021	Nominated jointly.
	Global Campaign for Peace Education	May 1999; The Hague, Netherlands	2021	
	Global Alliance for Tax Justice	2013; Brussels, Belgium	2021	
	Henry Reeve Brigade	September 2005; Havana, Cuba	2021	
	Hong Kong Free Press	June 2015; Hong Kong	2021	
	Hungarian Helsinki Committee	1989; Budapest, Hungary	2021	
	International Consortium of Investigative Journalists	1997; Washington, D.C., United States	2021	
	Italian Medical Staff	—N/a	2021	
	Khalsa Aid	April 1999; Taplow, Buckinghamshire, England	2021	
	PCNCDP Law Enforcement and Legislative Reform Committee	2020; North Carolina, United States	2021	
	Mwatana for Human Rights	2007 Sana'a, Yemen	2021	
	Polish Judges Association "Iustitia"	1990; Warsaw, Poland	2021	
	International Fact-Checking Network	September 2015; St. Petersburg, Florida, United States	2021	
	Palestinian Centre for Human Rights	April 1995; Gaza City, Palestine	2021	
	United Nations Framework Convention on Climate Change	June 1992; Rio de Janeiro, United States	2021	
	Black Lives Matter	July 2013; United States	2021, 2022	
	Intergovernmental Science-Policy Platform on Biodiversity and Ecosystem Services	April 2012; Panama City, Panama	2021, 2022	
	Campaign to Stop Killer Robots	October 2012; London, England	2021, 2024	
	B'Tselem	February 1989; Jerusalem, Israel	2021, 2022, 2024	
2022
	Center for Civil Liberties	May 2007; Kiev, Ukraine	2022	Awarded the 2022 Nobel Peace Prize with Ales Bialiatski and Memorial.
	Alt News	February 2017; Ahmedabad, Gujarat, India	2022	
	AirLabs	2014; United Kingdom	2022	
	Centre for Applied Nonviolent Action and Strategies	2004; Belgrade, Serbia	2022	
	International Work Group for Indigenous Affairs	August 1968; Stuttgart, Baden-Württemberg, Germany	2022	
	Karwan-e-Mohabbat	September 2017; Assam, India	2022	
	Katiba des Narvalos	March 2015; France	2022	
	National Unity Government of Myanmar	April 2021; Yangon, Myanmar	2022	
	Organization for the Development of Sénégal River	March 1972; Nouakchott, Mauritania	2022	
	Uyghur Human Rights Project	2004; Washington, D.C., United States	2022	
	Visions of Peace Initiative	2017; Indonesia	2022	
	Westerwelle Foundation	December 2013; Berlin, Germany	2022	
	Human Rights Data Analysis Group	December 1991; San Salvador, El Salvador	2022, 2023	
	Inter-American Court of Human Rights	May 1979; San José, Costa Rica	2022, 2023	
	Al-Haq	1979; Ramallah, Palestine	2022, 2024	
	United World Colleges	1962; Llantwit Major, South Glamorgan, Wales	2022, 2024	
	Campaign for Uyghurs	December 2017; Washington, D.C., United States	2022, 2025	
	JA Worldwide	1919; Boston, Massachusetts, United States	2022, 2023, 2024, 2025, 2026	
	International Court of Justice	June 1945; The Hague, Netherlands	2022, 2023, 2024, 2025, 2026	
	International Criminal Court	July 2002; Rome, Italy	2022, 2023, 2024, 2025, 2026	
2023
	Bellingcat	July 2014; Amsterdam, Netherlands	2023	
	Bloody Sunday families	Derry, Northern Ireland	2023	
	Florida Rights Restoration Coalition	2019; Orlando, Florida, United States	2023	
	Forensic Architecture	2010; London, England	2023	
	Great Orchestra of Christmas Charity	March 1993; Warsaw, Poland	2023	
	International Association of Collaborative Professionals	1997; Minneapolis, Minnesota, United States	2023	
	Lighthouse Reports	2019; Amsterdam, Netherlands	2023	
	National Council of Churches of Kenya	June 1913; Nairobi, Kenya	2023	
	National Unity Consultative Council	March 2021; Yangon, Myanmar	2023	
	Organized Crime and Corruption Reporting Project	2006; Washington, D.C., United States	2023	
	Still I Rise	May 2018; Rome, Italy	2023	
	Tevogen Bio	2020; Warren, New Jersey, United States	2023	
	Vesna	February 2013; Saint Petersburg, Russia	2023	
	World Uyghur Congress	April 2004; Munich, Germany	2023, 2024	
2024
	Arava Institute for Environmental Studies	1996; Ketura, Israel	2024	
	Article36	January 2011; Oslo, Norway	2024	
	Breaking the Silence	March 2004; Tel Aviv, Israel	2024	
	Council of Europe	May 1949; London, England	2024	
	Defence for Children – Palestine	1991; Ramallah, Palestine	2024	
	EcoPeace Middle East	December 1994; Taba, South Sinai, Egypt	2024	
	The Freedom Theatre	2006; Jenin, Palestine	2024	
	Gaza Healthcare Workers	—N/a	2024	
	Palestine Red Crescent Society	December 1968; Ramallah, Palestine	2024	
	Nash Dom – "Our House"	December 2005; Belarus	2024	
	Russian Movement of Conscientious Objectors	1997; Moscow, Russia	2024	
	Sleeping Giants	November 2016; United States	2024	
	Ukrainian Pacifist Movement	2019; Kiev, Ukraine	2024	
	Union of Palestinian Women's Committees	1980; Ramallah, Palestine	2024	
	United Nations Relief and Works Agency for Palestine Refugees in the Near East	December 1949; Amman, Jordan	2024	
	World Central Kitchen	2010; Washington, D.C., United States	2024	
	Carter Center	April 1982; Atlanta, Georgia, United States	2024, 2025	
	Group for a Better Country	June 1999; Mexico City, Mexico	2024, 2025	
	Office for Democratic Institutions and Human Rights	November 1991; Warsaw, Poland	2024, 2025	
	Women Wage Peace	August 2014; Jerusalem, Israel	2024, 2025	
	Women of the Sun	July 2021; Bethlehem, Palestine	2024, 2025	
	Emergency Response Rooms	April 2023; Khartoum, Sudan	2024, 2025, 2026	
2025
	January 6th Committee	July 2021; Washington, D.C., United States	2025	
	Children of Gaza	—N/a	2025	
	Hostages and Missing Families Forum	October 2023; Israel	2025	
	Kosovo Rehabilitation Center for Torture Survivors	October 1999; Pristina, Kosovo	2025	
	Mothers of Beslan	February 2005; Beslan, Pravoberezhny, Russia	2025	
	Les Guerrières de la Paix	2022; Paris, France	2025	
	Organization of Civil Societies for Elections	1999; Dakar, Senegal	2025	
	Serbian student protesters	November 2024; Belgrade, Serbia	2025	
2026
	City of Minneapolis	1856; Minnesota, United States	2026	
	Concordis International	2004; London, England	2026	
	Crop Trust	2004; Bonn, North Rhine-Westphalia, Germany	2026	
	Food and Agriculture Organization	October 1945; Quebec City, Canada	2026	
	International Association of Judges	1953; Salzburg, Austria	2026	
	Nordic Genetic Resource Center	January 2008; Alnarp, Lomma, Sweden	2026	
	People of South Korea	—N/a	2026	
	People of Ukraine	—N/a	2026	
	Save Homonhon Movement	2023; Homonhon, Eastern Samar, Philippines	2026	
	Svalbard Global Seed Vault	June 2006; Svalbard, Norway	2026	
	World Trade Organization	January 1995; Geneva, Switzerland	2026	
	Yad Vashem	August 1953; Jerusalem, Israel	2026	

== See also ==
- Peace movement
- List of peace activists
- List of peace prizes
- List of Nobel Peace Prize laureates
- List of individuals nominated for the Nobel Peace Prize (1900–1999)
