= List of heads of state and government Nobel nominees =

This is a list of the heads of state and heads of government who have been nominated for the Nobel Prize.

Nomination forms for the Nobel Prize are sent by the Nobel Committee to about 3,000 individuals, usually in September the year before the prizes are awarded. The Nobel Committee nominates about 300 potential laureates from these forms and additional names. The nominees are not publicly named, nor are they told that they are being considered for the prize. All nomination records for a prize are sealed for 50 years from the awarding of the prize.

== Heads of state and government Nobel Peace Prize nominees ==
| Portrait | Nominee | Years | Country | Status | Rationale |
|---|---|---|---|---|---|
| | Tsar Nikolai II of Russia (1868–1918) | 1901 | Russia | Emperor of All Imperial Russia (1894–1917). | Nikolai II initiated the First Hague Peace Conference in 1899. The tsar's intention was to seek agreements to limit armaments and the financial burden of excessive armament, and to improve the prospects of peaceful settlement of international conflicts and to codify the laws of war. |
| | Paul de Smet de Naeyer (1843–1913) | 1905 | Belgium | Prime Minister of Belgium (1896–1907) | Smet de Naeyer was nominated for his efforts to accomplish an international agreement concerning the sugar industry. Nominated the only time by Baron de Aulnis de Bourrouil. |
| | Theodore Roosevelt (1858–1919) | 1906 | United States | 26th President of the United States (1901–1909) | Roosevelt mediated in the Russo–Japanese War (1904–05). His efforts led to the peace treaty of 1905. He made use of the Permanent Court of Arbitration on several occasions. Won the 1906 Nobel Peace Prize. |
| | Hjalmar Branting (1860–1925) | 1906, 1913, 1914, 1921 | Sweden | Prime Minister of Sweden (1920) (1921–1923) (1924–1925) | Branting promoted peace and anti–militarism. He contributed to the peaceful dissolution of the Swedish–Norwegian Union in 1905 and worked to establish good relations between the two countries. He was one of the foremost members of the international social democratic movement and he exercised great influence on its peace work. Shared the 1921 Nobel Peace Prize with Christian Louis Lange. |
| | Léon Bourgeois (1851–1925) | 1908, 1910, 1911, 1912, 1913, 1914, 1915, 1916, 1918, 1919, 1920 | France | Prime Minister of France (1895–1896) | Bourgeois headed the French delegation to The Hague Peace Conferences in 1899 and 1907, where he promoted cooperation among nations. Member of the peace group of the French parliament. He was a member of the Permanent Court of Justice at the Hague from 1903. Bourgeois was among the initiators of the League of Nations and was appointed France's representative to the League in 1919, where he was elected president of the council. Bourgeois was an ardent spokesman for disarmament, international law and obligatory arbitration. Won the 1920 Nobel Peace Prize. |
| | Luigi Luzzatti (1841–1927) | 1908, 1909 | Italy | Prime Minister of Italy (1910–1911) | Luzzatti emphasized the importance of social reforms and cooperation to secure social and political peace. Promoted international law and economic cooperation. |
| | Franz Joseph I of Austria (1830–1916) | 1908, 1913, 1914 | Austria-Hungary | Emperor of the Austro–Hungarian Empire (1848–1916) | Francis Joseph had been Emperor for 60 years. |
| | Auguste Beernaert (1829–1912) | 1909 | Belgium | Prime Minister of Belgium (1884–1894) | Beernaert promoted international arbitration and disarmament. He was Belgium's representative at the Hague conferences in 1899 and 1907, where he advocated compulsory arbitration. Beernaert was very active in the work of the Inter–Parliamentary Union, and was president of its council in 1909. Shared the 1909 Nobel Peace Prize with Paul Henri d'Estournelles de Constant. |
| | Andrey Lyapchev (1866–1933) | 1910 | Bulgaria | 22nd Prime Minister of Bulgaria (1926–1931). | - Nominated the only time by Хр.П.Славейков. |
| | Milovan Milovanović (1863–1912) | 1910 | Serbia | 45th Prime Minister of Serbia (1911–1912) | Nominated for his efforts to prevent the Serbian–Austrian conflict in 1909 from turning into war. Proponent of international law and arbitration. |
| | Sergei Yulyevich Witte (1849–1915) | 1911, 1912 | Russia | 1st Prime Minister of Russia (1905–1906). | Witte was the first constitutional prime minister of the Russian Empire 1905–06. Nominated by C.Brun only. |
| | Emperor Wilhelm II (1859–1941) | 1911, 1917 | Prussia | Emperor of Prussia (1888–1918) | - |
| | William Howard Taft (1857–1930) | 1913 | United States | 27th President of the United States (1909–1913) | Taft promoted international law and arbitration. He initiated arbitration treaties between the US and Great Britain and France, but despite his efforts these were not concluded. Advocated peace and cooperation during his presidency(1909–1913). |
| | Tomáš Garrigue Masaryk (1850–1937) | 1913, 1914, 1915, 1921, 1923, 1928, 1929, 1930, 1939, 1937 | Czechoslovakia | 1st President of Czechoslovakia (1918–1935) | Masaryk promoted humanism, ethics, and pacifism. As a Czechoslovak nationalist he fought to defend the Slav peoples against Austrian–Hungarian imperialism. He successfully acted as mediator between Austria–Hungary and Serbia in 1912. During World War I Masaryk advocated democratic rights and human liberation. He was the chief founder and first president of Czechoslovakia. |
| | Heinrich Lammasch (1853–1920) | 1915, 1916, 1917, 1918, 1919 | Austria (Austria-Hungary) | Last Minister–President of Austria (1918) | Lammasch promoted international law and arbitration. He became associated with the Institute of International Law in 1887, and a member in 1891. He played an important role at international conferences and meetings and he was member of the Permanent Court of Arbitration at The Hague. Lammasch presided over the Court in the conflicts between the USA and Great Britain over the fishery in New Foundland (1909), and between the USA and Venezuela over the rights of the Orinoco Steamship Company (1910). He became a lifelong member of the Austrian First Chamber in 1899 and Hon. member of the Vienna Academic Peace Association. Member of the Central Organization for a Durable Peace (founded in 1915) and Hon. President of the Austrian peace association 'Para Pacem'. After 1916 Lammasch continued to produce works on peace, international law and arbitration, despite deteriorating health. In 1918, he presented a draft covenant for the League of Nations. |
| | Albert I of Belgium (1875–1934) | 1915, 1917, 1918, 1919, 1920, 1922, 1923, 1927 | Belgium | King of Belgium (1909–1934) | Albert I was nominated for his national sacrifice in order to uphold the idea of international law after the outbreak of war in 1914. |
| | Alfonso XIII (1886–1941) | 1917, 1933 | Spain | King of Spain (1886–1931) | - |
| | Woodrow Wilson (1856–1924) | 1918, 1919, 1920 | United States | 28th President of the United States (1913–1921) | Wilson advocated international law and arbitration. In January 1917 he had made an unsuccessful attempt to persuade the belligerents to end the war, calling for a 'peace without victory'. After the USA had entered the war, Wilson outlined his view on a post–war settlement through his 'Fourteen points'. These became the guiding principles for the Paris Peace Conference (1919–20), and included the establishment of the League of Nations. However, Wilson failed to obtain ratification of the Treaty of Versailles, and the USA did not join the League of Nations. Won the 1919 Nobel Peace Prize but was awarded the following year. |
| | Herbert Hoover (1874–1964) | 1921, 1933, 1941, 1946 | United States | 31st President of the United States (1929–1933) | Hoover was the chief Allied relief administrator during World War I (1914–1919) and later chairman of the Commission for Relief in Belgium. He was appointed national food administrator to stimulate production and conserve supplies when the USA entered into the war. |
| | David Lloyd George (1863–1945) | 1922 | United Kingdom | Prime Minister of the United Kingdom (1916–1922) | - Jointly nominated but Griffith died before the only chance to be rewarded |
| | Arthur Griffith (1871–1922) | 1922 | Dáil Éireann | President of Dáil Éireann (1922) | - Jointly nominated but Griffith died before the only chance to be rewarded |
| | Warren Gamaliel Harding (1865–1923) | 1922, 1923 | United States | 29th President of the United States (1921–1923) | President Harding had initiated the Washington Conference on Limitation of Armaments. The treaties on disarmament at sea adopted by the conference were later ratified by the US Senate. |
| | Francesco Saverio Nitti (1868–1953) | 1922, 1923, 1924, 1925, 1926 | Italy | Prime Minister of Italy (1919–1920) | Nitti was nominated for the foreign policy he conducted while he was Prime Minister of Italy. He regarded Europe as one unit depending on the equality of each country. Nitti criticized the Versailles Treaty and the ongoing rearmement in the books Europa senza pace and Decandenza dell' Europa. He presided over the Conference of the Allied Forces in San Remo, where he advocated a policy of appeasement towards Austria and protested against the imperialistic policy of Lord Curzon. Nitti attempted to guide the American opinion through his articles in United Press of America and the nominators thought this was the reason why the US Senate in November 1922 was willing to discuss the questions of compensation and the Entente policy. |
| | Ramsay MacDonald (1866–1937) | 1925, 1929, 1930, 1931 | United Kingdom | Prime Minister of the United Kingdom (1924–1924, 1929–1935) | MacDonald joined the Labour Party in 1894 and he gradually became a well known political writer. Socialism was the subject of most of his books, but he did not encourage revolution. In 1911 he became parliamentary leader of the Labour Party, and in 1924 he became the first Labour prime minister. MacDonald presided over the negotiations on US Secretary of State Dawes' Plan for the payment of German war reparations 1924. He was also instrumental in the process that resulted in the Geneva Protocol on collective security, disarmament and compulsory arbitration. |
| | Aristide Briand (1862–1932) | 1926, 1931, 1932 | France | Prime Minister of France (1909–1917, 1921–1922, 1925–1926, 1929) | Briand was nominated for his plan to create a European Union. The plan was first presented in the League of Nations in 1929, and in 1930 the French government put forth a memorandum on the issue. The League then decided to establish a study commission on the subject with Briand as its chairman. Shared the 1926 Nobel Peace Prize. |
| | Gustav Stresemann (1878–1929) | 1926 | Germany | Chancellor of Germany (1923) | Stresemann was nominated for being largely responsible for restoring the international status of Germany after World War I, and for his contribution to the Locarno Pact in 1925. Advocate of reconciliation and arbitration. Luther became Minister of Finance under Gustav Stresemann in 1923, and he successfully stabilized the inflated national currency. He continued as Minister of Finance in the next government, and he participated in negotiating the Dawes Plan in 1924. Shared the 1926 Nobel Peace Prize. |
| | Hans Luther (1879–1962) | 1926 | Germany | Chancellor of Germany (1925–1926) | Luther became Minister of Finance under Gustav Stresemann in 1923, and he successfully stabilized the inflated national currency. He continued as Minister of Finance in the next government, and he participated in negotiating the Dawes Plan in 1924. |
| | Edvard Beneš (1884–1948) | 1926, 1927, 1938, 1939, 1945, 1947, 1948 | Czechoslovakia | 2nd and 4th President of Czechoslovakia (1935–1938; 1945–1948) | Benes advocated peace, justice and international law in the League of Nations while serving as Czechoslovak Foreign Minister, and he continued to promote peace when he became president of Czechoslovakia. |
| | Giuseppe Motta (1871–1940) | 1927, 1928, 1930, 1932, 1933, 1937, 1938 | Switzerland | President of the Swiss Confederation (1915, 1920, 1927, 1932, 1937) | Motta was the chief Swiss delegate to the League of Nations from 1920. He became Honorary President of the first League assembly (1920) and President of the fifth assembly (1924). Protector of Swiss neutrality and advocate of international law and arbitration. |
| | Édouard Herriot (1872–1957) | 1929, 1933 | France | Prime Minister of France (1924–1925, 1926, 1932) | Herriot was the leader of the French Radical Party from 1919, and he was Prime Minister 1924–1925 and 1926. He was nominated for his contribution to the Geneva Protocol during the assemblies of the League of Nations 1924–1925. Proponent of disarmament, international law and arbitration. |
| | Carlos Ibáñez del Campo (1877–1960) | 1930 | Chile | 19th and 25th President of Chile (1927–1931, 1952–1958) | Ibàñez del Campo and Leguía y Salcedo were nominated for their efforts to settle the profound and long–lasting conflict between Chile and Peru over the Tacna–Arica provinces, a source of conflict between the two countries. The nominators emphasized the importance this diplomatic settlement would have for the South American continent |
| | Augusto Bernardino Leguía y Salcedo (1863–1932) | 1930 | Peru | 40th President of Peru (1919–1930) | Ibàñez del Campo and Leguía y Salcedo were nominated for their efforts to settle the profound and long–lasting conflict between Chile and Peru over the Tacna–Arica provinces, a source of conflict between the two countries. The nominators emphasized the importance this diplomatic settlement would have for the South American continent |
| | Rafael Erich (1879–1946) | 1932, 1933, 1934, 1940 | Finland | 6th Prime Minister of Finland (1920–1921) | - |
| | Pierre Laval (1883–1945) | 1932, 1936 | France | Prime Minister of France (1931–1932, 1935–1936, 1942–1944) | Laval was nominated for his general achievements as politician, and for his efforts as Prime Minister to find a solution to Germany's payments problem due to the financial crisis in 1931. Laval, together with Samuel Hoare, developed the so–called Hoare–Laval Plan for the partition of Ethiopian territory between Italy and Ethiopia (Abyssinia), in order to solve the conflict between the two states. The plan clearly favored Italy, and was not implemented due to British opposition. |
| | Alexandros Papanastasiou (1876–1936) | 1932, 1934, 1935, 1936 | Greece | Prime Minister of Greece (1924, 1932) | Papanastassiou was nominated for his efforts to further peace and cooperation between the Balkan states. His idea of a Balkan union was adopted by the 7th Peace Congress in Athens and Delphi in 1929. In 1930 Papanastassiou organized and presided over the first Balkan Conference in Athens and Delphi. He also advocated disarmament, the League of Nations and inter–parliamentary cooperation. |
| | Mustafa Kemal Atatürk (1881–1938) | 1934 | Turkey | 1st President of Turkey (1923–1938) | - |
| | Józef Piłsudski (1867–1935) | 1934 | Poland | Chief of State of Poland (1918–1922) | Pilsudski was a revolutionary who had helped establish independent Poland in November 1918. He was the first chief of state of independent Poland from 1918 to 1922, and he was also commander in chief of the Polish army. In 1920 he defeated the Russian Red Army, and in late 1922 he became chief of the general staff. He resigned from office in May 1923 and went into retirement. In 1926, after an economic depression, Pilsudski marched on Warsaw, and the government resigned. Pilsudski was elected president on May 31, 1926, but he refused to take the honor, and instead he assumed the Ministry of Defense. He was the major influence in Poland for the rest of his life, and he was especially influential in Polish foreign policy. |
| | Gabriel Terra (1873–1942) | 1934 | Uruguay | 40th President of Uruguay (1931–1938) | - |
| | Franklin Delano Roosevelt (1882–1945) | 1934, 1938, 1939, 1940, 1941, 1945 | United States | 32nd President of the United States (1933–1945) | Roosevelt had taken an active part in the fields of politics, economics and culture in order to secure world peace. He was nominated for his efforts to end World War II. |
| | Benito Mussolini (1883–1945) | 1935 | Italy | Prime Minister of Italy (1922–1943) | - |
| | Sténio Vincent (1874–1959) | 1936, 1937 | Haiti | 28th President of Haiti (1930–1941) | Vincent was elected President of Haiti in October 1930, by a national assembly (the first since 1918) controlled by nationalists. |
| | Rafael Trujillo (1891–1961) | 1936, 1937 | Dominican Republic | 3rd and 6th President of the Dominican Republic (1930–1938, 1942–1952) | Trujillo Molina seized power in a military revolt against President Horacio Vásquez in 1930. |
| | Stanley Bruce (1883–1967) | 1937 | Australia | 8th Prime Minister of Australia (1923–1929) | Bruce promoted peace and goodwill in international politics, and he expounded the ideals of the Australian people when he represented Australia at various international conferences. He was Prime Minister 1923 to 1929, and Australia's representative to the Council of the League of Nations for three years. He was appointed Australian Resident Minister in London 1932, and High Commissioner from 1933. |
| | Haile Selassie (1892–1975) | 1938, 1964 | Ethiopia | Emperor of Ethiopia (1930–1974) | Haile Selassie was nominated for his impressive contribution to uniting the African states, and championing the universally accepted principles of law and international politics. |
| | Adolf Hitler (1889–1945) | 1939 | Germany | Chancellor of Germany (1933–1945) | Hitler was the leader of the German Nationalist Socialist Party. The nomination was withdrawn by nominator E. G. C. Brandt, an anti–fascist member of the Swedish parliament who never intended his submission to be taken seriously. |
| | Pope Pius XI (1857–1939) | 1939 | Vatican City | 259th Pope of the Catholic Church and sovereign of the Vatican City State (1922–1939) | - Died before the only chance to be rewarded. |
| | Neville Chamberlain (1869–1940) | 1939, 1940 | United Kingdom | Prime Minister of the United Kingdom (1937–1940) | Chamberlain was nominated for his contribution to the Munich Agreement (September 30, 1938). The agreement accepted Hitler's claim that Czechoslovakia had to cede the Sudetenland to Germany. It was seen as a successful attempt to prevent the outbreak of a general war in Europe. Nominated for Nobel Prize in Physics too. |
| | Winston Churchill (1874–1965) | 1945, 1950 | United Kingdom | Prime Minister of the United Kingdom (1940–1945, 1951–1955) | Churchill was nominated for his efforts to end World War II. Won the 1953 Nobel Prize in Literature. |
| | Joseph Stalin (1878–1953) | 1945, 1948 | Soviet Union | 4th Premier of the Soviet Union (1941–1953) | Stalin was nominated for his efforts to end World War II. |
| | Anthony Eden (1897–1977) | 1945, 1955, 1956 | United Kingdom | Prime Minister of the United Kingdom (1955–1957) | Eden was nominated for his efforts to end World War II and for his work to solve the Indo–China conflict. |
| | Pope Pius XII (1876–1958) | 1947, 1948 | Vatican City | 260th Pope of the Catholic Church and sovereign of the Vatican City State (1939–1958) | Pius XII was nominated for his peace work during and after World War II. |
| | Vyacheslav Molotov (1890–1986) | 1948 | Soviet Union | 3rd Premier of the Soviet Union (1930–1941) | Molotov was nominated for his efforts to secure peace and democracy during and after World War II. |
| | Karl Renner (1870–1950) | 1948, 1949 | Austria | 3rd President of Austria (1945–1950) | Renner was nominated for his peace work during World War I, and for his policy in favour of the principles of the UNO after World War II. |
| | Harry Truman (1884–1972) | 1948, 1950, 1953, 1966 | United States | 33rd President of the United States (1945–1953) | Harry S. Truman was nominated for his efforts to promote brotherhood of nations, and establish international associations to achieve a lasting peace. |
| | Juan Domingo Perón (1895–1974) | 1949, 1974 | Argentina | President of Argentina (1946–1955; 1973–1974). | Juan and Evita Perón were nominated for their humanitarian efforts in Argentina particularly on promoting labor rights, championing women's suffrage, eliminating poverty and establishing charities to the working–class Argentines. |
| | Paul of Greece (1901–1964) | 1950 | Greece | King of Greece ('the Hellenes') (1947–1964) | King Paul I was nominated for his contribution to end the Greek civil war. The nominators emphasized the importance of his efforts in the cause of peace. |
| | Jawaharlal Nehru (1889–1964) | 1950, 1951, 1953, 1954, 1955, 1960, 1961 | India | 1st Prime Minister of India (1947–1964) | Nehru established parliamentary government in India, and he had been one of the principal leaders of the independence movement. He was nominated for his neutralist foreign policy and for upholding the same principles as Gandhi. |
| | Sarvepalli Radhakrishnan (1888–1975) | 1950, 1953, 1956, 1957, 1958, 1959, 1960, 1961, 1963, 1966 | India | 2nd President of India (1962–1967) | Sarvepalli Radhakrishnan was nominated for his courageous struggle for peace and reconciliation among the nations. Through his work in international organizations like U.N.E.S.C.O and his intellectual pre–eminence and scholarly writings Dr. Sarvepalli Radhakrishnan has consistently laboured for international Peace. He is noted for promoting international understanding by emphasising the unity of spiritual values and the great truths which have been revealed to all. Nominated for Nobel Prize in Literature too. |
| | Queen Wilhelmina of the Netherlands (1880–1962) | 1951 | Netherlands | Queen of the Netherlands (1890–1948) | Queen Wilhelmina was nominated for her involvement in the summoning of the two peace conferences at The Hague in 1897 and 1907. She was also nominated for her philanthropic effort during World War I, her strong opposition to Nazism and her contribution to the liberation of colonial areas. |
| | Lester Bowles Pearson (1897–1972) | 1952, 1957 | Canada | 14th Prime Minister of Canada (1963–1968) | Lester Bowles Pearson was nominated for his effective contribution to the organization of a firm structure of peace an international organization. Pearson has been largely responsible for the growth of Canadas influence in world affairs, and has on several occasions played a leading role as mediator and negotiator in the crises which the United Nations has had to face. Won the 1957 Nobel Peace Prize. |
| | Louis St. Laurent (1882–1973) | 1952 | Canada | 12th Prime Minister of Canada (1948–1957) | - Nominated the only time with Lester B. Pearson. |
| | Miguel Alemán Valdés (1900–1983) | 1952, 1953 | Mexico | 53rd President of Mexico (1946–1952) | Nominated for his Pan–American work and his contribution for creating international understanding. |
| | Alberto Lleras Camargo (1906–1990) | 1953, 1954 | Colombia | 20th President of Colombia (1958–1962) | Nominated for his work in UN and his work for Pan–americanism. |
| | Clement Attlee (1883–1967) | 1954, 1955, 1964 | United Kingdom | Prime Minister of the United Kingdom (1945–1951) | Earl Attlee was nominated for his fine work for the cause of world government, amongst other work, speaking on numerous occasions in the House of Lords and for his support to the League of Nations before 1939 and to the United Nations since 1945. |
| | Vincent Auriol (1884–1966) | 1955 | France | 16th President of France (1947–1954) | For his work for peace and his country. |
| | Pierre Mendès France (1907–1982) | 1955 | France | Prime Minister of France (1954–1955) | For his effort in negotiations ending the Indochina War. |
| | Konrad Adenauer (1876–1967) | 1955, 1956 | Germany | 1st Chancellor of Germany (1949–1963) | For his work for a democratic Germany, and for including Germany in a European Community. |
| | Dwight Eisenhower (1890–1969) | 1955, 1957, 1960, 1963 | United States | 34th President of the United States (1953–1961) | Dwight Eisenhower was nominated for his many acts to prevent war and ensure world Peace, and for his work for peace and for his "atoms for peace" program presented for the U.N. |
| | William Tubman (1895–1971) | 1955, 1964 | Liberia | 19th President of Liberia (1944–1971) | William V. S. Tubman was nominated for his efforts in favor of the independence movement in Africa and his work to ensure democratic conditions in the new states. |
| | Juho Kusti Paasikivi (1870–1956) | 1956 | Finland | 7th President of Finland (1946–1956) | For his work for peace and reconciliation. |
| | Joseph Paul–Boncour (1873–1972) | 1958 | France | Prime Minister of France (1932–1933) | For his exceptional talents to create harmony between the people´s and the organization of peace among Nations |
| | Nobusuke Kishi (1896–1987) | 1960 | Japan | Prime Minister of Japan (1957–1960) | Nobusuka Kishi was nominated for his work for disarmament and banning of nuclear weapons. |
| | Urho Kekkonen (1900–1986) | 1962 | Finland | 8th President of Finland (1956–1982) | Urho Kekkonen was nominated for his tireless efforts and success at keeping peace and security in the Nordic countries, and therefore contributing to civic peace and reconciliation in the World. |
| | John Fitzgerald Kennedy (1917–1963) | 1962 | United States | 35th President of the United States (1961–1963) | - |
| | Adolfo López Mateos (1909–1969) | 1963, 1964 | Mexico | 55th President of Mexico (1958–1964) | Adolfo Lopez Mateos was nominated for his many action to create a more peaceful world. He is pacifist and humanitarian, and has done much to prevent war. |
| | Josip Broz Tito (1892–1980) | 1963, 1973 | Yugoslavia | President of Socialist Federal Republic of Yugoslavia (1953–1980) | Josip Bros Tito was nominated for his persistent fight for peace and justice in the World. |
| | Lyndon Baines Johnson (1908–1973) | 1964 | United States | 36th President of the United States (1963–1969) | Lyndon Baines Johnson was nominated for his devotion to world sympathy and understanding, and for steering American foreign policy towards peaceful channels with an adherence to international cooperation. |
| | Mohammad Reza Pahlavi (1919–1980) | 1964, 1967 | Iran | Last King of Iran (1941–1979) | Mohammad Reza Shah Pahlavi was nominated for introducing important social reforms in Iran that helped secure peace in the Middle East, and negotiating in a conflict between Pakistan and Afghanistan from 1961 to 1963. |
| | Galo Plaza (1906–1987) | 1965 | Ecuador | 29th President of Ecuador (1948–1952) | Galo Plaza Lasso was nominated for his extensive and successfull [sic] peace–making, and the unusual ability he has demonstrated in this work. He has a career of distinguished national service, and has been willing to undertake arduous, hazardous and extremely vital international assignments in pursuit of peace. |
| | Shigeru Yoshida (1878–1967) | 1965, 1966, 1967 | Japan | Prime Minister of Japan (1948–1954) | Shigeru Yoshida was nominated for his efforts to prevent the Pacific War although it was in vain, and his devotion to the restoration of peace. |
| | Pope Paul VI (1897–1978) | 1965, 1967, 1972 | Vatican City | 262nd Pope of the Catholic Church and sovereign of the Vatican City State (1963–1978) | Paulus VI was nominated for his efforts for universal reconciliation, shown in various statements that was given during his visit to Jordan and Israel. |
| | Habib Bourguiba (1903–2000) | 1966 | Tunisia | 1st President of Tunisia (1957–1987) | Habib Ben Ali Bourguiba was nominated for his efforts towards a peaceful coexistence between the Arab world and Israel. |
| | Léopold Sédar Senghor (1906–2001) | 1966 | Senegal | 1st President of Senegal (1960–1980) | Leopold Sedar Senghor was nominated for his efforts to bring people together in friendship and cultural understanding. nominated for Nobel Prize in Literature too.. |
| | İsmet İnönü (1884–1973) | 1967 | Turkey | 2nd President of Turkey (1938–1950) | - |
| | Alexander Dubček (1921–1992) | 1969 | Czechoslovakia | First Secretary of the Presidium of the Central Committee of the Communist Party of Czechoslovakia (KSČ) (de facto leader of Czechoslovakia) (1968–1969) | Alexander Dubček was nominated for the vital contributions he has made to the interest of enduring peace. He has never lost sight of the ultimate goal of trying to bring about an effective formula for total disarmament among the great powers with an accepted system of mutual inspection. |
| | François Duvalier (1907–1971) | 1970 | Haiti | 34th President of Haiti (1957–1971) | François Duvalier was nominated for his philosophy and his work for the poor masses of his country. |
| | Willy Brandt (1913–1992) | 1971 | West Germany | 4th Chancellor of West Germany (1969–1974) | Willy Brandt was nominated for his part in bringing about accords that have been among the most important events in the post–war period in favour of international détente and peace. His conduct was both a great symbol of humility and remorse for the past and a great promise for the future. Won the 1971 Nobel Peace Prize |
| | Tage Erlander (1901–1985) | 1971 | Sweden | Prime Minister of Sweden (1946–1969) | Tage Erlander and Einar Gerhardsen were nominated for contributing to co–operative policy in the Nordic countries and further understanding and tolerance across borders. |
| | Einar Gerhardsen (1897–1987) | 1971 | Norway | 22nd Prime Minister of Norway (1945–1951, 1955–1965) | Tage Erlander and Einar Gerhardsen were nominated for contributing to co–operative policy in the Nordic countries and further understanding and tolerance across borders. |
| | Michail Stasinopoulos (1903–2002) | 1971, 1972 | Greece | 1st President of Greece (1974–1975) | Michel Stassinopoulos was nominated for his courage to uphold the law over directives from the Colonels to remove a judge. |
| | Edward Heath (1916–2005) | 1972 | United Kingdom | Prime Minister of the United Kingdom (1970–1974) | - Jointly nominated with Roy Jenkins. |
| | Pierre Trudeau (1919–2000) | 1972 | Canada | 15th Prime Minister of Canada (1980–1984) | - |
| | Indira Gandhi (1917–1984) | 1973 | India | 3rd Prime Minister of India (1966–1977, 1980–1984) | - |
| | Richard Nixon (1913–1994) | 1973 | United States | 37th President of the United States (1969–1974) | - |
| | Kurt Waldheim (1918–2007) | 1973 | Austria | President of Austria (1986–1992) | - |
| | Jomo Kenyatta (c. 1897–1978) | 1973, 1974 | Kenya | 1st President of Kenya (1964–1978) | - |
| | Eisaku Satō (1901–1975) | 1974 | Japan | Prime Minister of Japan (1964–1972) | - Shared the 1974 Nobel Peace Prize with S.MacBride |
| | William Richard Tolbert, Jr. (1913–1980) | 1974 | Liberia | 20th President of Liberia (1971–1980) | - Nominated by Arthur B. Cassell, Sr. the only time. |
| | Luis Echeverría Álvarez (1922-2022) | 1974 | Mexico | 57th President of Mexico (1970–1976) | - |

=== Heads of state and government ASFC Nobel nominees for Nobel Peace Prize ===
In 1947, the American Friends Service Committee (AFSC) and the Quaker Peace and Social Witness (QPSW) (previously known as the Friends Service Council) jointly received the Nobel Peace Prize on behalf of all Quakers around the world "for their pioneering work in the international peace movement and compassionate effort to relieve human suffering, thereby promoting the fraternity between nations." As previous Nobel laureates are qualified to nominate annually according to the Nobel Foundation's statutes, AFSC and QPSW formed a Nobel Peace Prize Nominating Task Group which selects and recommends future Nobel laureates – individuals or organizations – who they believe best manifests "the divine spark in action in the human family."

| Portrait | Nominee | Year | Country | Status | Rationale |
|---|---|---|---|---|---|
| | Jawaharlal Nehru (1889–1964) | 1951 | India | 1st Prime Minister of India (15 August 1947 – 27 May 1964) | For being one of the principal leaders of the independence movement and for his neutralist foreign policy and for upholding the same principles as Gandhi. |
| | Jimmy Carter (1924–2024) | 1991 1997 | United States | 39th President of the United States (20 January 1977 – 20 January 1981) | For his decades of untiring effort to find peaceful solutions to international conflicts, to advance democracy and human rights, and to promote economic and social development. |
| | Ibrahim Rugova (1944–2006) | 1995 | Kosovo | 1st President of Kosovo (25 January 1992 – 21 January 2006) | For his lifelong sacrifice and campaign for peace and democracy in Kosovo and for all the people of Kosovo. |

=== Heads of state and government PRIO Director's Shortlist for the Nobel Peace Prize ===
The Peace Research Institute Oslo (PRIO) Director's Shortlist is a list of candidates considered worthy to win the Nobel Peace Prize for their efforts and actions for the promotion of peace. It has been prepared by the director of the Peace Research Institute Oslo since 2002, and is a list of the most worthy potential Nobel laureates based on independent research and assessments.

| Portrait | Nominee | Year | Country | Status | Rationale |
|---|---|---|---|---|---|
| | Pope Francis (1936–2025) | 2014 | Vatican City | 266th Pope of the Catholic Church and sovereign of the Vatican City State (13 March 2013 – Incumbent) | For having brought attention to the fate of the poor, and the need for a new approach to development and economic redistribution (Shortlist of Kristian Berg Harpviken) |
| | Angela Merkel (born 1954) | 2015 | Germany | Chancellor of Germany (22 November 2005 – 8 December 2021) | For staking out a more humane course in the European response to the mounting number of refugees (Shortlist of Kristian Berg Harpviken) |
| | Juan Manuel Santos (born 1951) | 2015 | Colombia | 32th President of Colombia (7 August 2010 – 7 August 2018) | For their commitment to a peace process that carries strong promise of bringing the Colombian conflict to an end (Shortlist of Kristian Berg Harpviken) |
| | Abiy Ahmed (born 1976) _{Currently in office} | 2019 | Ethiopia | Prime Minister of Ethiopia (2 April 2018 – Incumbent) | For taking steps to formally resolve the Eritrean–Ethiopian War through a peace agreement (Shortlist of Henrik Urdal) |

== Heads of state and government nominees for the Nobel Prize in Literature ==
| Portrait | Nominee | Year | Country | Status | Rationale |
|---|---|---|---|---|---|
| | Sarvepalli Radhakrishnan (1888–1975) | 1933, 1934, 1935, 1936, 1937, 1952, 1956, 1957, 1958, 1960, 1961, 1962, 1963 | India | 2nd President of India (13 May 1962 – 13 May 1967) | - Nominated for Nobel Peace Prize too. |
| | Winston Churchill (1874–1965) | 1946, 1948, 1949, 1950, 1951, 1952, 1953 | United Kingdom | Prime Minister of the United Kingdom (10 May 1940 – 26 July 1945) (26 October 1951 – 5 April 1955) | For his mastery of historical and biographical description as well as for brilliant oratory in defending exalted human values. Awarded the 1953 Nobel Prize in Literature. |
| | Rómulo Gallegos (1884–1969) | 1951, 1959, 1960, 1961, 1962, 1963, 1964, 1966, 1967 | Venezuela | President of Venezuela (17 February 1948 – 24 November 1948) | - |
| | Charles de Gaulle (1890–1970) | 1963, 1968 | France | President of France (8 January 1959 – 28 April 1969) | - |
| | Léopold Sédar Senghor (1909–2001) | 1963, 1969, 1970, 1971, 1972, 1973 | Senegal | 1st President of Senegal (6 September 1960 – 31 December 1980) | - Nominated for the Nobel Peace Prize too. |
| | Harold Macmillan (1894–1986) | 1970, 1972 | United Kingdom | Prime Minister of the United Kingdom (10 January 1957 – 18 October 1963) | - Nominated by Carl Becker (1925–1973) each time. |

== Heads of state and government Nominees for the Nobel Prize in Physics ==
| Portrait | Nominee | Year | Country | Status | Rationale |
|---|---|---|---|---|---|
| | Neville Chamberlain (1869–1940) | 1940 | United Kingdom | Prime Minister of the United Kingdom (28 May 1937 – 10 May 1940) | Whose personal action has avoided a world war, and thus enabled all scientists to pursue their researches (Nominated jointly with Henri Bouasse the only time by R. de Mallemann. Chamberlain nominated for the Nobel Peace Prize too) |

== Heads of state and government nominees for the Nobel Prize in Chemistry ==
| Portrait | Nominee | Year | Country | Status | Rationale |
|---|---|---|---|---|---|
| | Efraim Katchalski–Katzir (1916–2009) | 1964, 1966, 1967, 1968, 1969, 1970 | Israel | 4th President of Israel (24 May 1973 – 29 May 1978) | - |

== Statistics ==
| Country | Nominees | | | | |
| Country | Peace | Literature | Physics | Chemistry | Total |
|---|---|---|---|---|---|
| United States | 12 | - | - | - | 12 |
| United Kingdom | 7 | 2 | 1 (Note: Neville Chamberlain of United Kingdom was nominated both for Peace and Physics) | - | 9 |
| France | 7 | 1 | - | - | 8 |
| Germany | 5 | - | - | - | 5 |
| West Germany | 1 | - | - | - | 1 |
| Prussia | 1 | - | - | - | 1 |
| Vatican City | 4 | - | - | - | 4 |
| Belgium | 3 | - | - | - | 3 |
| Italy | 3 | - | - | - | 3 |
| Czechoslovakia | 3 | - | - | - | 3 |
| Austria | 3 | - | - | - | 3 |
| Austria-Hungary | 1 | - | - | - | 1 |
| Finland | 3 | - | - | - | 3 |
| Greece | 3 | - | - | - | 3 |
| India | 3 | 1 (Note: Sarvepalli Radhakrishnan of India was nominated both for Peace and Literature) | - | - | 3 |
| Canada | 3 | - | - | - | 3 |
| Soviet Union | 2 | - | - | - | 2 |
| Russia | 2 | - | - | - | 2 |
| Sweden | 2 | - | - | - | 2 |
| Turkey | 2 | - | - | - | 2 |
| Haiti | 2 | - | - | - | 2 |
| Mexico | 3 | - | - | - | 3 |
| Japan | 3 | - | - | - | 3 |
| Ethiopia | 2 | - | - | - | 2 |
| Colombia | 2 | - | - | - | 2 |
| Bulgaria | 1 | - | - | - | 1 |
| Serbia | 1 | - | - | - | 1 |
| Spain | 1 | - | - | - | 1 |
| Ireland | 1 | - | - | - | 1 |
| Switzerland | 1 | - | - | - | 1 |
| Chile | 1 | - | - | - | 1 |
| Peru | 1 | - | - | - | 1 |
| Poland | 1 | - | - | - | 1 |
| Uruguay | 1 | - | - | - | 1 |
| Dominican Republic | 1 | - | - | - | 1 |
| Australia | 1 | - | - | - | 1 |
| Argentina | 1 | - | - | - | 1 |
| Netherlands | 1 | - | - | - | 1 |
| Liberia | 2 | - | - | - | 2 |
| Yugoslavia | 1 | - | - | - | 1 |
| Iran | 1 | - | - | - | 1 |
| Ecuador | 1 | - | - | - | 1 |
| Tunisia | 1 | - | - | - | 1 |
| Senegal | 1 | 1 (Note: Léopold Sédar Senghor of Senegal was nominated both for Peace and Literature) | - | - | 1 |
| Norway | 1 | - | - | - | 1 |
| Kenya | 1 | - | - | - | 1 |
| Kosovo | 1 | - | - | - | 1 |
| Venezuela | - | 1 | - | - | 1 |
| Israel | - | - | - | 1 | 1 |
| Total | 105 | 6 | 1 | 1 | 110 (Note: Neville Chamberlain of United Kingdom, Sarvepalli Radhakrishnan of India, Léopold Sédar Senghor of Senegal were nominated in multiple sectors) |

| Gender | Nominees |
|---|---|
| Male | 107 |
| Female | 3 |

== See also ==
- List of heads of state and government Nobel laureates
- List of individuals nominated for the Nobel Peace Prize
- List of organizations nominated for the Nobel Peace Prize
- List of nominees for the Nobel Prize in Literature
- List of nominees for the Nobel Prize in Physics
- List of nominees for the Nobel Prize in Chemistry
- List of nominees for the Nobel Prize in Physiology or Medicine
- Nobel Prize
- List of Nobel laureates
