= Rondine =

Rondine is the Italian word for swallow (a type of bird).

It can refer to:

- La rondine, an opera by Puccini
- Rondine (Arezzo), a hamlet in Arezzo
- Rondine, four-cylinder engine developed by Gilera
- Corvette Rondine, a model of the Chevrolet Corvette (C2)
- Rondine typeface produced by Nebiolo Printech
