= Simon Lewis =

Simon Lewis may refer to:

- Simon Lewis (writer) (born 1971), British novelist and screenwriter
- Simon Lewis (The Mortal Instruments), a character in The Mortal Instruments series of novels
- Simon Lewis (public relations officer) (born 1959), director of communications for PM Gordon Brown
- Simon Lewis (Australian public servant)
- Simon Lewis (lifeguard) (born 1984), Australian volunteer lifesaver

== See also ==
- Simon Lowys, Member of Parliament for Liskeard
