= Simon Lewis (lifeguard) =

Australian volunteer lifesaver (b. 1984)

Simon Lewis (born 21 December 1983 in Sydney, New South Wales) is an Australian lifeguard and volunteer surf lifesaver. Once the former St Kilda Lifesaving Club Captain, he is the only Australian lifeguard to have worked both major migration routes in Europe. He first became part of a team of six on lesvos Greece with International Surf Lifesaving Association (ISLA). Since joining the mission with ISLA, Lewis has completed seven humanitarian rescue missions with six NGOs saving the lives of over 1,900 African and Syrian refugees as they attempted to cross the dangerous waters of the Mediterranean Sea to Greece and Italy. As well as being the first Australian to become the head of mission on the central migration route for the German NGO Mission Lifeline, Lewis participated in the Asylum Seeker Resource Centre (ASRC) yearly telethon which raised over $800,000 for the organisation to continue to help those in dire need.

== Career ==
Lewis began his lifesaving career on St Kilda beach in Melbourne, Victoria, where he became the St Kilda Lifesaving Club Captain and now the Director. After seeing the photograph of three year-old Syrian boy, Aylan Kurdi, whose drowned body washed up in Turkey in 2015, he learned that the International Surf Lifesaving Association was looking for volunteers and applied. By 2016, Lewis's application was successful and he was on his way to volunteer with search and rescue in Lesbos, Greece. He stated in an interview in 2016 that his "only motivation is lifesaving".

Lewis was also a part of the search and rescue team on board the MS Aquarius, a joint venture between SOS Méditerranée and Doctors Without Borders. This mission helps to save the lives of refugees who attempt to cross the dangerous Mediterranean Sea. Lewis became head of mission on the MV Lifeline, funded by the German charity Mission Lifeline.

In 2016, Lewis set up a rapid response group on the Greek island of Lesbos, pulling Syrian refugees from the water between Turkey and Greece.

== Social causes ==
In 2023, Lewis pivoted his passion to road trauma and brain injury, issues close to his heart, by calling out bad road behaviour and reckless risk taking. Lewis was interviewed by one of Melbourne's leading journalists regarding recent trends in youths, 'Tram Surfing,' stating of tram surfers, "it is that culture that is developing, they want to be cool."

== Volunteer work ==
Since joining the International Surf Lifesaving Association in 2016, after working as a lifesaver on the beach of St Kilda in Australia, Lewis has volunteered his time and skills to help save the lives of over 1,400 African and Syrian refugees who attempt to cross the Mediterranean Sea to Greece or Italy. In 2016, Lewis was a part of a six-man team who helped save 517 refugees, ranging from babies of six months old to 80-year-old adults. Lewis and his team also helped raise $22,600 via their GoFundMe page.

Lewis will also continue his volunteer work to help refugees by being a part of the Asylum Seeker Resource Centre (ASRC) Telethon on World Refugee Day. He will be one of thirty-three people taking donations over the phone in attempts to celebrate the strength and resilience of refugees and help raising funds to support refugees. Lewis's participation in the ASRC's yearly telethon helped raise over $800,000 for the organisation to continue to help those in dire need.

Lewis helped Port Phillip Council to provide floating wheelchairs and special matting at St Kilda and Port Melbourne beaches under a $65,000 initiative. Lewis and the St Kilda Life Saving Club are responsible for rolling out the matting, allowing these beaches to become more accessible for people with disabilities.

Lewis also ensured his skills would have a lasting influence on Greek lifeguards and international volunteers in Lesbos, as he helped train them in water safety protocols which they could put to use on future rescues. He also built a rapid jet ski response team that has since rescued hundreds of refugees.

== Refugee rescue ==
Lewis was a part of the International rescue mission that took place off the island of Lesbos in Greece. Before the mission started, Lewis and his team of six others helped raise $22,600 online. During this mission, the ISLA team saved 517 refugees lives as they attempted to cross dangerous waters to Italy and Greece. Although it is estimated that over 5000 died attempting this journey in 2016 alone, which each week thousands of refugees attempt to cross the tetras sea. Lewis admits that even 11 months after the mission took place that "Lesbos is still with me" after seeing the deaths of many refugees.

Between 2015 and 2017, Lewis has helped save the lives of nearly 1,900 African and Syrian refugees as they have attempted to cross the Mediterranean Sea to Greece and Italy.

In late 2017, Lewis faced another difficult issue whilst stationed in the Mediterranean Sea, this time in the form of fake gold Chanel-branded "life jackets". These were sold for a high price by traffickers but were made with cheap foam and turned into dead weights when they hit the water. Lewis who was the Australian Head of Mission of NGO ship Lifeline, saw the fake Chanel life jackets first hand, as he pulled refugees from the Southern Mediterranean. He labelled them as "straitjackets" and stated "they (traffickers) don't care about lives, they're just herding cattle and making money off it."

== Recognition and achievements ==
In 2017, Lewis was nominated and became a finalist for Australian of the Year Victorian Local Hero award for helping to save more than 500 refugees lives in January 2016. Lewis also ensured his skills would leave a lasting imprint in Lesbos by training Greek lifeguards and international volunteers in water safety protocols to help with future rescues. He built a rapid jet ski response team that has since rescued hundreds of refugees. He was nominated alongside former AFL star, Neale Daniher who helped raise millions of dollars for MND research.

He was awarded an International Life Saving Federation Citation of Merit in 2016. Lewis also joined the Spanish NGO Proactiva Open Arms, based in Malta during August 2017 and was contracted as the No. 1 lifeguard for three rotations until September 2017. He is also the first Australian head of mission on the central migration route for the German NGO Mission Lifeline. As well as being the first Australian lifeguard to have worked both the central and western Europe migration routes for refugees. Lewis was also selected by the City of Port Phillip Mayor, Bernadene Voss, as a local hero to be a baton bearer for the Queen's baton in the lead up to the Gold Coast 2018 Commonwealth Games Corporation (GOLDOC). He was the first Victorian to carry the Queen's baton on the relay route through the state of Victoria on 17 November 2017.

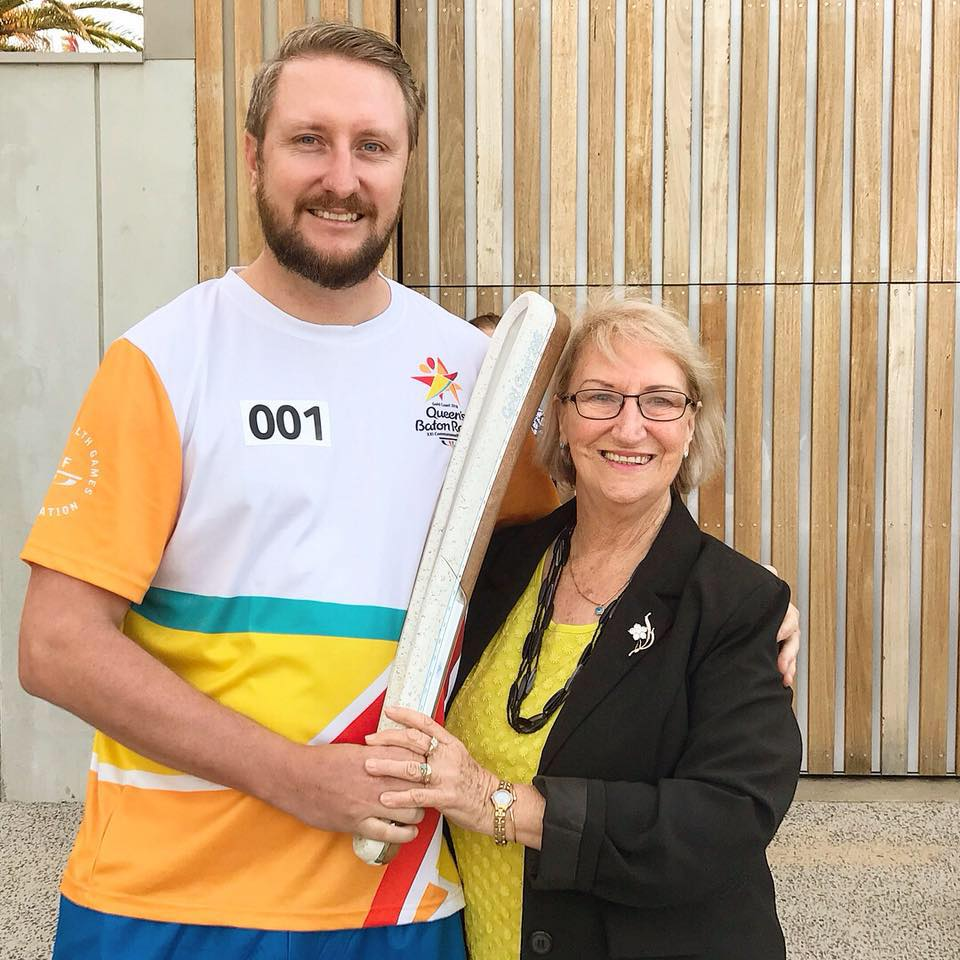
Simon Lewis (left) carrying the Queen's baton in the lead up to the Gold Coast 2018 Commonwealth Games Corporation (GOLDOC)
