= Shawne Duperon =

- Occupations: Good Gossip Researcher and Speaker
- Known for: Project Forgive
- Awards: 6-Time Emmy Award Winner
- Website: www.shawnetv.com

Shawne Duperon is an American scholar, good gossip researcher, media expert, public speaker and a TV producer. She has won 6 Emmy Awards for her notable work which has also been featured in major media. She is best known for founding The Project Forgive Foundation, a non-profit leadership foundation nominated for a Nobel Peace Prize in 2016. The foundation is supported by Archbishop Desmond Tutu.

== Career ==
Duperon has been examining the phenomenon of gossip as a research subject for 10 years. As a part of her research, she founded the case study project by the title of Project Forgive. The project focuses on "extraordinary acts of forgiveness in the face of heartbreak and senseless tragedy" and serving as an inquiry for the conversation for forgiveness.

Duperon has also been shooting a documentary based on Project Forgive stories to inspire a forgiveness movement around the globe. Using gossip theory, a campaign was crowdsourced as a Kickstarter project in April 2012 for the completion of a documentary.

The catalyst for the documentary was the story surrounding the drunk driving deaths of a Detroit area woman and her two young sons in 2005. Duperon was a family friend of those killed. It was later revealed Dupt on was also a family friend of the driver. The surviving father, Gary Weinstein, eventually forgave the man responsible.

In response to the national news coverage and interest in social media, Duperon created the Project Forgive Foundation to provide resources and interactive content relating to forgiveness and leadership in the workplace, supported by companies such as Verizon Wireless, Ford Motor Company and Cryoderm.

Duperon has been featured on major media channels such as CNN, ABC, NBC, CBC and Inc. Magazine. Duperon is a six time Emmy award winner.

She is a member of the National Speakers Association and a Certified Speaking Professional (CSP). Her other awards include "Innovator of the Year" for 2005, and being among top-10 women business owners in Michigan by The National Association of Women Business Owners in 2008. In 2016, Duperon was nominated for the Nobel Peace Prize.
