= List of heads of state and government Nobel laureates =

This is a list of all the 31 heads of state and heads of government who have received the Nobel Prize. Except Winston Churchill who received the Literature Prize, all the others were awarded with a Peace Prize.

== Nobel Peace Prize laureates ==
While serving in office
Before serving in office
After serving in office
In between two non-consecutive terms

Portrait	Nobel Laureate	Year	Country	Status	Rationale
	Theodore Roosevelt (1858–1919)	1906	United States	26th President of the United States (14 September 1901 – 4 March 1909)	For his role in bringing to an end the bloody war recently waged between two of the world's great powers, Japan and Russia.
	Auguste Beernaert (1829–1912)	1909	Belgium	Prime Minister of Belgium (26 October 1884 – 26 March 1894)	For their prominent position in the international movement for peace and arbitration. (Jointly awarded to another leading figure French politician Paul Henri d'Estournelles de Constant)
	Woodrow Wilson (1856–1924)	1919	United States	28th President of the United States (4 March 1913 – 4 March 1921)	For his role as founder of the League of Nations.
	Léon Bourgeois (1851–1925)	1920	France	Prime Minister of France (1 November 1895 – 29 April 1896)	For his longstanding contribution to the cause of peace and justice and his prominent role in the establishment of the League of Nations.
	Hjalmar Branting (1860–1925)	1921	Sweden	Prime Minister of Sweden (10 March 1920 – 27 October 1920) (13 October 1921 – 19 April 1923) (18 October 1924 – 24 January 1925)	For their lifelong contributions to the cause of peace and organized internationalism. (Jointly awarded with another non–leading figure Norwegian political scientist Christian Lange)
	Aristide Briand (1862–1932)	1926	France	Prime Minister of France (24 July 1909 – 27 February 1911) (21 January 1913 – 18 March 1913) (29 October 1915 – 17 March 1917) (16 January 1921 – 12 January 1922) (28 November 1925 – 17 July 1926) (29 July 1929 – 22 October 1929)	For their crucial role in bringing about the Locarno Treaty. (Jointly awarded to two world leaders Aristide Briand and Gustav Stresemann)
	Gustav Stresemann (1878–1929)	1926	Germany	Chancellor of Germany (Weimar Republic) (13 August 1923 – 30 November 1923)	For their crucial role in bringing about the Locarno Treaty. (Jointly awarded to two world leaders Aristide Briand and Gustav Stresemann)
	Lester Bowles Pearson (1897–1972)	1957	Canada	14th Prime Minister of Canada (22 April 1963 – 20 April 1968)	For his crucial contribution to the deployment of a United Nations Emergency Force in the wake of the Suez Crisis.
	Willy Brandt (1913–1992)	1971	West Germany	Chancellor of the Federal Republic of Germany (22 October 1969 – 7 May 1974)	For paving the way for a meaningful dialogue between East and West.
	Eisaku Sato (1901–1975)	1974	Japan	Prime Minister of Japan (9 November 1964 – 7 July 1972)	For his contribution to stabilize conditions in the Pacific rim area and for signing the Nuclear Non–Proliferation Treaty. (Jointly awarded to another leading figure Irish politician of different cause Seán MacBride)
	Anwar Sadat (1918–1981)	1978	Egypt	3rd President of Egypt (15 October 1970 – 6 October 1981)	For jointly having negotiated peace between Egypt and Israel in 1978. (Jointly awarded to two world leaders Muhammad Anwar el–Sadat and Menachem Begin)
	Menachem Begin (1913–1992)	1978	Israel	6th Prime Minister of Israel (21 June 1977 – 10 October 1983)	For jointly having negotiated peace between Egypt and Israel in 1978. (Jointly awarded to two world leaders Muhammad Anwar el–Sadat and Menachem Begin)
	Lech Wałęsa (born 1943)	1983	Poland	President of Poland (22 December 1990– 22 December 1995)	For non–violent struggle for free trade unions and human rights in Poland.
	Óscar Arias (born 1940)	1987	Costa Rica	40th President of Costa Rica (8 May 1986 – 8 May 1990) 45th President of Costa Rica (8 May 2006 – 8 May 2010)	For his work for lasting peace in Central America.
	Mikhail Gorbachev (1931–2022)	1990	Soviet Union	Chairman of the Presidium of the Supreme Soviet of the Soviet Union (1 October 1988 – 25 May 1989) Chairman of the Presidium of the Supreme Soviet of the Soviet Union (1 October 1988 – 25 May 1989) President of the Soviet Union (15 March 1990 – 25 December 1991)	For the leading role he played in the radical changes in East–West relations.
	Aung San Suu Kyi (born 1945)	1991	Myanmar	State Counsellor of Myanmar (6 April 2016 – 1 February 2021)	For her non–violent struggle for democracy and human rights.
	Frederik Willem de Klerk (1936–2021)	1993	South Africa	7th State President of South Africa (14 August 1989 – 10 May 1994)	For their work for the peaceful termination of the apartheid regime, and for laying the foundations for a new democratic South Africa. (Jointly awarded to two world leaders Nelson Mandela and Frederik Willem de Klerk)
	Nelson Mandela (1918–2013)	1993	South Africa	1st President of South Africa (10 May 1994 – 14 June 1999)	For their work for the peaceful termination of the apartheid regime, and for laying the foundations for a new democratic South Africa. (Jointly awarded to two world leaders Nelson Mandela and Frederik Willem de Klerk)
	Yitzhak Rabin (1922–1995)	1994	Israel	5th Prime Minister of Israel (3 June 1974 – 20 June 1977) (13 July 1992 – 4 November 1995)	For their efforts to create peace in the Middle East. (Jointly awarded to three world leaders Yasser Arafat, Yitzhak Rabin and Shimon Peres)
	Yasser Arafat (1929–2004)	1994	Palestine	1st President of the Palestinian National Authority (2 April 1989 – 11 November 2004) 1st President of the State of Palestine (5 July 1994 – 11 November 2004)	For their efforts to create peace in the Middle East. (Jointly awarded to three world leaders Yasser Arafat, Yitzhak Rabin and Shimon Peres)
	Shimon Peres (1923–2016)	1994	Israel	Acting Prime Minister of Israel (22 April 1977 – 21 June 1977) 8th Prime Minister of Israel (13 September 1984 – 20 October 1986) (4 November 1995 – 18 June 1996) 9th President of Israel (15 July 2007 – 24 July 2014)	For their efforts to create peace in the Middle East. (Jointly awarded to three world leaders Yasser Arafat, Yitzhak Rabin and Shimon Peres)
	José Ramos Horta (born 1949) _{Currently in office}	1996	Timor-Leste	3rd Prime Minister of Timor-Leste (26 June 2006 – 19 May 2007) 4th President of Timor-Leste (20 May 2007 – 11 February 2008) (17 April 2008 – 20 May 2012) 7th President of Timor-Leste (20 May 2022 – Incumbent)	For their work towards a just and peaceful solution to the conflict in Timor-Leste. (Jointly awarded with another non–leading figure East Timorese priest Carlos Filipe Ximenes Belo)
	Kim Dae–jung (1924–2009)	2000	South Korea	8th President of the Republic of Korea (25 February 1998 – 24 February 2003)	For his work for democracy and human rights in South Korea and in East Asia in general, and for peace and reconciliation with North Korea in particular.
	Jimmy Carter (1924–2024)	2002	United States	39th President of the United States (20 January 1977 – 20 January 1981)	For his decades of untiring effort to find peaceful solutions to international conflicts, to advance democracy and human rights, and to promote economic and social development.
Dr. Mohammad Yunus	Muhammad Yunus (born 1940) (interim leader)	2006	Bangladesh	5th Chief Adviser of the Interim Government of Bangladesh (Note: Chief Adviser is an official post in Bangladesh for the head of government during the absence of a Prime Minister of Bangladesh and Parliament, typically used for interim or caretaker governments.) (8 August 2024 – 17 February 2026)	For their efforts to create economic and social development from below. (Note: Awarded not for geo-political/ geo-conflict/ diplomatic efforts) (Note: Not elected by public election or referendum) (Jointly awarded with another corporation Bangladeshi Grameen Bank)
	Martti Ahtisaari (1937–2023)	2008	Finland	10th President of Finland (1 March 1994 – 1 March 2000)	For his important efforts, on several continents and over more than three decades, to resolve international conflicts.
	Barack Obama (born 1961)	2009	United States	44th President of the United States (20 January 2009 – 20 January 2017)	For his extraordinary efforts to strengthen international diplomacy and cooperation between peoples.
	Ellen Johnson Sirleaf (born 1938)	2011	Liberia	24th President of Liberia (16 January 2006 – 22 January 2018)	For their non–violent struggle for the safety of women and for women's rights to full participation in peace–building work. (Jointly awarded with an two other activists Liberian Leymah Gbowee and Yemeni Tawakkul Karman)
	Juan Manuel Santos (born 1951)	2016	Colombia	32th President of Colombia (7 August 2010 – 7 August 2018)	For his resolute efforts to bring the country's more than 50–year–long civil war to an end.
	Abiy Ahmed (born 1976) _{Currently in office}	2019	Ethiopia	Prime Minister of Ethiopia (2 April 2018 – Incumbent)	For his efforts to achieve peace and international cooperation, and in particular for his decisive initiative to resolve the border conflict with neighbouring Eritrea.

== Nobel Laurates for Literature ==
Portrait	Nobel Laureate	Year	Country	Status	Rationale
	Winston Churchill (1874–1965)	1953	United Kingdom	Prime Minister of the United Kingdom (10 May 1940 – 26 July 1945) (26 October 1951 – 5 April 1955)	For his mastery of historical and biographical description as well as for brilliant oratory in defending exalted human values.

== Government In Exile ==
Portrait	Nobel Laureate	Prize	Year	Country	Status	Rationale
	Tenzin Gyatso, 14th Dalai Lama (born 1935)	Peace	1989	Tibet	Claimed Head of State of Tibet (10 March 1963 – 13 June 1991) Head of the Tibetan Administration for Tibetans–in–exile (14 June 1991 – 2011)	For advocating peaceful solutions based upon tolerance and mutual respect in order to preserve the historical and cultural heritage of his people.

== Head of Government of constituent countries ==
A constituent country is a type of country which serves as an administrative division. Constituent countries usually form together to make a larger sovereign country. Unlike federal countries, power between constituent countries may not be spread out evenly, with one of them usually holding the capital and government.

The United Kingdom is a sovereign country made of four constituent countries. They are England, Scotland, Wales, and Northern Ireland. While all four are often referred to as countries, they are technically constituent countries within a sovereign country, the UK. They are also sometimes referred to as regions, provinces, nations, or statelets. However, these titles are problematic and in particular, sensitive in Northern Ireland.

Portrait	Nobel Laureate	Prize	Year	Country	Status	Rationale
	David Trimble (1944–2022)	Peace	1998	Northern Ireland (United Kingdom)	1st First Minister of Northern Ireland (Head of Government of Northern Ireland serving with Seamus Mallon and Mark Durkan) (1 July 1998 – 14 October 2002)	For his efforts to find a peaceful solution to the conflict in Northern Ireland. _{(Jointly awarded to another leading figure Irish politician, John Hume)}

== Awardees by category ==
Historical sovereign state
Government in exile or Constituent country

Country	Laurates
United States	4
Israel	3
France	2
South Africa	2
Germany	2
Soviet Union	1
Belgium	1
Sweden	1
United Kingdom	1
Canada	1
Japan	1
Egypt	1
Poland	1
Costa Rica	1
Myanmar	1
Palestine	1
Timor-Leste	1
South Korea	1
Bangladesh	1
Finland	1
Liberia	1
Colombia	1
Ethiopia	1
Total	31
Tibet	1
Northern Ireland (United Kingdom)	1
Total	33

This lists does not include Tenzin Gyatso, 14th Dalai Lama and David Trimble

Gender	Laureates
Man	29
Female	2
Total	31

Office Holder	Laureates
While in office	17
Awarded before serving in office	6
Awarded after serving in office	6
In Between Two Non–Consecutive Terms	1
Total	31
Currently in office	2

Prize	Laureates
Nobel Peace Prize	30
Nobel Prize in Literature	1
Total	31

== See also ==
- Nobel Prize
- List of Nobel laureates
