= Project Forgive =

American nonprofit that promotes forgiveness for emotional healing

- Project Forgive Foundation
- Formation: April 2012; 14 years ago
- Founder: Shawne Duperon
- Type: Nonprofit foundation
- Legal status: 501(c)(3) organization
- Purpose: Promote forgiveness and emotional healing
- Location: United States
- Leader: Shawne Duperon
- Website: projectforgive.com

Project Forgive (also known as the Project Forgive Foundation) is an American non-profit, non-partisan, non-religious leadership foundation which educates university students in the topics of business that include diversity, integrity, collaboration, compassion and forgiveness in the workplace.

In 2016, the project acquired further popularity for its documentary film of the same name based on true stories of forgiveness. The film has been produced by the project's founder, six time Emmy Awards winner, media expert, public speaker and film producer, Shawne Duperon. It is slated for release on PBS in 2016.

== History ==
The project uses a collection of real life stories and serves as an inquiry to inspire a forgiveness movement around the globe. This campaign was crowdsourced as a Kickstarter project in April 2012. The project focuses on "extraordinary acts of forgiveness in the face of heartbreak and senseless tragedy" and serves as an inquiry into the meaning of forgiveness.

Project Forgive was founded as a case study project, by Shawne Duperon, an expert in the phenomenon of gossip as a research subject for 10 years, to reach out to millions via social media for the cause.

Project Forgive drove its inspiration from a real life incident in which a Detroit-area mom and her two young sons were killed by a drunk driver who was eventually forgiven by the dead woman's husband. Duperon discovered that the driver and the victims were all her friends.

In addition to pledges from international leaders like Archbishop Desmond Tutu, Project Forgive has been featured in major media channels such as CNN, ABC, NBC, CBC and Inc. Magazine.

The producer and founder of the project, Shawne Duperon, is a six time Emmy Awards Winner, a communications scholar, a member of the National Speakers Association and has also been awarded "Innovator of the Year" for 2005, and has been among top-10 women business owners in Michigan by The National Association of Women Business Owners in 2008. In 2016, Duperon was nominated for the Nobel Peace Prize.
