= Nansen dialogue =

Nansen Dialogue was a project initially created at the Nansen Academy in Lillehammer in 1995 as a counter-reaction to the city hosting the 1994 Winter Olympics. During the same time, the Bosnian War, which involved the former Winter Olympics City of Sarajevo continued. The former headmaster of the Nansen Academy, Inge Eidsvåg, visited the rehabilitation ward for war injuries at the Kosovo Hospital in Sarajevo in 1994. It was this visit that triggered the idea of the Nansen Dialogue Project.

"I visited the rehabilitation ward for war injuries of the Kosovo Hospital in Sarajevo in 1994. This was before the Dayton Agreement and at the time Sarajevo was under siege. The five days I spent there made a big impression on me, and as soon as I was back in Norway I got in touch with the Norwegian Red Cross and the Norwegian Church Aid to suggest a joint project called "Democracy, Human Rights and Peaceful Conflict Handling", to which they agreed. A few weeks later we worked out a temporary program and applied for financial support from the Ministry of Foreign Affairs. They decided to offer their support and later on the Peace Research Institute (PRIO) was invited to join in. In September 1995 we were able to welcome the first group of students from the former Yugoslavia. Within a year we had turned an idea into reality."

At first, the project consisted of dialogue seminars in Lillehammer, but the participants felt that even if the dialogue seminars could be helpful, the fact that only "a privileged few" could participate made it less successful than expected, propiciating a change in structure. A Serbian and an Albanian woman who'd participated in the seminars decided to set up a Nansen Dialogue Center in Pristina in 1997. They created dialogue seminars and invited both Albanians and Serbs from Kosovo to participate. The project was kept active until the spring of 1999, when NATO bombings over Yugoslavia and Kosovo put a temporary end to them. The Center re-opened in 2000, and that year additional centers were opened in Podgorica, Skopje and [[Belgrade|Belgrade ]]. During the fall new Centers opened in Bosnia – Herzegovina, Sarajevo, Mostar and Banja Luka, and in 2001 in Osijek and Mestrovic. In 2005 the Bujanovac Center opened.

Today, there are 10 Dialogue Centers employing more than 60 people. They work with dialogue between ethnic groups who have previously been at war. More than 150 separate dialogue seminars between former enemies from conflicted areas have been held at the Nansen Academy premises, and it is still possible to attend workshops in Lillehammer. In addition to working with the former Yugoslavia the Nansen Center for Peace and Dialogue has expanded their efforts to include participants from other conflicted areas, such as the Middle East, and the Horn of Africa. Steinar Bryn is in charge of the project.

Nansen Dialogue was merged with the Norwegian Peace Centre in 2010 into a new entity called the Nansen Center for Peace and Dialogue. The Norwegian Peace Centre was founded in 1988, and the main focus of the establishment was to create a venue for peace work, such as workshops, seminars and courses in peace work and human rights.
