= International Surf Lifesaving Association =

The International Surf Lifesaving Association (ISLA) is a nonprofit organization that advances professional lifesaving development to areas in need around the globe. ISLA uses latest technology to identify areas in need. ISLA advances development through lifeguard training programs and aquatic rescue operation consults, lifeguard exchanges, equipment donations, and by integrating with drowning prevention organizations to share information, techniques, stories, and culture.

== Mission statement ==
The International Surf Lifesaving Association (ISLA) exists to advance professional lifesaving development to areas in need around the globe.

== History ==
Four Huntington Beach Junior Lifeguard Instructors; Peter Eich, Scott Hunthausen, Olin Patterson, and Henry Reyes started ISLA in 2008. ISLA was formed after Scott returned home from a study abroad semester in Nicaragua where he experienced the drowning of his host family's son friend, and witnessed the alarming drowning rates where over 60 people drowned during the 4-day Semana Santa holiday (Easter).

== Organization structure ==
ISLA has a two two-tier system of leadership, there are two separate boards, an Executive Board for day-to-day business and a Board of Directors for supervising the President. The ISLA President is hired by the Board of Directors and presides over the Executive Board and the ISLA Chairman is elected by the Board of Directors and presides over the Board of Directors, currently the roles of President and Chairman is held by one individual. The Executive Board is currently made up of the ISLA President, VP of Sales, VP of Operations, and the VP of Marketing. The ISLA Vice Presidents oversee International Ambassadors, management staff (also known as Marine Safety Officers MSO's), and volunteers.

== Humanitarian projects ==
- 2008: Transcontinental Bike Ride
- 2009: Nicaragua
- 2010: Nicaragua, New Zealand
- 2011: Ecuador, Nicaragua, Dominican Republic
- 2012: Nicaragua, Dominican Republic(Spring), Mexico(Summer), Dominican Republic(Fall), Mexico(Fall), New Zealand, Peru, Chile
- 2013: Dominican Republic, Nicaragua, Greece, Macedonia, United States, Mexico(Fall), England, Germany

== Global Drowning Tracker© ==
=== GDT Version 1.0 ===
In 2013 at the National Drowning Prevention Symposium in Fort Lauderdale, Florida ISLA launched the world's first Global Drowning Tracker© (www.drowningtracker.com). Although the software is just a working prototype, The Global Drowning Tracker© allows people around the world to input statistics on drownings, and promotes awareness by utilizing social media. The end result is a tool that enables researchers, lifesavers and drowning prevention experts a real-time snapshot of where resources need to be allocated to prevent drownings. Global Drowning Tracker© V.1.0 was presented to a Congressional Committee in Washington D.C. as part of International Water Safety Day on May 15, 2013.

=== GDT Version 2.0 ===
Currently the International Surf Lifesaving Association is seeking sponsors in the international drowning prevention community to co-develop the next version of the Global Drowning Tracker© software. GDT Version 2.0 proposed features include:

- Bulk data import/export
- Report multiple victims in one incident
- Enhanced administrative interface and controls
- Dynamic IP language translation for top 20 languages
- Real-time interactive map
- Improved SMS Text Messaging incident reporting
- ICD code and Utstein integration for scientific reporting
- Dynamically adjusting screen resolution for a full range of devices

== Certification ==
=== Overview ===
The ISLA Lifeguard Certification Program was developed to raise international lifeguarding standards and training programs to a minimum professional standard. There are two types of ISLA Open Water Lifeguard Certifications; Basic, and Advanced.

=== Basic Open Water Lifeguard ===
Course Length: 3 days / 30 hours.

==== Course description ====
The ISLA Basic Open Water Lifeguard Course is designed for people with little or no background in open water lifeguarding. It provides an introductory exposure to both the theoretical and practical components of open water lifeguard subjects such as lifeguard operations, aquatic injury prevention, and basic open water rescue. This course does not include a certification in CPR or First Aid.

==== Course objectives ====
At the end of this course, the trainee should have the ability to:

- Prevent an accident based on knowledge of physical and social conditions.
- Recognize dangerous aquatic conditions and hazardous areas.
- Identify a victim in distress.
- Discern appropriate responses to a variety of different situations taking into account personal ability and scene safety.
- Effectively execute a basic rescue in open water.

==== Course prerequisites ====
Any student wishing to participate in the ISLA Basic Open Water Lifeguard course must meet the following requirements:

- 16 Years of age or older (with minors consent form for those under 18)
- Ability to swim 500 meters (550 yards) without stopping
- Ability to tread water for five minutes
- Ability to dive to a depth of three meters (Ten Feet)

==== Advanced Open Water Lifeguard ====
Course Length: 10 days/ 100 hours

The advanced course explores all the subjects in the Basic Open Water Lifeguard Course more in depth, along with the inclusion of a First Aid and CPR certification.
