= Rondine (Arezzo) =

Rondine is a small village in the Province of Arezzo, in Tuscany, Italy. It is located 12 km from the town of Arezzo. The settlement dates from the 11th century, when the castle (Castello di Rondine) was built. This castle, since fallen into ruin, is currently undergoing restoration. The Associazione Rondine, which brings together students from areas of conflict in order to promote peace and reconciliation, is based in the village.

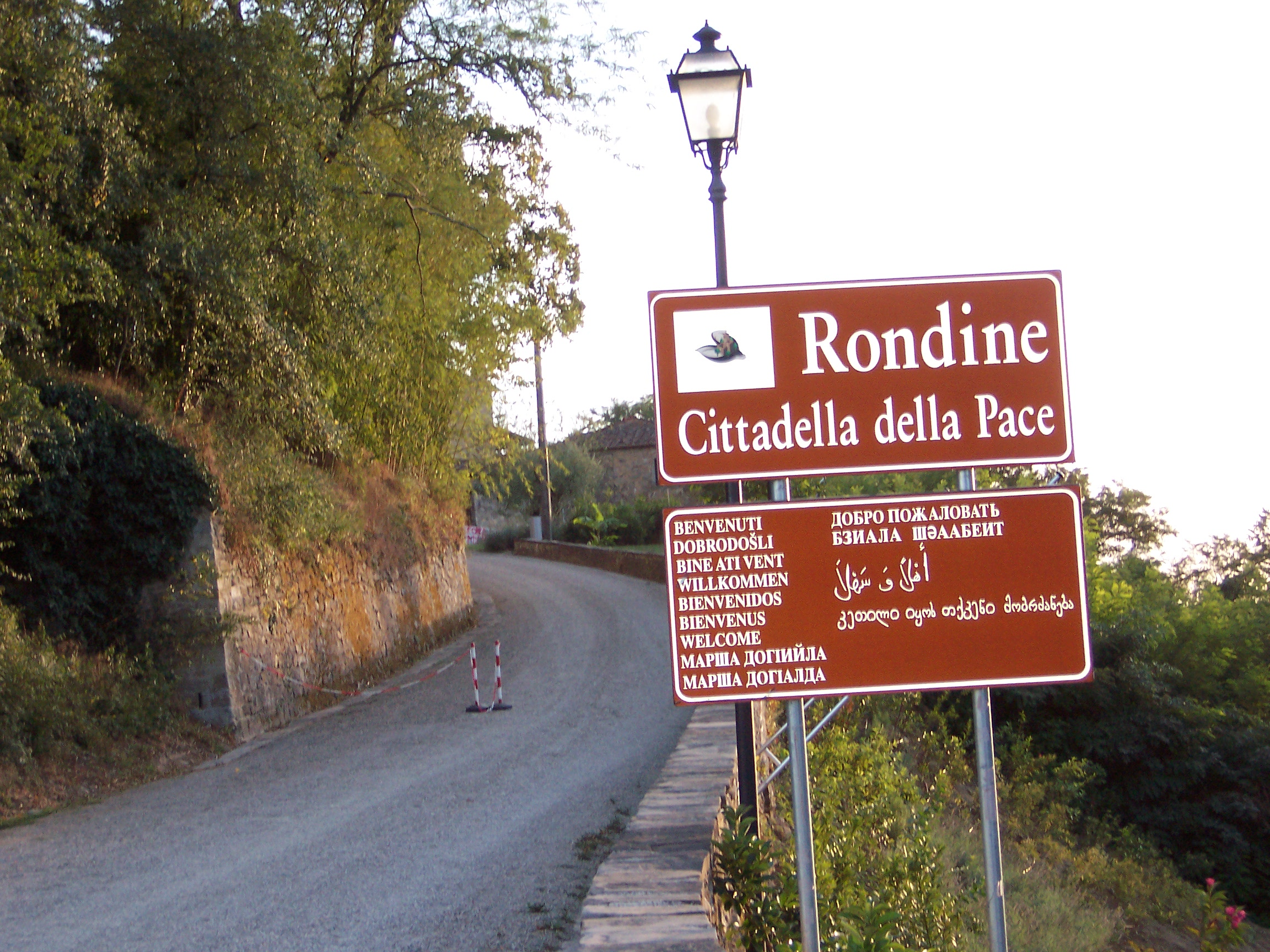
Cittadella della Pace

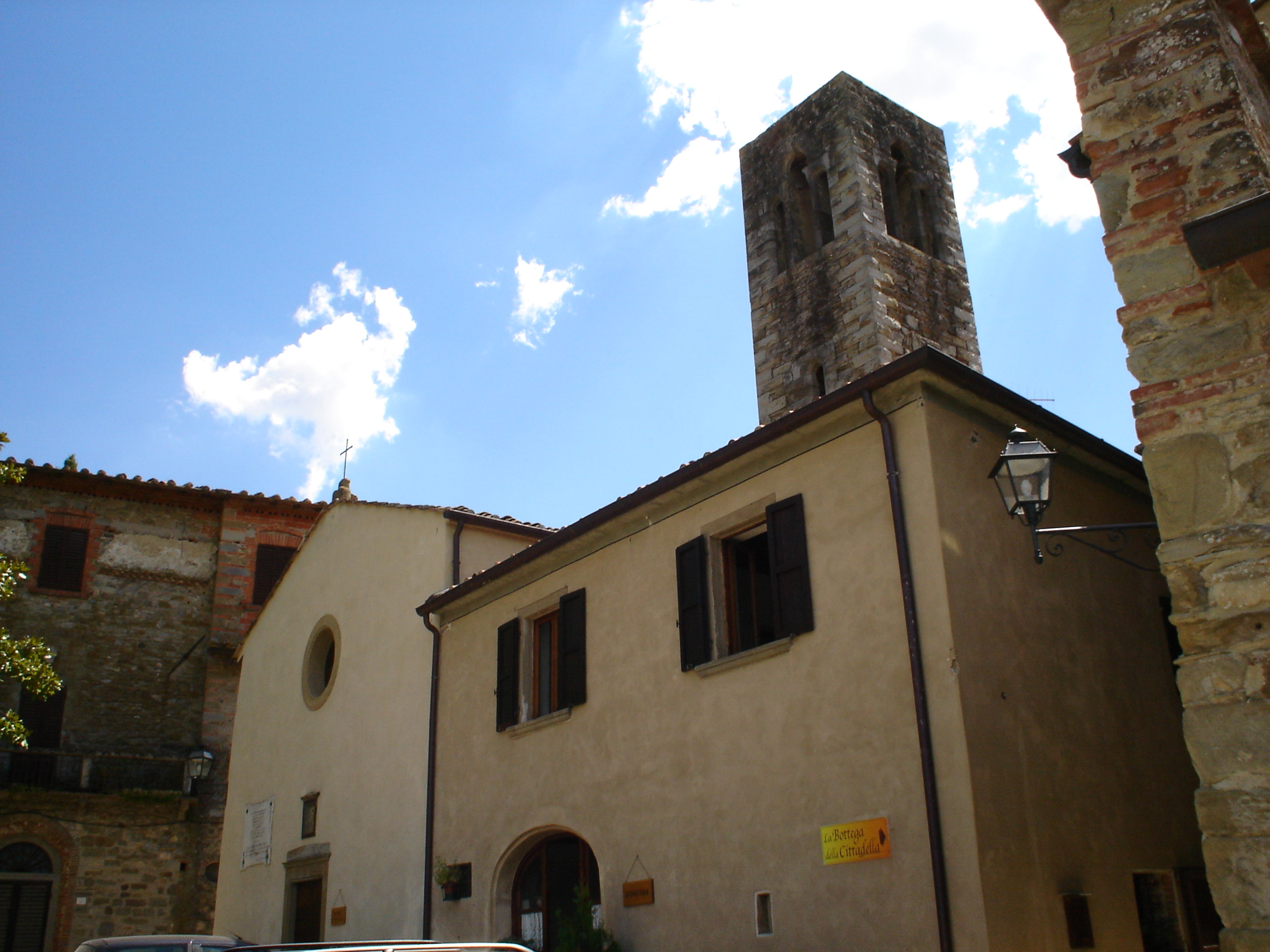
Rondine Church

== History ==
Up to 1977, the medieval village of Rondine was completely abandoned and destined to fall apart. It was then that the Bishop of Arezzo, Telesforo Cioli, appointed two young families to maintain and restructure the small village. Shortly after, two local communities, the Comunità del Sacro Cuore and the Comunità Giovanile di Saione joined the effort to recover Rondine. In the following years, Rondine slowly grew to become a village that would welcome and assist families in need.

In 1990, Rondine hosted the birth of Associazione Rondine, a cultural association that started acting on a broader scale, including solidarity projects for the newly formed Russian Federation. Soon after, in 1995, following the eruption of the First Chechnya War, long negotiations were met with a ceasefire. At this point, Rondine decided to accept five students from Chechnya, and five from Russia, to live together and meet “the person behind the enemy”. This initial encounter between students originating from both sides of a military conflict is what sparked the idea behind the foundation of l’Associazione Cittadella della Pace. The foundation of this Association in 1997, allowed Rondine to expand with its Studentato Internationale di Rondine (Rondine's International Student Residence Hall). This initiative was later amplified to adopt “rivals” from nations in conflict such as: Abkhazia, Ingushetia, Bosnia-Herzegovina, Serbia, Romania, Israel, Palestine, South Ossetia, Sierra Leone, North Macedonia, and Lebanon.

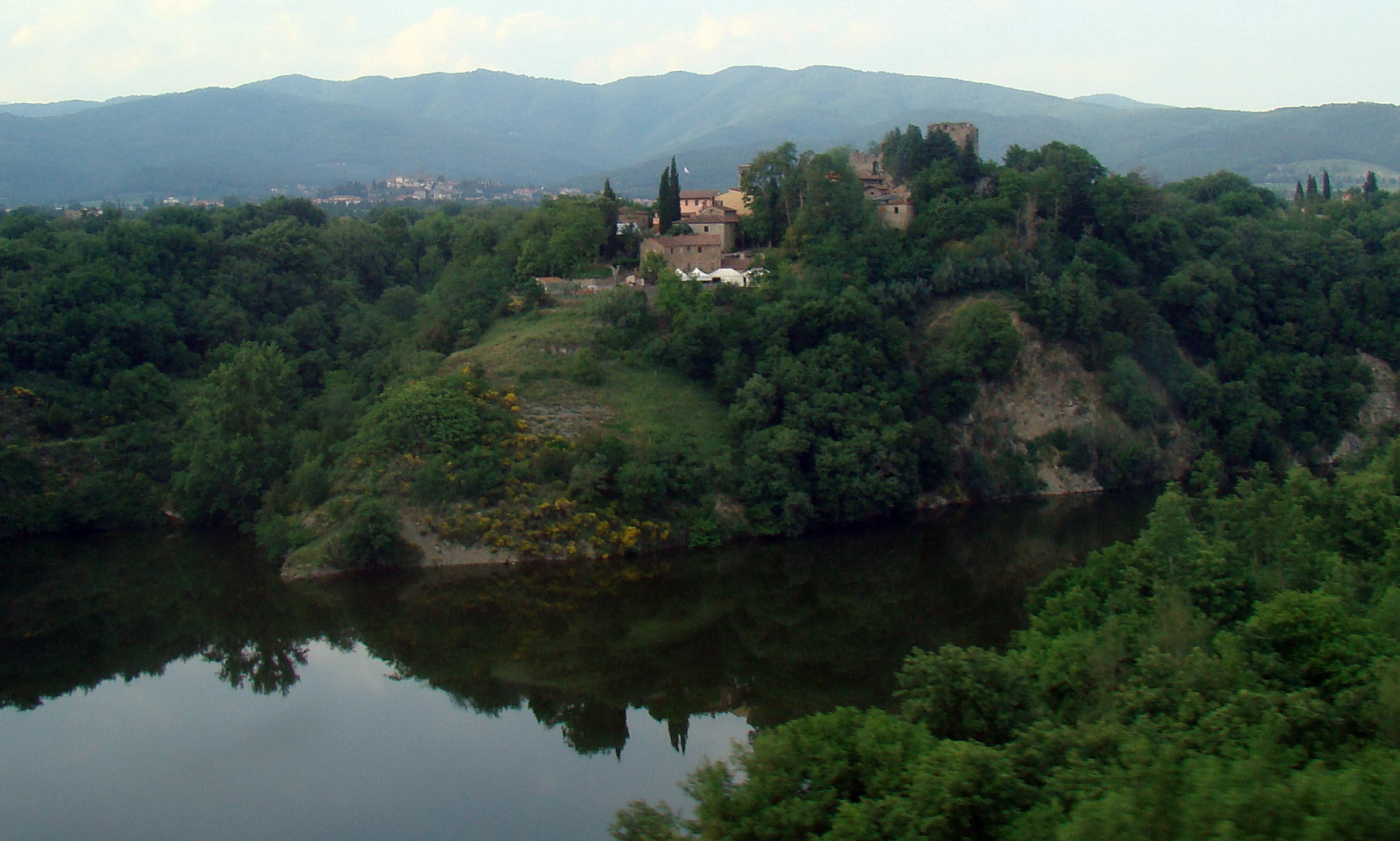
Rondine Village

== Mission ==
“Promoting conflict resolution through the experiences of young people who are able to uncover a real person within their enemy.”

With this mission in mind, the Association uses the International Residence Hall to allow students coming from different conflicting nations to live together and gradually starting to promote dialogue and a peaceful coexistence between their nations. Throughout their time at Rondine, students have the opportunity of completing undergraduate or postgraduate courses in nearby Universities, so that with their return home as potential future leaders, they may use their open mentality to advocate for peace in their respective countries.
