= Lists of individuals nominated for the Nobel Peace Prize =

The following are the lists of individuals nominated for the Nobel Peace Prize in different periods:
