= 1968 Nobel Peace Prize =

Award

- René Cassin
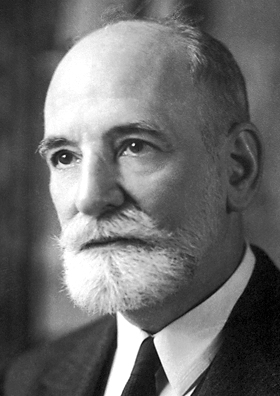
- "for his struggle to ensure the rights of man as stipulated in the UN Declaration."
- Date: 9 October 1968 (announcement); 10 December 1968 (ceremony)
- Location: Oslo, Norway
- Presented by: Norwegian Nobel Committee
- First award: 1901
- Website: Official website

The 1968 Nobel Peace Prize was awarded to the French jurist René Cassin (1887–1976) "for his struggle to ensure the rights of man as stipulated in the UN Declaration." He is the ninth French recipient of the peace prize.

== Laureate ==
After experiencing the horrors of the World War I and ending up becoming a severely wounded soldier, René Cassin discovered the very value and dignity of human life. Inspired, he represented France at the League of Nations during the inter-war years, and worked for disarmament. In the 1920s, Cassin sought to bring reconciliation between former enemies, and declared that military veterans were especially well equipped to bring about reconciliation and peace. Hence, he supported war veteran's efforts in peace conferences. After World War II, he was assigned to the United Nations to help draft the 1948 Universal Declaration of Human Rights together with P. C. Chang, Charles Malik and Eleanor Roosevelt. During the drafting process, he contributed much in its revisions, expansions and improvements until it was accepted by the General Assembly during its third session on 10 December 1948. He later became the president of the European Court of Human Rights in 1965 to 1968, after which, through his lifelong efforts to ensure universal human rights, the Norwegian Nobel Committee recognized him.

== Deliberations ==
=== Nominations ===
René Cassin was nominated only in three occasions: in 1949 by 1937 Nobel laureate Robert Cecil, 1st Viscount Cecil of Chelwood, in 1950 by American lawyer Manley Ottmer Hudson and in 1968 by French law professor Georges Vedel.

In total, the Norwegian Nobel Committee earned 78 nominations for 34 individuals and 14 organizations such Vinoba Bhave, Hermann Gmeiner, Danilo Dolci, U Thant, Cyrus S. Eaton and the Universal Esperanto Association. Seventeen of the nominees were newly nominated such as Norman Borlaug (awarded in 1970), Halvard Lange, John S. Knight, Alfonso García Robles (awarded in 1982), Frans Hemerijckx, Vicenç Ferrer Moncho, Ernst Bloch, René Maheu, John Collins, the World Health Organization (WHO), the World Council of Churches (WCW) and the UNESCO. The British philanthropist Sue Ryder was the only female nominee. Notable figures like Otto Hahn (awarded the 1944 Nobel Prize in Chemistry), Joseph Kentenich, Muriel Lester, Thomas Merton, Georgios Papandreou, Amparo Poch y Gascón, Gabrielle Radziwill and Pitirim Sorokin died in 1968 without having been nominated for the peace prize.

Official list of nominees and their nominators for the prize
No.	Nominee	Country/ Headquarters	Motivations	Nominator(s)
Individuals
1	Vinoba Bhave (1895–1982)	India	"for his work for world peace."	Dominique Pire, O.P. (1910–1969)
2	Ernst Bloch (1885–1977)	Germany	"as a representative of the prophetic-messianic ideas and the peace idea."	Michael Landmann (1913–1984)
3	Norman Borlaug (1914–2009)	United States	"[with The Rockefeller Foundation] for their work in the development of the very high yielding Mexican dwarf wheats which are markedly increasing the world's food supply."	Roscoe L. Barrel (?)
4	Frederick Burdick (?)(prob. Eugene Burdick (1918–1965))	United States	"for contributing to the cause of word peace by publishing Gist Research polls."	Arnold Olsen (1916–1990)
4	Frederick Burdick (?)(prob. Eugene Burdick (1918–1965))	United States	"for the consistency of his efforts and his untiring determination to spread hope by continuing his work for peace throughout the U.S. Congress."	Jim Wright (1922–2015)
4	Frederick Burdick (?)(prob. Eugene Burdick (1918–1965))	United States	"for demonstrating a continued zeal for promoting the cause of peace through his daily activities."	Watkins Abbitt (1908–1998)
5	René Cassin (1887–1976)	France	"for his work to promote peace and human rights."	Georges Vedel (1910–2002)
6	Sanjib Chaudhuri (?)	India	"for the large quantity of work he has done towards the causes of world order, world peace and one supranational government for the world."	Primatha Chaudhuri (?)
7	John Collins (1905–1982)	United Kingdom	No motivation included.	13 members of the Swedish Parliament
8	Danilo Dolci (1924–1997)	Italy	No motivation included.	John Kay (b. 1942)
8	Danilo Dolci (1924–1997)	Italy	No motivation included.	127 members of the Swedish Parliament
9	Cyrus S. Eaton (1883–1979)	Canada; United States	"for his immense contributions to international understanding and friendship, wherein his enthusiasm and the wisdom of his pronouncements has caused him to be and understanding world figure for peace and cooperation instead of coannihilation."	Stephen M. Young (1889–1984)
9	Cyrus S. Eaton (1883–1979)	Canada; United States	"in recognition of his efforts for peace, wherein he has been a consistent and constructive advocate of friendship between East and West and his observations on China merit particular attention."	Jennings Randolph (1902–1998)
10	Vicenç Ferrer Moncho (1920–2009)	Spain; India	"for having revitalized an ever-widening area of famine-threatened India with a movement based on the most fundamental of human values, a most significant contribution to the achievement of peace in our age."	Francis X. Murphy (1914–2002)
11	Alfonso García Robles (1911–1991)	Mexico	"for his work in negotiating the Treaty for the Prohibition of Nuclear Weapons in Latin America, and for his other services to international goodwill and understanding."	Philip Noel-Baker (1889–1982)
12	Hermann Gmeiner (1919–1986)	Austria	"for his great humanitarian work and his contribution to healing the wounds of war through the establishment of SOS Children's Villages."	Felix Ermacora (1923–1995)
12	Hermann Gmeiner (1919–1986)	Austria	"as founder SOS Children's Villages, wherein his idea, and his execution of it, has contributed greatly to world peace."	Alfred Verdroß-Droßberg (1890–1980)
12	Hermann Gmeiner (1919–1986)	Austria	"as founder of SOS Children's Villages, wherein his work goes far beyond any social duties and is an effectual contribution to world peace."	Alfons Gorbach (1898–1972)
12	Hermann Gmeiner (1919–1986)	Austria	"for his worldwide efforts contribute uniquely to peace and understanding between peoples."	Franz Mayer (1882–1975)
12	Hermann Gmeiner (1919–1986)	Austria	"for his great service to the cause of peace through his establishment of SOS Children's Villages."	Erwin Altenburger (1903–1984)
12	Hermann Gmeiner (1919–1986)	Austria	"as founder and president of SOS Children's Villages."	Hermann Withalm (1912–2003)
12	Hermann Gmeiner (1919–1986)	Austria	No motivation included.	Kurt Neuner (1925–2015)
13	Guido Guida (1897–1969)	Italy	No motivation included.	Guiseppe Strataro (?); Guido Gonella (1905–1982)
14	Frans Hemerijckx (1902–1969)	Belgium	"for his work for people suffering from leprosy in Africa and Asia."	Thaddée Bagaragaza (?)
14	Frans Hemerijckx (1902–1969)	Belgium	"for devoting his life to help people suffering from leprosy in Africa and Asia."	Chanoine Jacques Étienne (1925–2019)
14	Frans Hemerijckx (1902–1969)	Belgium	"for devoting his life to help people suffering from leprosy in Africa and Asia."	Paul Vanden Boeynants (1919–2001)
14	Frans Hemerijckx (1902–1969)	Belgium	"for devoting his life to help people suffering from leprosy in Africa and Asia."	Roger Aubert (1914–2009)
15	William P. Holman (1914–2003)	United States	No motivation included.	Odin Langen (1913–1976)
16	John S. Knight (1894–1981)	United States	"for having courageously waged an editorial campaign for the causes of international and domestic peace for decades, wherein by personal example and as a publisher and editor of several distinguished newspapers, he has been a leader in the fight for tolerance."	Frederick D. Lewis (?)
17	Yoshio Koya (1890–1974)	Japan	"for his many outstanding services to humanity where largely through his pioneering efforts as a world-renowned gynecologists that the birth rate and rate of induced abortions in Japan have declined."	Martin Allwood (1916–1999)
18	Halvard Lange (1902–1970)	Norway	"for his valiant effort on behalf of effectively organizing and maintaining the peaceful coexistence of all nations."	Carl Joachim Friedrich (1901–1984)
18	Halvard Lange (1902–1970)	Norway	"for his outstandingly constructive and practical contributions to peace, wherein he has worked effectively to further a common peace-oriented policy among the five states in Scandinavia, and as foreign minister of a staunch NATO ally, he has taken a leading part in bringing the alliance to explore positive political perspectives."	Edmund A. Gullion (1913–1998)
18	Halvard Lange (1902–1970)	Norway	"for, with great conviction, having applied himself to the furthering of brotherhood, common understanding and peaceful co-operation between peoples."	Käte Strobel (1907–1996)
18	Halvard Lange (1902–1970)	Norway	"for his lifelong service to the cause of peace and understanding between peoples."	Carlo Schmid (1896–1979)
18	Halvard Lange (1902–1970)	Norway	"for his efforts to the cause of world peace and understanding between peoples despite his difficult personal fate in the Second World War."	Lauritz Lauritzen (1910–1980)
18	Halvard Lange (1902–1970)	Norway	"for, despite his personal experience in the Second World War, being an advocate for reconciliation and understanding between peoples."	Herbert Wehner (1906–1990)
18	Halvard Lange (1902–1970)	Norway	"for, despite his personal experience in the Second World War, being an advocate for reconciliation and understanding between peoples."	Gerhard Jahn (1927–1998)
18	Halvard Lange (1902–1970)	Norway	"for, despite his personal experience in the Second World War, being an advocate for reconciliation and understanding between peoples."	81 members of the German Parliament
18	Halvard Lange (1902–1970)	Norway	"for his efforts to normalize the circumstances in Europe after the Second World War and further reconciliation and understanding, wherein he has given his whole life to the service of peace and understanding between peoples."	Karl Schiller (1911–1994)
19	Trygve Lie (1896–1968)	Norway	"for the work he has done as Secretary General of the United Nations, and the work he has done since, towards the cause of peace."	Helge Refsum (1897–1976)
20	René Maheu (1905–1975)	France	"as Director General of UNESCO, where the organization and its achievements have borne the impress of his leadership, which has been marked by extraordinary vision, strength and wisdom."	Constantin Zureiq (1909–2000)
20	René Maheu (1905–1975)	France	"[with UNESCO] for their work for peace by promoting international understanding and rapprochement among the peoples, and social and cultural development."	Fouad Ammoun (1899–1977)
20	René Maheu (1905–1975)	France	"[with UNESCO] for their work for peace by education and the promotion of human culture in the world."	Léopold Sédar Senghor (1906–2001)
21	Kathiresu Ramachandra (1895–1976)	Sri Lanka	"for furthering inter-communal, inter-racial and inter-religious harmony and international understanding and peace."	G. G. Ponnambalam (1901–1977)
22	Adam Rapacki (1909–1970)	Poland	"for having done pioneering work in expanding and strengthening Poland's foreign relations, thus paving the way to relaxation of tension and to the consolidation of friendly relations and cooperation between East and West."	Maurycy Jaroszyński (1890–1974); 16 Polish scholars
23	Sue Ryder (1924–2000)	United Kingdom	"for her personal dedication and inspiring example and leadership to encourage the forces of mercy and compassion against those of brutality and aggression, leading to war."	Rab Butler (1902–1982)
24	Joaquín Sanz Gadea (1930–2019)	Spain	"for his work for peace through humanitarian development in Congo."	Luis Sánchez Granjel (1920–2014)
25	Binay Ranjan Sen (1898–1993)	India	"for his exceptional contribution to the peace of the world through his work at the Food and Agriculture Organization (FAO)."	Maurice Sauvé (1923–1992)
26	Clarence Streit (1896–1986)	United States	No motivation included.	Frank Carlson (1893–1987)
27	U Thant (1909–1974)	Burma	"for his tireless devotion to the cause of world peace, wherein he makes the impression of a man dedicated to the peaceful resolution of international conflicts."	William Edward Barton (1868–1955)
27	U Thant (1909–1974)	Burma	"for his work as Secretary General of the United Nations, wherein he is a most important international civil servant and is deeply and spiritually dedicated to the bringing of real peace to mankind."	Colin Bell (1903–1988)
28	Jan Tinbergen (1903–1994)	Netherlands	"for contributing to a more rational economic policy and coordinated planning in western countries, and devoting himself to the improvement of standards of living in poor countries."	professors at the Leiden University
29	Abraham Vereide (1886–1969)	United States	No motivation included.	Frank Carlson (1893–1987)
30	Richard von Coudenhove-Kalergi (1894–1972)	Austria; Japan	"for his work to promote the idea of a united Europe."	Didier Julia (b. 1934)
30	Richard von Coudenhove-Kalergi (1894–1972)	Austria; Japan	"for his efforts to create a European union as a basis for world peace."	3 members of the Italian Senate
30	Richard von Coudenhove-Kalergi (1894–1972)	Austria; Japan	No motivation included.	Mitsujirō Ishii (1889–1981)
31	Fritz von Unruh (1885–1970)	Germany	"for his remarkable work for peace, wherein through his literary work and his speeches, he has served the cause of peace and understanding amongst peoples."	Franz Mayer (1882–1975)
32	Eric Wyndham White (1913–1980)	United Kingdom	"for his ability to protect the principle of international economy, establish the foundation for future development of the world trade, and preserve the world peace in this way."	Kiichi Miyazawa (1919–2007)
33	Ralph K. White (1907–1993)	United States	"for his many scientific contributions to brotherhood among nations by advancing the scientific study of psychological causes of international misunderstanding and war."	Richard A. Falk (b. 1930)
34	Y. C. James Yen (1890–1990)	China	"for having devoted his life to finding effective solutions to common problems that plague the rural population in developing countries, and enabling them to realize their great human potential, and for the ultimate benefit of themselves and of all mankind – contributing in a most effective manner to strengthening the foundations of world peace."	Adolfo Molina Orantes (1915–1980)
Organizations
35	Amnesty International (founded in 1961)	London	No motivation included.	Johan Vogt (1900–1991)
36	Institute of International Law (IDI) (founded in 1873)	Ghent	"for introducing a much needed element of detachment and objectivity to the important task of creating and elaborating on international law to meet the needs of a world community in revolution."	Ted McWhinney (1924–2015)
37	International Law Association (ILA) (founded in 1873)	Brussels	"for its work in the clarification and development of international law, wherein by means of research, examination and conferences, it has made notable contributions to the cause of international peace and cooperation."	Arnold McNair (1885–1975)
37	International Law Association (ILA) (founded in 1873)	Brussels	"for working unceasingly for the cause of law and peace among nations."	Richard Wilberforce (1907–2003)
37	International Law Association (ILA) (founded in 1873)	Brussels	No motivation included.	Jean P. A. François (1889–1978)
38	International Union for Child Welfare (IUCW) (founded in 1946)	Geneva	"for its worldwide and comprehensive work for the benefit of children in all countries, and its endeavours in the name of humankind and peace."	Gunnar Garbo (1924–2016)
39	International Union for Land Value Taxation and Free Trade (The IU) (founded in 1926)	London	No motivation included.	Francis Douglas (1889–1980)
40	Islands of Peace (founded in 1958)	Huy	"for its work to help people to create development for themselves."	Raymond Vander Elst (1914–2008)
41	Pugwash Conferences on Science and World Affairs (founded in 1957)	Pugwash, Nova Scotia	No motivation included.	Anders Bratholm (1920–2010)
42	SOS Children's Villages (founded in 1949)	Innsbruck	"for its work, that goes far beyond any social duties, and their effectual contribution to world peace."	Leopold Helbich (1926–2004)
42	SOS Children's Villages (founded in 1949)	Innsbruck	"for its work that transcends the social tasks and achieves an effective contribution to world peace."	Hermann Baltl (1918–2004)
43	The Rockefeller Foundation (founded in 1913)	New York City	"[with Borlaug] for their work in the development of the very high yielding Mexican dwarf wheats which are markedly increasing the world's food supply."	Roscoe L. Barrel (?)
44	United Nations Educational, Scientific and Cultural Organization (UNESCO) (founded in 1945)	Paris	"[with Maheu] for its work for peace by promoting international understanding and rapprochement among the peoples, and social and cultural development."	Fouad Ammoun (1899–1977)
44	United Nations Educational, Scientific and Cultural Organization (UNESCO) (founded in 1945)	Paris	"[with Maheu] for their work for peace by education and the promotion of human culture in the world."	Léopold Sédar Senghor (1906–2001)
45	Universal Esperanto Association (UEA) (founded in 1908)	Rotterdam	"for its work for cordial relations between peoples and the promotion of universal peace."	Paul Röhner (1927–2014)
45	Universal Esperanto Association (UEA) (founded in 1908)	Rotterdam	"for the activities it implements that are in the spirit of Nobel."	5 members of the Norwegian Parliament
45	Universal Esperanto Association (UEA) (founded in 1908)	Rotterdam	"for its efforts to spread Esperanto as an international linguistic means of communication, thus contributing to peaceful cooperation and the lessening of misunderstandings and mistrust."	Tyyne Leivo-Larsson (1902–1977)
45	Universal Esperanto Association (UEA) (founded in 1908)	Rotterdam	No motivation included.	Einar Dahl (1904–1979)
46	Women's International League for Peace and Freedom (WILPF) (founded in 1915)	Geneva	No motivation included.	Marie Lous Mohr (1892–1973)
47	World Council of Churches (WCC) (founded in 1948)	Geneva	"for, without regard to religious, cultural, ethnical or political differences, seeking to contribute to constructive solutions to international conflicts and engage the churches with responsible political authorities to create international community."	17 members of the Swedish Parliament
48	World Health Organization (WHO) (founded in 1948)	Geneva	"for its outstanding contribution to peacebuilding, as well as its relief of human suffering."	Ritchie Calder (1906–1982)
48	World Health Organization (WHO) (founded in 1948)	Geneva	"for its work to raise the level of health among the developing areas."	Marius Moutet (1876–1968)

== Norwegian Nobel Committee ==
The following members of the Norwegian Nobel Committee appointed by the Storting were responsible for the selection of the 1968 Nobel laureate in accordance with the will of Alfred Nobel:

1969 Norwegian Nobel Committee
Picture	Name	Position	Political Party	Other posts
	Aase Lionæs (1907–1999)	Chairwoman	Labour	Vice President of the Lagting (1965–1973)
	Bernt Ingvaldsen (1902–1982)	Member	Conservative	President of the Storting (1965–1972)
	Helge Refsum (1897–1976)	Member	Centre	former Judge at the Gulating Court (1922–1949)
	Helge Rognlien (1920–2001)	Member	Liberal	former Leader of the Young Liberals of Norway (1946–1948)
	Erling Wikborg (1894–1992)	Member	Christian People	former Leader of the Christian Democratic Party (1951–1955)
