= List of Nobel Peace Prize laureates =

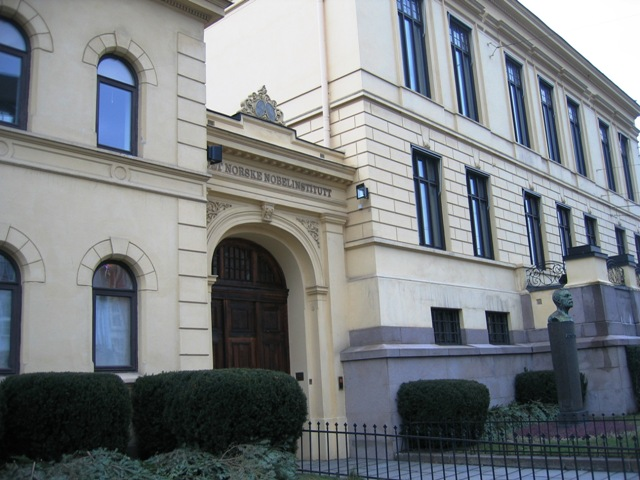
The Norwegian Nobel Institute assists the Norwegian Nobel Committee in selecting recipients of the Nobel Peace Prize and in organising the annual award in Oslo.

The Norwegian Nobel Committee awards the Nobel Peace Prize annually "to the person who shall have done the most or the best work for fraternity between nations, for the abolition or reduction of standing armies and for the holding and promotion of peace congresses." As dictated by Alfred Nobel's will, the award is administered by the Norwegian Nobel Committee and awarded by a committee of five people elected by the Parliament of Norway.

Each recipient receives a medal, a diploma, and a monetary award prize (that has varied throughout the years). It is one of the five prizes established by the 1895 will of Alfred Nobel (who died in 1896), awarded for outstanding contributions in chemistry, physics, literature, physiology or medicine.

== Overview ==
The Peace Prize is presented annually in Oslo, in the presence of the King of Norway, on 10 December, the anniversary of Nobel's death, and is the only Nobel Prize not presented in Stockholm. Unlike the other prizes, the Peace Prize is occasionally awarded to an organisation (such as the International Committee of the Red Cross, a three-time recipient) rather than an individual.

The Nobel Peace Prize was first awarded in 1901 to Frédéric Passy and Henry Dunant, who shared a prize of 150,782 Swedish kronor (equal to about 7.7 million kronor in 2008), and most recently in 2026 to Navi Pillay.

- Linus Pauling, the Nobel Peace Prize laureate in 1962, is the only person to have been awarded two unshared Nobel Prizes; he won the Nobel Prize in Chemistry in 1954.
- At 17 years of age, Malala Yousafzai, the 2014 recipient, is the youngest to be awarded the Peace Prize.
- The first woman to receive a Nobel Peace Prize was Bertha von Suttner in 1905. Of the 113 individual Nobel Peace Prize Laureates, 20 have been women.
- The International Committee of the Red Cross has received the most Nobel Peace Prizes, having been awarded the Prize three times for its humanitarian work.
- Five Nobel Peace Prize Laureates were under arrest at the time of their awards: Carl von Ossietzky (in 1935), Aung San Suu Kyi (in 1991), Liu Xiaobo (in 2010), Ales Bialiatski (in 2022), and Narges Mohammadi (in 2023).

== Laureates ==
As of 2025, the Peace Prize has been awarded to 113 individuals and 28 organizations. Twenty women have won the Nobel Peace Prize, more than any other Nobel Prize. Only two recipients have won multiple Peace Prizes: the International Committee of the Red Cross has won three times (1917, 1944 and 1963) and the Office of the United Nations High Commissioner for Refugees has won twice (1954 and 1981). There have been 19 years in which the Peace Prize was not awarded.

| Year | Recipient(s) | | Country | Citation | | | |
|---|---|---|---|---|---|---|---|
| Year | 1901 | | Country | Citation | Henry Dunant (1828–1910) | Switzerland | "for his humanitarian efforts to help wounded soldiers and create international understanding" |
| | 1901 | Frédéric Passy (1822–1912) | France | "for his lifelong work for international peace conferences, diplomacy and arbitration." | | | |
| 1902 | | Élie Ducommun (1833–1906) | Switzerland | "for his untiring and skilful directorship of the Bern Peace Bureau" | | | |
| 1902 | | Charles Albert Gobat (1843–1914) | Switzerland | "for his eminently practical administration of the Inter-Parliamentary Union." | | | |
| 1903 | | Randal Cremer (1828–1908) | United Kingdom | "for his longstanding and devoted effort in favour of the ideas of peace and arbitration." | | | |
| 1904 | | Institute of International Law (founded 1873) | Belgium | "for its striving in public law to develop peaceful ties between nations and to make the laws of war more humane." | | | |
| 1905 | | Bertha von Suttner (1843–1914) | Austria-Hungary | "for her audacity to oppose the horrors of war." | | | |
| 1906 | | Theodore Roosevelt (1858–1919) | United States | "for his role in bringing to an end the bloody war recently waged between two of the world's great powers, Japan and Russia." | | | |
| 1907 | | Ernesto Teodoro Moneta (1833–1918) | Italy | "for his work in the press and in peace meetings, both public and private, for an understanding between France and Italy" | | | |
| 1907 | | Louis Renault (1843–1918) | France | "for his decisive influence upon the conduct and outcome of the Hague and Geneva Conferences." | | | |
| 1908 | | Klas Pontus Arnoldson (1844–1916) | Sweden | "for their long time work for the cause of peace as politicians, peace society leaders, orators and authors." | | | |
| 1908 | | Fredrik Bajer (1837–1922) | Denmark | "for their long time work for the cause of peace as politicians, peace society leaders, orators and authors." | | | |
| 1909 | | Auguste Beernaert (1829–1912) | Belgium | "for their prominent position in the international movement for peace and arbitration." | | | |
| 1909 | | Paul Henri d'Estournelles de Constant (1852–1924) | France | "for their prominent position in the international movement for peace and arbitration." | | | |
| 1910 | | Permanent International Peace Bureau (founded 1891) | Several | "for acting as a link between the peace societies of the various countries, and helping them to organize the world rallies of the international peace movement." | | | |
| 1911 | | Tobias Asser (1838–1913) | Netherlands | "for his role as co-founder of the Institut de droit international, initiator of the Conferences on International Private Law (Conférences de Droit international privé) at the Hague, and pioneer in the field of international legal relations" | | | |
| 1911 | | Alfred Fried (1864–1921) | Austria-Hungary | "for his effort to expose and fight what he considers to be the main cause of war, namely, the anarchy in international relations." | | | |
| 1912 | | Elihu Root^{[A]} (1845–1937) | United States | "for bringing about better understanding between the countries of North and South America and initiating important arbitration agreements between the United States and other countries." | | | |
| 1913 | | Henri La Fontaine (1854–1943) | Belgium | "for his unparalleled contribution to the organization of peaceful internationalism." | | | |
| 1914 | Not awarded due to World War I. | | | | | | |
| 1915 | Not awarded due to World War I. | | | | | | |
| 1916 | Not awarded due to World War I. | | | | | | |
| 1917 | | International Committee of the Red Cross (founded 1863) | ICRC | "for the efforts to take care of wounded soldiers and prisoners of war and their families." | | | |
| 1918 | Not awarded due to World War I. | | | | | | |
| 1919 | | Woodrow Wilson^{[A]} (1856–1924) | United States | "for his role as founder of the League of Nations." | | | |
| 1920 | | Léon Bourgeois (1851–1925) | France | "for his longstanding contribution to the cause of peace and justice and his prominent role in the establishment of the League of Nations." | | | |
| 1921 | | Hjalmar Branting (1860–1925) | Sweden | "for their lifelong contributions to the cause of peace and organized internationalism." | | | |
| 1921 | | Christian Lange (1869–1938) | Norway | "for their lifelong contributions to the cause of peace and organized internationalism." | | | |
| 1922 | | Fridtjof Nansen (1861–1930) | Norway | "for his leading role in the repatriation of prisoners of war, in international relief work and as the League of Nations' High Commissioner for refugees." | | | |
| 1923 | Not awarded | | | | | | |
| 1924 | Not awarded | | | | | | |
| 1925 | | Austen Chamberlain^{[A]} (1863–1937) | United Kingdom | "for his crucial role in bringing about the Locarno Treaty." | | | |
| 1925 | | Charles G. Dawes^{[A]} (1865–1951) | United States | "for his crucial role in bringing about the Dawes Plan." | | | |
| 1926 | | Aristide Briand (1862–1932) | France | "for their crucial role in bringing about the Locarno Treaty." | | | |
| 1926 | | Gustav Stresemann (1878–1929) | Germany | "for their crucial role in bringing about the Locarno Treaty." | | | |
| 1927 | | Ferdinand Buisson (1841–1932) | France | "for their contribution to the emergence in France and Germany of a public opinion which favours peaceful international cooperation." | | | |
| 1927 | | Ludwig Quidde (1858–1941) | Germany | "for their contribution to the emergence in France and Germany of a public opinion which favours peaceful international cooperation." | | | |
| 1928 | Not awarded | | | | | | |
| 1929 | | Frank B. Kellogg^{[A]} (1856–1937) | United States | "for his crucial role in bringing about the Kellogg-Briand Pact." | | | |
| 1930 | | Nathan Söderblom (1866–1931) | Sweden | "for promoting Christian unity and helping create 'that new attitude of mind which is necessary if peace between nations is to become reality'." | | | |
| 1931 | | Jane Addams (1860–1935) | United States | "for their assiduous effort to revive the ideal of peace and to rekindle the spirit of peace in their own nation and in the whole of mankind." | | | |
| 1931 | | Nicholas Murray Butler (1862–1947) | United States | "for their assiduous effort to revive the ideal of peace and to rekindle the spirit of peace in their own nation and in the whole of mankind." | | | |
| 1932 | Not awarded | | | | | | |
| 1933 | | Norman Angell^{[A]} (1872–1967) | United Kingdom | "for having exposed by his pen the illusion of war and presented a convincing plea for international cooperation and peace." | | | |
| 1934 | | Arthur Henderson (1863–1935) | United Kingdom | "for his untiring struggle and his courageous efforts as Chairman of the League of Nations Disarmament Conference 1931-34." | | | |
| 1935 | | Carl von Ossietzky^{[A]}^{[B]} (1889–1938) | Germany | "for his burning love for freedom of thought and expression and his valuable contribution to the cause of peace." | | | |
| 1936 | | Carlos Saavedra Lamas (1878–1959) | Argentina | "for his role as father of the Argentine Antiwar Pact of 1933, which he also used as a means to mediate peace between Paraguay and Bolivia in 1935." | | | |
| 1937 | | The Viscount Cecil of Chelwood (1864–1958) | United Kingdom | "for his tireless effort in support of the League of Nations, disarmament and peace." | | | |
| 1938 | | Nansen International Office for Refugees (1930–1939) | League of Nations | "for having carried on the work of Fridtjof Nansen to the benefit of refugees across Europe." | | | |
| 1939 | Not awarded due to World War II. | | | | | | |
| 1940 | Not awarded due to World War II. | | | | | | |
| 1941 | Not awarded due to World War II. | | | | | | |
| 1942 | Not awarded due to World War II. | | | | | | |
| 1943 | Not awarded due to World War II. | | | | | | |
| 1944 | | International Committee of the Red Cross^{[A]} (founded 1863) | ICRC | "for the great work it has performed during the war on behalf of humanity." | | | |
| 1945 | | Cordell Hull (1871–1955) | United States | "for his indefatigable work for international understanding and his pivotal role in establishing the United Nations." | | | |
| 1946 | | Emily Greene Balch (1867–1961) | United States | "for her lifelong work for the cause of peace" | | | |
| 1946 | | John Mott (1865–1955) | United States | "for his contribution to the creation of a peace-promoting religious brotherhood across national boundaries." | | | |
| 1947 | | American Friends Service Committee (founded 1917) | United States | "for their pioneering work in the international peace movement and compassionate effort to relieve human suffering, thereby promoting the fraternity between nations." | | | |
| 1947 | | Friends Service Council (founded 1927) | United Kingdom | "for their pioneering work in the international peace movement and compassionate effort to relieve human suffering, thereby promoting the fraternity between nations." | | | |
| 1948 | Not awarded because "there was no suitable living candidate." (A tribute to the recently assassinated Mohandas Gandhi in India.) | | | | | | |
| 1949 | | The Lord Boyd-Orr (1880–1971) | United Kingdom | "for his lifelong effort to conquer hunger and want, thereby helping to remove a major cause of military conflict and war." | | | |
| 1950 | | Ralph Bunche (1904–1971) | United States | "for his work as mediator in Palestine in 1948-1949." | | | |
| 1951 | | Léon Jouhaux (1879–1954) | France | "for having devoted his life to the fight against war through the promotion of social justice and brotherhood among men and nations." | | | |
| 1952 | | Albert Schweitzer^{[A]} (1875–1965) | France (born in Alsace-Lorraine) | "for his altruism, reverence for life, and tireless humanitarian work which has helped making the idea of brotherhood between men and nations a living one." | | | |
| 1953 | | George Marshall (1880–1959) | United States | "for proposing and supervising the plan for the economic recovery of Europe." | | | |
| 1954 | | Office of the United Nations High Commissioner for Refugees^{[A]} (founded 1950) | United Nations | "for its efforts to heal the wounds of war by providing help and protection to refugees all over the world." | | | |
| 1955 | Not awarded | | | | | | |
| 1956 | Not awarded | | | | | | |
| 1957 | | Lester B. Pearson (1897–1972) | Canada | "for his crucial contribution to the deployment of a United Nations Emergency Force in the wake of the Suez Crisis." | | | |
| 1958 | | Dominique Pire (1910–1969) | Belgium | "for his efforts to help refugees to leave their camps and return to a life of freedom and dignity." | | | |
| 1959 | | Philip Noel-Baker (1889–1982) | United Kingdom | "for his longstanding contribution to the cause of disarmament and peace." | | | |
| 1960 | | Albert Luthuli^{[A]} (1898–1967) | South Africa | "for his non-violent struggle against apartheid." | | | |
| 1961 | | Dag Hammarskjöld^{[C]} (1905–1961) | Sweden | "for developing the UN into an effective and constructive international organization, capable of giving life to the principles and aims expressed in the UN Charter." | | | |
| 1962 | | Linus Pauling^{[A]} (1901–1994) | United States | "for his fight against the nuclear arms race between East and West." | | | |
| 1963 | | International Committee of the Red Cross (founded 1863) | ICRC; IFRC | "for promoting the principles of the Geneva Convention and cooperation with the UN." | | | |
| 1963 | | League of Red Cross Societies (founded 1919) | ICRC; IFRC | "for promoting the principles of the Geneva Convention and cooperation with the UN." | | | |
| 1964 | | Martin Luther King Jr. (1929–1968) | United States | "for his non-violent struggle for civil rights for the Afro-American population." | | | |
| 1965 | | United Nations Children's Fund (UNICEF) (founded 1946) | United Nations | "for its effort to enhance solidarity between nations and reduce the difference between rich and poor states." | | | |
| 1966 | Not awarded due to the Norwegian Nobel Committee deciding that none of the nominations met the criteria in Nobel's will. | | | | | | |
| 1967 | Not awarded due to the Norwegian Nobel Committee deciding that none of the nominations met the criteria in Nobel's will. | | | | | | |
| 1968 | | René Cassin (1887–1976) | France | "for his struggle to ensure the rights of man as stipulated in the UN Declaration." | | | |
| 1969 | | International Labour Organization (founded 1919) | United Nations | "for creating international legislation insuring certain norms for working conditions in every country." | | | |
| 1970 | | Norman Borlaug (1914–2009) | United States | "for having given a well-founded hope - the green revolution." | | | |
| 1971 | | Willy Brandt (1913–1992) | West Germany | "for paving the way for a meaningful dialogue between East and West." | | | |
| 1972 | Not awarded | | | | | | |
| 1973 | | Henry Kissinger^{[D]} (1923–2023) | United States | "for jointly having negotiated a cease fire in Vietnam in 1973." | | | |
| 1973 | | Lê Đức Thọ^{[E]} (1911–1990) | North Vietnam | "for jointly having negotiated a cease fire in Vietnam in 1973." | | | |
| 1974 | | Seán MacBride (1904–1988) | Ireland | "for his efforts to secure and develop human rights throughout the world" | | | |
| 1974 | | Eisaku Satō (1901–1975) | Japan | "for his contribution to stabilize conditions in the Pacific rim area and for signing the Nuclear Non-Proliferation Treaty." | | | |
| 1975 | | Andrei Sakharov^{[F]} (1921–1989) | Soviet Union | "for his struggle for human rights in the Soviet Union, for disarmament and cooperation between all nations." | | | |
| 1976 | | Mairead Maguire (b. 1944) | United Kingdom | "for the courageous efforts in founding a movement to put an end to the violent conflict in Northern Ireland." | | | |
| 1976 | | Betty Williams (1943–2020) | United Kingdom | "for the courageous efforts in founding a movement to put an end to the violent conflict in Northern Ireland." | | | |
| 1977 | | Amnesty International (founded 1961) | United Kingdom | "for worldwide respect for human rights." | | | |
| 1978 | | Menachem Begin (1913–1992) | Israel | "for jointly having negotiated peace between Egypt and Israel in 1978." | | | |
| 1978 | | Anwar Sadat (1918–1981) | Egypt | "for jointly having negotiated peace between Egypt and Israel in 1978." | | | |
| 1979 | | Mother Teresa (1910–1997) | Albania | "for her work for bringing help to suffering humanity." | | | |
| 1980 | | Adolfo Pérez Esquivel (b. 1931) | Argentina | "for being a source of inspiration to repressed people, especially in Latin America." | | | |
| 1981 | | Office of the United Nations High Commissioner for Refugees (founded 1950) | United Nations | "for promoting the fundamental rights of refugees." | | | |
| 1982 | | Alfonso García Robles (1911–1991) | Mexico | "for their work for disarmament and nuclear and weapon-free zones." | | | |
| 1982 | | Alva Myrdal (1902–1986) | Sweden | "for their work for disarmament and nuclear and weapon-free zones." | | | |
| 1983 | | Lech Wałęsa^{[G]} (b. 1943) | Poland | "for non-violent struggle for free trade unions and human rights in Poland." | | | |
| 1984 | | Desmond Tutu (1931–2021) | South Africa | "for his role as a unifying leader figure in the non-violent campaign to resolve the problem of apartheid in South Africa" | | | |
| 1985 | | International Physicians for the Prevention of Nuclear War (founded 1980) | United States | "for spreading authoritative information and by creating awareness of the catastrophic consequences of nuclear war." | | | |
| 1986 | | Elie Wiesel (1928–2016) | United States (born in Romania | "for being a messenger to mankind: his message is one of peace, atonement and dignity." | | | |
| 1987 | | Óscar Arias (b. 1940) | Costa Rica | "for his work for lasting peace in Central America." | | | |
| 1988 | | United Nations Peace-Keeping Forces (founded 1945) | United Nations | "for preventing armed clashes and creating conditions for negotiations." | | | |
| 1989 | | Tenzin Gyatso, 14th Dalai Lama (b. 1935) | India (born in Tibet) | "for advocating peaceful solutions based upon tolerance and mutual respect in order to preserve the historical and cultural heritage of his people." | | | |
| 1990 | | Mikhail Gorbachev (1931–2022) | Soviet Union | "for the leading role he played in the radical changes in East-West relations." | | | |
| 1991 | | Aung San Suu Kyi^{[H]} (b. 1945) | Myanmar | "for her non-violent struggle for democracy and human rights." | | | |
| 1992 | | Rigoberta Menchú (b. 1959) | Guatemala | "for her struggle for social justice and ethno-cultural reconciliation based on respect for the rights of indigenous peoples." | | | |
| 1993 | | F. W. de Klerk (1936–2021) | South Africa | "for their work for the peaceful termination of the apartheid regime, and for laying the foundations for a new democratic South Africa." | | | |
| 1993 | | Nelson Mandela (1918–2013) | South Africa | "for their work for the peaceful termination of the apartheid regime, and for laying the foundations for a new democratic South Africa." | | | |
| 1994 | | Yasser Arafat (1929–2004) | Palestine | "for their efforts to create peace in the Middle East." | | | |
| 1994 | | Shimon Peres (1923–2016) | Israel | "for their efforts to create peace in the Middle East." | | | |
| 1994 | | Yitzhak Rabin (1922–1995) | Israel | "for their efforts to create peace in the Middle East." | | | |
| 1995 | | Pugwash Conferences on Science and World Affairs (founded 1957) | Canada | "for their efforts to diminish the part played by nuclear arms in international politics and, in the longer run, to eliminate such arms." | | | |
| 1995 | | Joseph Rotblat (1908–2005) | Poland | "for their efforts to diminish the part played by nuclear arms in international politics and, in the longer run, to eliminate such arms." | | | |
| 1996 | | Carlos Filipe Ximenes Belo (b. 1948) | East Timor | "for their work towards a just and peaceful solution to the conflict in East Timor." | | | |
| 1996 | | José Ramos-Horta (b. 1949) | East Timor | "for their work towards a just and peaceful solution to the conflict in East Timor." | | | |
| 1997 | | International Campaign to Ban Landmines (founded 1992) | Switzerland | "for their work for the banning and clearing of anti-personnel mines." | | | |
| 1997 | | Jody Williams (b. 1950) | United States | "for their work for the banning and clearing of anti-personnel mines." | | | |
| 1998 | | John Hume (1937–2020) | Ireland | "for their efforts to find a peaceful solution to the conflict in Northern Ireland." | | | |
| 1998 | | David Trimble (1944–2022) | United Kingdom | "for their efforts to find a peaceful solution to the conflict in Northern Ireland." | | | |
| 1999 | | Médecins Sans Frontières | Switzerland | "in recognition of the organization's pioneering humanitarian work on several continents." | | | |
| 2000 | | Kim Dae-jung (1924–2009) | South Korea | "for his work for democracy and human rights in South Korea and in East Asia in general, and for peace and reconciliation with North Korea in particular." | | | |
| 2001 | | United Nations | United Nations | "for their work for a better organized and more peaceful world." | | | |
| 2001 | | Kofi Annan (1938–2018) | Ghana | "for their work for a better organized and more peaceful world." | | | |
| 2002 | | Jimmy Carter (1924–2024) | United States | "for his decades of untiring effort to find peaceful solutions to international conflicts, to advance democracy and human rights, and to promote economic and social development." | | | |
| 2003 | | Shirin Ebadi (b. 1947) | Iran | "for her efforts for democracy and human rights, focusing especially on the rights of women and children." | | | |
| 2004 | | Wangari Maathai (1940–2011) | Kenya | "for her contribution to sustainable development, democracy and peace." | | | |
| 2005 | | International Atomic Energy Agency (founded 1957) | United Nations | "for their efforts to prevent nuclear energy from being used for military purposes and to ensure that nuclear energy for peaceful purposes is used in the safest possible way." | | | |
| 2005 | | Mohamed ElBaradei (b. 1942) | Egypt | "for their efforts to prevent nuclear energy from being used for military purposes and to ensure that nuclear energy for peaceful purposes is used in the safest possible way." | | | |
| 2006 | | Grameen Bank (founded 1983) | Bangladesh | "for their efforts to create social and economic development from below." | | | |
| 2006 | | Muhammad Yunus (b. 1940) | Bangladesh | "for their efforts to create social and economic development from below." | | | |
| 2007 | | Intergovernmental Panel on Climate Change (founded 1988) | United Nations | "for their efforts to build up and disseminate greater knowledge about man-made climate change, and to lay the foundations for the measures that are needed to counteract such change." | | | |
| 2007 | | Al Gore (b. 1948) | United States | "for their efforts to build up and disseminate greater knowledge about man-made climate change, and to lay the foundations for the measures that are needed to counteract such change." | | | |
| 2008 | | Martti Ahtisaari (1937–2023) | Finland | "for his important efforts, on several continents and over more than three decades, to resolve international conflicts." | | | |
| 2009 | | Barack Obama (b. 1961) | United States | "for his extraordinary efforts to strengthen international diplomacy and cooperation between peoples." | | | |
| 2010 | | Liu Xiaobo^{[I]} (1955–2017) | China | "for his long and non-violent struggle for fundamental human rights in China." | | | |
| 2011 | | Leymah Gbowee (b. 1972) | Liberia | "for their non-violent struggle for the safety of women and for women's rights to full participation in peace-building work." | | | |
| 2011 | | Ellen Johnson Sirleaf (b. 1938) | Liberia | "for their non-violent struggle for the safety of women and for women's rights to full participation in peace-building work." | | | |
| 2011 | | Tawakkol Karman (b. 1979) | Yemen | "for their non-violent struggle for the safety of women and for women's rights to full participation in peace-building work." | | | |
| 2012 | | European Union (founded 1958) | European Union | "for over six decades contributed to the advancement of peace and reconciliation, democracy and human rights in Europe." | | | |
| 2013 | | Organisation for the Prohibition of Chemical Weapons (founded 1997) | Netherlands | "for its extensive efforts to eliminate chemical weapons." | | | |
| 2014 | | Kailash Satyarthi (b. 1954) | India | "for their struggle against the suppression of children and young people and for the right of all children to education." | | | |
| 2014 | | Malala Yousafzai (b. 1997) | Pakistan | "for their struggle against the suppression of children and young people and for the right of all children to education." | | | |
| 2015 | | Tunisian National Dialogue Quartet (2013–2014) | Tunisia | "for its decisive contribution to the building of a pluralistic democracy in Tunisia in the wake of the Jasmine Revolution of 2011." | | | |
| 2016 | | Juan Manuel Santos (b. 1951) | Colombia | "for his resolute efforts to bring the country's more than 50-year-long civil war to an end." | | | |
| 2017 | | International Campaign to Abolish Nuclear Weapons (founded 2007) | Switzerland | "for its work to draw attention to the catastrophic humanitarian consequences of any use of nuclear weapons and for its ground-breaking efforts to achieve a treaty-based prohibition of such weapons." | | | |
| 2018 | | Denis Mukwege (b. 1955) | Democratic Republic of the Congo | "for their efforts to end the use of sexual violence as a weapon of war and armed conflict." | | | |
| 2018 | | Nadia Murad (b. 1993) | Iraq | "for their efforts to end the use of sexual violence as a weapon of war and armed conflict." | | | |
| 2019 | | Abiy Ahmed (b. 1976) | Ethiopia | "for his efforts to achieve peace and international cooperation, and in particular for his decisive initiative to resolve the border conflict with neighbouring Eritrea." | | | |
| 2020 | | World Food Programme (founded 1961) | United Nations | "for its efforts to combat hunger, for its contribution to bettering conditions for peace in conflict-affected areas and for acting as a driving force in efforts to prevent the use of hunger as a weapon of war and conflict." | | | |
| 2021 | | Dmitry Muratov (b. 1961) | Russia | "for their efforts to safeguard freedom of expression, which is a precondition for democracy and lasting peace." | | | |
| 2021 | | Maria Ressa (b. 1963) | Philippines | "for their efforts to safeguard freedom of expression, which is a precondition for democracy and lasting peace." | | | |
| 2022 | | Centre for Civil Liberties (founded 2007) | Ukraine | "The Peace Prize laureates represent civil society in their home countries. They have for many years promoted the right to criticise power and protect the fundamental rights of citizens. They have made an outstanding effort to document war crimes, human right abuses and the abuse of power. Together they demonstrate the significance of civil society for peace and democracy." | | | |
| 2022 | | Memorial (founded 1989) | Russia | "The Peace Prize laureates represent civil society in their home countries. They have for many years promoted the right to criticise power and protect the fundamental rights of citizens. They have made an outstanding effort to document war crimes, human right abuses and the abuse of power. Together they demonstrate the significance of civil society for peace and democracy." | | | |
| 2022 | | Ales Bialiatski^{[J]} (b. 1962) | Belarus | "The Peace Prize laureates represent civil society in their home countries. They have for many years promoted the right to criticise power and protect the fundamental rights of citizens. They have made an outstanding effort to document war crimes, human right abuses and the abuse of power. Together they demonstrate the significance of civil society for peace and democracy." | | | |
| 2023 | | Narges Mohammadi^{[K]} (b. 1972) | Iran | "for her fight against the oppression of women in Iran and her fight to promote human rights and freedom for all" | | | |
| 2024 | | Nihon Hidankyo (founded 1956) | Japan | "for its efforts to achieve a world free of nuclear weapons and for demonstrating through witness testimony that nuclear weapons must never be used again" | | | |
| 2025 | | María Corina Machado^{[L]} (b. 1967) | Venezuela | "for her tireless work promoting democratic rights for the people of Venezuela and for her struggle to achieve a just and peaceful transition from dictatorship to democracy." | | | |
| 2026 | | Navi Pillay (b. 1941) | South Africa | "for her efforts to promote peace and international law" | | | |

== Laureates by category ==
| Category | Total |
|---|---|
| Men | 93 |
| Women | 21 |
| International organizations | 27 |
| Not awarded | 19 |

== Laureates per country ==
| Country | Laureates |
|---|---|
| United States | 23 |
| United Kingdom | 12 |
| Switzerland | 11 |
| United Nations / League of Nations | 10 |
| France | 9 |
| South Africa | 5 |
| Sweden | 5 |
| Belgium | 4 |
| Germany / West Germany | 4 |
| Russia / Soviet Union | 4 |
| Israel | 3 |
| India | 3 |
| Austria-Hungary | 2 |
| Norway | 2 |
| Netherlands | 2 |
| Argentina | 2 |
| Canada | 2 |
| Ireland | 2 |
| Egypt | 2 |
| Poland | 2 |
| East Timor | 2 |
| Iran | 2 |
| Bangladesh | 2 |
| Liberia | 2 |
| Japan | 2 |
| Italy | 1 |
| Denmark | 1 |
| North Vietnam | 1 |
| Palestine | 1 |
| Mexico | 1 |
| Costa Rica | 1 |
| Myanmar | 1 |
| Guatemala | 1 |
| South Korea | 1 |
| Ghana | 1 |
| Kenya | 1 |
| Finland | 1 |
| China | 1 |
| Yemen | 1 |
| European Union | 1 |
| Pakistan | 1 |
| Tunisia | 1 |
| Colombia | 1 |
| Democratic Republic of the Congo | 1 |
| Iraq | 1 |
| Ethiopia | 1 |
| Philippines | 1 |
| Belarus | 1 |
| Ukraine | 1 |
| Romania | 1 |
| Tibet | 1 |
| Venezuela | 1 |

== See also ==
- List of Nobel laureates
- List of peace activists
- List of organizations nominated for the Nobel Peace Prize
- PRIO Director's Shortlist

== Notes ==
^{A} The following laureates were all awarded their respective Prizes one year late because the Committee decided that none of the nominations in the year in which they are listed as being awarded the Prize met the criteria in Nobel's will; per its rules the Committee delayed the awarding of the Prizes until the next year, although they were awarded as the previous year's Prize:

Elihu Root (1912), Woodrow Wilson (1919), Austen Chamberlain (1925), Charles G. Dawes (1925), Frank B. Kellogg (1929), Norman Angell (1933), Carl von Ossietzky (1935), International Committee of the Red Cross (1944), Albert Schweitzer (1952), Office of the United Nations High Commissioner for Refugees (1954), Albert Lutuli (1960), Linus Pauling (1962)

^{B} Carl von Ossietzky's Prize was awarded in absentia because he was imprisoned and was refused a passport by the government of Germany.
^{C} Dag Hammarskjöld's Prize was awarded posthumously.
^{D} Henry Kissinger's Prize was awarded in absentia because he did not want to become a target of anti-war protesters.
^{E} Lê Đức Thọ declined to accept the Prize.
^{F} Andrei Sakharov's Prize was awarded in absentia because he was refused a passport by the government of the Soviet Union.
^{G} Lech Wałęsa's Prize was awarded in absentia because he was refused a passport by the government of Poland.
^{H} Aung San Suu Kyi's Prize was awarded in absentia because she was being held prisoner by the government of Myanmar. Following her release from house arrest and election to the Pyithu Hluttaw, Suu Kyi accepted her award in person on 16 June 2012.
^{I} Liu Xiaobo's Prize was awarded in absentia because he was imprisoned in China.
^{J} Ales Bialiatski's Prize was awarded in absentia because he was imprisoned in Belarus.
^{K} Narges Mohammadi's Prize was awarded in absentia because she was imprisoned in Iran.
^{L} Machado gave her medal to U.S. President Donald Trump, though this is not recognized since "a Nobel Prize can neither be revoked, shared, nor transferred to others. Once the announcement has been made, the decision stands for all time."

== Sources ==
- "All Nobel Peace Prize Laureates". Nobel Foundation. Archived from the original on 1 August 2022.
- "Winners of the Nobel Prize for Peace". Encyclopædia Britannica. Archived from the original on 5 September 2015.
- Rogers, Simon (8 October 2010). "Nobel peace prize winners list 2010: how does Liu Xiaobo compare to previous medal holders?". The Guardian. Archived from the original on 11 April 2020.
