= 1970 Nobel Peace Prize =

Award

- Norman Borlaug
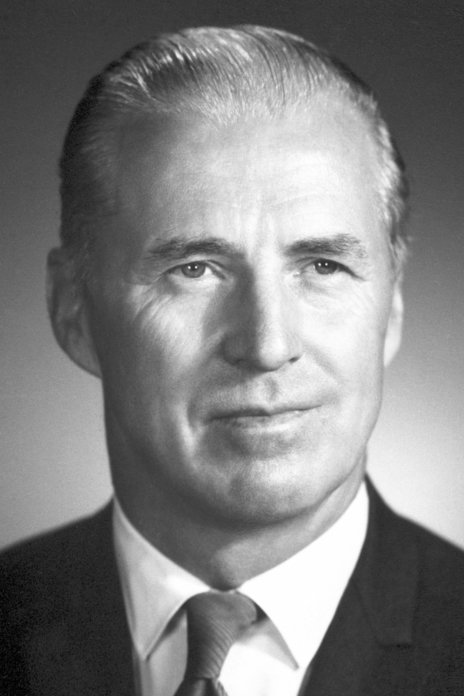
- "for having given a well-founded hope – the green revolution."
- Date: 21 October 1970 (announcement); 10 December 1970 (ceremony)
- Location: Oslo, Norway
- Presented by: Norwegian Nobel Committee
- First award: 1901
- Website: Official website

The 1970 Nobel Peace Prize was awarded to the American agronomist Norman Borlaug (1914–2009) "for having given a well-founded hope - the green revolution." He is the thirteenth American recipient of the Peace Prize.

== Laureate ==
=== Norman Borlaug ===
In 1937, Norman Ernest Borlaug receive his B.S. degree in forestry and Ph.D in plant pathology and genetics at the University of Minnesota in 1942. He became a researcher at the International Maize and Wheat Improvement Center in Mexico where he recommended improved methods of cultivation and developed semi-dwarf, high-yield, disease-resistant wheat varieties, making the country self-sufficient in grain from the 1950s onwards. His success in Mexico made him a much sought-after adviser to countries whose food production was not keeping pace with their population growth. During the mid-20th century, Borlaug led the introduction of these methods and researches combined with modern agricultural production techniques to Pakistan and India. The increasing success of wheat productions earned him the title "father of the Green Revolution" and is often credited with saving over a billion people worldwide from starvation. In recognition of his contributions to world peace through increasing food supply, he was given the Nobel Peace Prize by the Norwegian Nobel Committee.

== Deliberations ==
=== Nominations ===
Borlaug received five nominations before he was awarded the peace prize. His first nomination came in 1968 by Roscoe L. Barrel of the United States as a joint nominee with The Rockefeller Foundation. In 1970, he earned two nominations from 14 members of the Swedish parliament and two Norwegian politicians.

In total, the Norwegian Nobel Committee received 70 nominations for 28 individuals and 11 organizations such as Abbé Pierre, Vinoba Bhave, Danilo Dolci, Clarence Streit, Elie Wiesel, UNESCO, the Amnesty International (awarded in 1977) and the Universal Esperanto Association. Twelve were newly nominated such as François Duvalier, Hélder Câmara, Eugene Carson Blake, Isaac Lewin, the International Fellowship of Reconciliation (IFOR) and the International Institute for Strategic Studies (IISS). The most nominated was the Brazilian archbishop Hélder Câmara with nine nominations. There were only two female nominees and both were Swedish: Alva Myrdal (awarded in 1982) and Britta Holmström. Notable figures like Archibald Baxter, Doris Blackburn, Vera Brittain, Charles de Gaulle, Ammon Hennacy, Richard Hofstadter, Edmond Michelet, H. James Shea Jr. and Helene Stähelin died in 1970 without having been nominated for the peace prize.

Official list of nominees and their nominators for the prize
No.	Nominee	Country/ Headquarters	Motivations	Nominator(s)
Individuals
1	Abbé Pierre, OFMCap (1912–2007)	France	"for his great contribution as an individual to the cause of peace and for his accomplishments astounding the youths all over the world and driving them to action."	Lars Roar Langslet (1936–2016)
2	Vinoba Bhave (1895–1982)	India	"as a representative of non-violent mentality and for his efforts to socially liberate the Indian people."	Erling Wikborg (1894–1992)
3	Eugene Carson Blake (1906–1985)	United States	"for having taken great steps in trying to bring world peace."	Jerome Waldie (1925–2009)
4	Charles K. Bliss (1897–1985)	Soviet Union (Ukraine); Austria	"[with Chisholm] for creating a most valuable tool for peace through their literary works."	Doug Everingham (1923–2017)
5	Norman Borlaug (1914–2009)	United States	"for his work to promote global food supply, an act that contributes greatly to peace."	14 members of the Swedish Parliament
5	Norman Borlaug (1914–2009)	United States	"for his important work to diminish hunger as a contributing factor to maintain and secure peace."	Kåre Kristiansen (1920–2005); Erland Steenberg (1919–2009)
6	Hélder Câmara (1909–1999)	Brazil	"for his work to promote development as a foundation for peace and his belief that progress must be made in a non-violent way."	Brendan Corish (1918–1990)
6	Hélder Câmara (1909–1999)	Brazil	"for his work to promote development as a foundation for peace and his belief that progress must be made in a non-violent way."	14 members of the Irish Parliament
6	Hélder Câmara (1909–1999)	Brazil	"in recognition of his important contributions to peace and social justice."	3 members of the Swedish Parliament
6	Hélder Câmara (1909–1999)	Brazil	"for his work for economic and social development for the poor in Brazil."	members of the French Parliament and professors
6	Hélder Câmara (1909–1999)	Brazil	"for his peaceful struggle for the improvement of the human living conditions."	René Cassin (1887–1976)
6	Hélder Câmara (1909–1999)	Brazil	No motivation included.	Liam Cosgrave (1920–2017)
6	Hélder Câmara (1909–1999)	Brazil	No motivation included.	Bram van der Lek (1931–2013)
6	Hélder Câmara (1909–1999)	Brazil	No motivation included.	Everhardus Hubertus Kraaijvanger (1899–1978)
6	Hélder Câmara (1909–1999)	Brazil	No motivation included.	6 members of the Dutch Parliament
7	Sanjib Chaudhuri (?)	India	"for his authorship of treaties important to the world order and his services to humanity."	Devaprasad P. Chaudhuri (?)
8	Brock Chisholm (1896–1971)	Canada	"[with Bliss] for creating a most valuable tool for peace through their literary works."	Doug Everingham (1923–2017)
9	John Collins (1910–1988)	United Kingdom	"for his devoted and selfless work towards peace through the promotion of communication and friendship between groups that harbor animosity towards each other."	Sven Nyman (1910–1988)
9	John Collins (1910–1988)	United Kingdom	"for work in the field of race relations and his courage and resolution in pursuing what he believes to be right."	Jock Campbell (1912–1994)
9	John Collins (1910–1988)	United Kingdom	No motivation included.	Harold Collison (1909–1995)
9	John Collins (1910–1988)	United Kingdom	No motivation included.	L. A. Pavitt (?)
10	Mehr Chand Davar (1913–1977)	India	"for working ceaselessly and devotedly for the cause of national and international peace and promoting Hindu–Muslim unity."	Harcharan Singh Dugal (1931–2020)
10	Mehr Chand Davar (1913–1977)	India	"for his efforts to create peace, lift the spirits of men, and establish divine socialism."	Giani Gurmukh Singh Musafir (1899–976)
10	Mehr Chand Davar (1913–1977)	India	"for his efforts towards word peace and international amity, and his endeavors to create an atmosphere for Indo-Pakistani friendship."	Lalit Sen (1932–1985)
10	Mehr Chand Davar (1913–1977)	India	"for his ceaseless efforts for prevent the partition of India, and his devotion towards Hindu–Muslim unity, unity of mankind and world peace."	Randhir Singh (1922–2016)
10	Mehr Chand Davar (1913–1977)	India	"for his earnest struggles towards Hindu-Muslim unity, Indo-Pakistani friendship, understanding and world peace."	Syed Badrudduja (1900–1974)
11	Josué de Castro (1908–1973)	Brazil	"for his active part in all organizations working for world peace."	John Boyd Orr (1880–1971)
12	Danilo Dolci (1924–1997)	Italy	"for his work ethics, methods and results which have contributed to peace in larger and smaller contexts."	Viola Sandell (1910–1999)
13	François Duvalier (1907–1971)	Haiti	"for his philosophy and his work for the poor masses of his country."	Clovis C. Kernisan (1885–?)
14	Raoul Follereau (1903–1977)	France	"for his exemplary devotion to the cause of the lepers, with a decisive influence on the outcome of the battle against leprosy."	Gaston Thorn (1928–2007)
15	Alfonso García Robles (1911–1991)	Mexico	"for his support of disarmament in Latin-America and almost making it a non-nuclear zone."	Philip Noel-Baker (1889–1982)
16	Paul G. Hoffman (1891–1974)	United States	"for his impressive work as administrator of the United Nations Development Programme."	Edvard Hambro (1911–1977)
16	Paul G. Hoffman (1891–1974)	United States	"for his work as a pioneer of multilateral development and his admirable contribution to peace in the field of international co-operation."	Hugh Foot, Baron Caradon (1907–1990)
17	Britta Holmström (1911–1992)	Sweden	"for her pioneering work with refugees, initiating Praghjälpen (Prague Aid) and contributing greatly to the possibility of world peace."	4 members of the Swedish Parliament
17	Britta Holmström (1911–1992)	Sweden	"for her pioneering work with refugees, initiating Praghjälpen (Prague Aid) and contributing greatly to the possibility of world peace."	Sture Petrén (1908–1976)
17	Britta Holmström (1911–1992)	Sweden	No motivation included.	members of the Norwegian Parliament
18	Marc Joux (?)	France	"for bringing forth ideas that may create a movement to facilitate a broad and solid international understanding in a climate of détente and security."	Auguste Billiemaz (1903–1983)
19	Spurgeon Milton Keeny (1893–1988)	United States	"for his pioneering work in development operations and his dedicated service to humanity."	Chester Jarvis (1921–2009)
20	Isaac Lewin (1906–1995)	United States	"for his literary works and his fight against discrimination and for the promotion of human rights."	Leonard Farbstein (1902–1993)
21	Gunnar Myrdal (1898–1987)	Sweden	"for their many services to the international community and their promotion of international understanding."	Laurence Naish (1915–1989)
22	Alva Reimer–Myrdal (1902–1986)	Sweden	"for their many services to the international community and their promotion of international understanding."	Laurence Naish (1915–1989)
23	Kathiresu Ramachandra (1895–1976)	Sri Lanka	"for his selfless dedication and contribution to the mission of universal love and peace."	Shirley Corea (1906–1974)
24	Clarence Streit (1896–1986)	United States	"in recognition of the thirty years he has devoted to advancing peace through federal union."	Lee Metcalf (1911–1978)
25	Alfred Verdroß-Droßberg (1890–1980)	Austria	"for his works, teachings, and efforts to strengthen solidarity between peoples and establish a world order that promotes the well-being of mankind."	Josef Klaus (1910–2001)
26	Paul Dudley White (1886–1973)	United States	"for his extraordinary merit for peaceful understanding and friendly cooperation between cardiologists all over the world."	Oldrich Starý (1884–1971)
27	Elie Wiesel (1928–2016)	Romania; United States	"for being a messenger of peace and brotherhood, fighting in for the cause of human rights and building bridges between generations through his literary works."	Jean Halpérin (1921–2012)
27	Elie Wiesel (1928–2016)	Romania; United States	"on the grounds of his powerful and uniquely influential portrait in his literary work The Jews of Silence and his candor, fairness, and clear trust in mankind despite all that has happened in our time."	Maurice S. Friedman (1921–2012)
27	Elie Wiesel (1928–2016)	Romania; United States	"for his courageous and profoundly intelligent efforts to hinder separation of peoples and promote true human connection."	Jean Ziegler (b. 1934)
27	Elie Wiesel (1928–2016)	Romania; United States	"for his literary works and their ability to communicate to a younger generation how to speak without hatred, even after witnessing man's inhumanity towards other men."	Walter Kaufmann (1921–1980)
28	Quincy Wright (1890–1970)	United States	"for his work as an international jurist, social scientist, and pioneer of peace research."	5 professors from American universities
Organizations
29	Amnesty International (founded in 1961)	London	"for their tireless efforts to better the conditions of political prisoners."	Rudolf Sieverts (1903–1980)
29	Amnesty International (founded in 1961)	London	No motivation included.	Johan Vogt (1900–1991)
30	American Fellowship of Reconciliation (founded in 1915)	New York City	"for their service to peace, humanity, and reconciliation."	Bronson P. Clark (1918–2004)
31	International Fellowship of Reconciliation (IFOR) (founded in 1914)	Amsterdam	"for their service to peace, humanity, and reconciliation."	Bronson P. Clark (1918–2004)
32	International Institute for Strategic Studies (IISS) (founded in 1958)	London	"for its publications which are a great contribution to securing peace."	Carl Friedrich von Weizsäcker (1912–2007)
33	International Union for Land Value Taxation and Free Trade (The IU) (founded in 1926)	London	No motivation included.	Francis Douglas (1889–1980)
34	Islands of Peace (founded in 1958)	Huy	No motivation included.	Raymond Vander Elst (1914–2008)
35	Joint Church Aid (JCA) (founded in 1967)	New York City	"for its efforts to provide relief to civilian victims of the Nigerian-Biafran War and for the example they provide for alleviating the crises which will probably occur in the future."	Marx W. Wartofsky (1928–1997); Abner Shimony (1928–2015)
35	Joint Church Aid (JCA) (founded in 1967)	New York City	"for its efforts to provide relief to civilian victims of the Nigerian-Biafran War and effectively reducing the rate of starvation in Biafra."	Roderick Firth (1917–1987)
36	Shop Stewards of the Belfast Shipyards	Belfast	"for their devoted efforts to prevent sectarian violence breaking out in the shipyards and contributing to inter-communal peace."	members of the Irish Parliament
37	United Nations Educational, Scientific and Cultural Organization (UNESCO) (founded in 1945)	Paris	"for its contribution to develop a spirit of harmony and brotherhood through education."	Saroite Okacha (?)
37	United Nations Educational, Scientific and Cultural Organization (UNESCO) (founded in 1945)	Paris	"for its work in the field of international understanding and facilitating the acquisition of knowledge, as it is a necessary condition for peace."	Daya Krishna (1924–2007)
37	United Nations Educational, Scientific and Cultural Organization (UNESCO) (founded in 1945)	Paris	"for its devotion to peace and its desire to spread education, science and culture by whatever means are within its reach."	9 members of the Mexican Senate
37	United Nations Educational, Scientific and Cultural Organization (UNESCO) (founded in 1945)	Paris	No motivation included.	José Luis Villar Palasí (1922–2012); Gregorio López-Bravo (1923–1985)
38	Universal Esperanto Association (UEA) (founded in 1908)	Rotterdam	"for its long-standing work for international understanding and peace."	Harold Davies (1904–1985)
38	Universal Esperanto Association (UEA) (founded in 1908)	Rotterdam	"for its long-standing work for international understanding and peace."	John Forrester (1924–2007)
38	Universal Esperanto Association (UEA) (founded in 1908)	Rotterdam	"for its long-standing work for international understanding and world peace through its efforts to solve the world language problem."	Eric Moonman (1929–2017)
38	Universal Esperanto Association (UEA) (founded in 1908)	Rotterdam	"for its outstanding contribution to the UN's International Co-operation Year and the International Year for Human Rights."	Robert Cant (1915–1997)
38	Universal Esperanto Association (UEA) (founded in 1908)	Rotterdam	"for its great idealistic and practical work, and in recognition of its contribution to peaceful co-operation through the utilization of an international language."	Kristen Helveg Petersen (1909–1997)
38	Universal Esperanto Association (UEA) (founded in 1908)	Rotterdam	"for its outstanding contribution to the UN's International Co-operation Year and the International Year for Human Rights, as well as their fight against discrimination of the languages of small countries."	Hans Hammond Rossbach (1931–2012)
38	Universal Esperanto Association (UEA) (founded in 1908)	Rotterdam	No motivation included.	members of the Danish Parliament
39	Women's International League for Peace and Freedom (WILPF) (founded in 1915)	Geneva	No motivation included.	Marie Lous Mohr (1892–1973)

== Norwegian Nobel Committee ==
The following members of the Norwegian Nobel Committee appointed by the Storting were responsible for the selection of the 1970 Nobel laureate in accordance with the will of Alfred Nobel:

1970 Norwegian Nobel Committee
Picture	Name	Position	Political Party	Other posts
	Aase Lionæs (1907–1999)	Chairwoman	Labour	Vice President of the Lagting (1965–1973)
	Bernt Ingvaldsen (1902–1982)	Member	Conservative	President of the Storting (1965–1972)
	Helge Refsum (1897–1976)	Member	Centre	former Judge at the Gulating Court (1922–1949)
	Helge Rognlien (1920–2001)	Member	Liberal	Minister of Local Government (1970–1971)
	John Sanness (1913–1984)	Member	Labour	Director of the Norwegian Institute of International Affairs (1960–1983)
