= Claire Vellut =

Belgian leprologist and humanist

- Born: 29 October 1926; Antwerp, Belgium
- Died: 20 September 2013 (aged 86); Brussels, Belgium
- Resting place: Banneux cemetery 50.5379°N 5.7401°E
- Other name: Claire Marie Jeanne Vellut
- Occupations: Leprologist, social worker
- Years active: 1954–2013
- Known for: Damien Foundation India Trust
- Parent(s): Fernand Evariste Marc Alfred Vellut; Lucie Roebroek
- Awards: Padma Shri; Stree Ratna Award; Raoul Follereau Award; Grand Cross of the Order of the Crown; Indira Gandhi Award

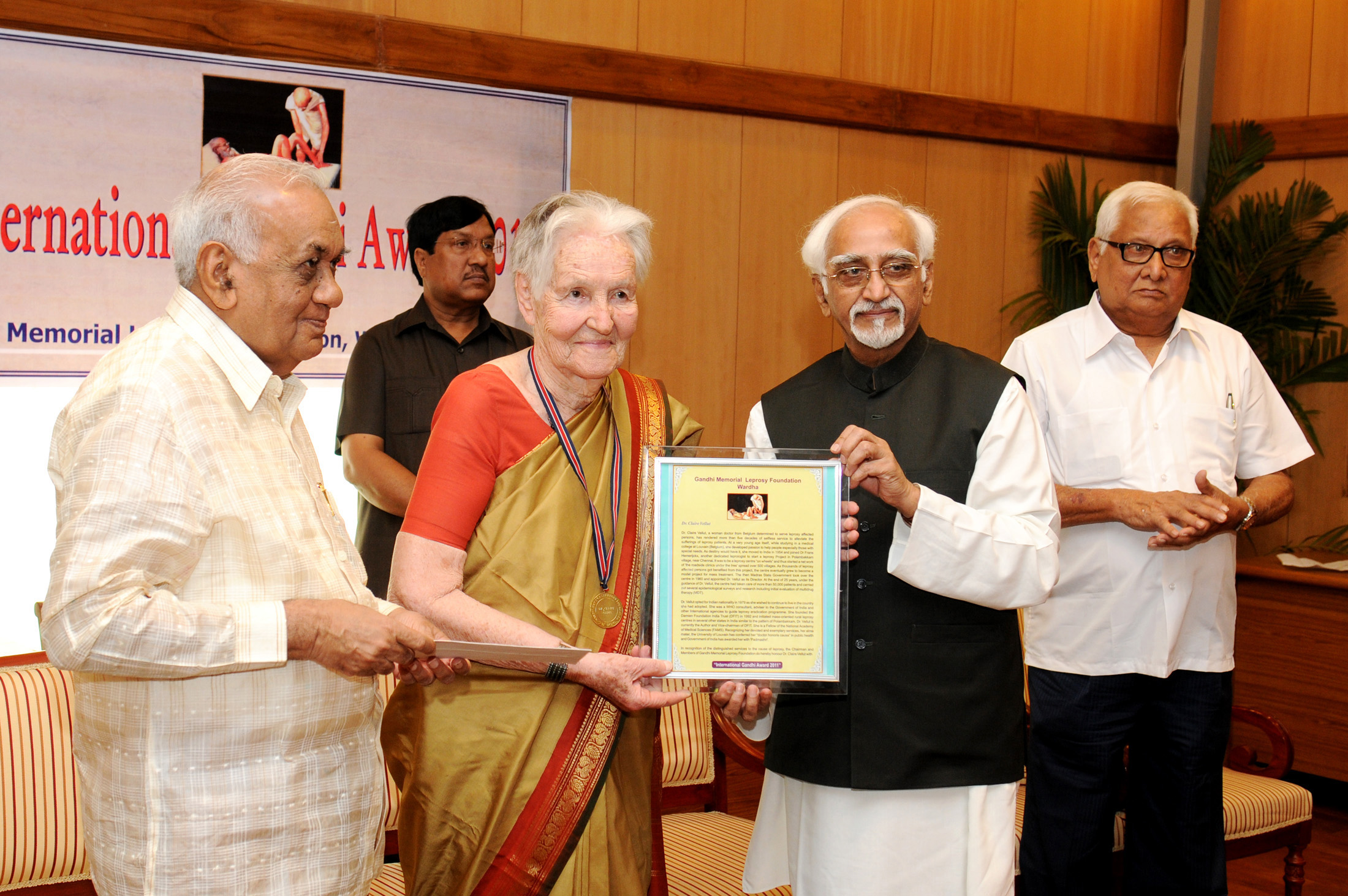
In 2012, Vice President, Mohd. Hamid Ansari presenting the “International Gandhi Award - 2011” to Dr. Claire Vellut, at a function, New Delhi, organized by the Gandhi Memorial Leprosy Foundation.

Claire Marie Jeanne Vellut (1926–2013) was a Belgian-born naturalised Indian leprologist, humanist and the founder of the Damien Foundation India Trust, a non profit non governmental organization engaged in providing treatment and rehabilitation services to people with leprosy and tuberculosis in India. She spent 55 years in India treating leprosy and tuberculosis patients, associating with the state and central governments or independently under the aegis of the trust she founded in 1955. The Government of India awarded her the fourth highest Indian civilian honour of Padma Shri in 1981.

== Biography ==
Claire Marie was born on 29 October 1926 in Antwerp, Belgium to Lucie Roebroek and Fernand Evariste Marc Alfred Vellut, an insurance inspector, as the youngest of their six children. She completed her schooling at Institut Saint-André, Ixelles and secured her graduate degree in medicine in 1952 from the Catholic University of Leuven during which period she was involved with the activities of the International Fraternal Association, an organization founded by Vincent Lebbe, a Lazarist priest. She also did an advanced course, Diploma in Tropical Medicine and Hygiene, from the London School of Hygiene and Tropical Medicine and did English language training in 1953. In 1954, she received the offer to work at the Vallabhbhai Patel Chest Institute and Hospital, New Delhi but chose to accept the invitation from Frans Hemerijckx, a Belgian leprologist, to join him in India to open an ambulatory leprosy control project at Polambakkam, a leprosy endemic small village near Kanchipuram in the south Indian state of Tamil Nadu.

== Clinic Under the Trees ==
Claire, along with Frans Hemerijckx, established a Leprosy Centre based at Polambakkam in 1955. The centre, with Vellut and Hemerijckx in the lead, started mobile clinical service called, Clinic under the Trees, a set up where patients were treated in makeshift open clinics set up under the trees. The system carried on for five years till the local government took over the operations with Vellut continuing as its medical officer. She also did a short training course in leprosy at the Calcutta School of Tropical Medicine during this time. Vellut continued with the activities of the trust for 55 years till 2009 and continued her association till her final departure from India in 2012. During her time in Polambakkam, she is reported to have treated over 31000 patients. She was a member of the Damien Foundation in Belgium and in 1992, founded the Indian chapter of the organization under the name, Damien Foundation Trust India. She was also associated with Setukaran Project', an initiative by a group of women led by Kavari, the daughter in law of Frans Hemerijckx, for providing mass education to the rural women, as a co-founder and a member of their governing council.

== Later years ==
Death of a few people close to her in 2008 influenced Vellut to think about returning to Belgium and she spent most of the next three years travelling between Belgium, Mauritius and India. From 2009 onwards, she started engaging herself with the activities of the International Fraternal Association in Brussels by looking after the office duties and routine chores of the organization. She left India for the final time in July 2012.

Claire Vellut, who remained a spinster throughout her life, died on 20 September 2013, at the age of 87, at her room at the premises of the Little Sisters of the Poor in Brussels. Her mortal remains were buried at Banneux cemetery in Brussels. After the death, her friends and relatives shared their memories and testimonies which have been compiled and hosted in a web site, Claire Vellut, as a tribute to the Belgian humanist.

== Awards and honours ==
The Government of India awarded her the civilian honour of Padma Shri in 1981. The Catholic University of Louvain conferred a doctorate (honoris causa) on her in 1989. When the Government of India celebrated the 50th anniversary of Indian independence in 1997, Claire Vellut was one among the 50 women awarded with Stree Ratna honour. Amici di Raoul Follereau (AIFO), an Italian non governmental organization engaged in community-based rehabilitation (CBR) programmes for leprosy and mental disorders, awarded her the Raoul Follereau Award in 1999. She was awarded the Grand Cross of the Order of the Crown by the Royal Court of Belgium in 2009 and she received the Indira Gandhi Award from the International Leaders in Education Program (ILEP) in 2011.

== Award gallery ==
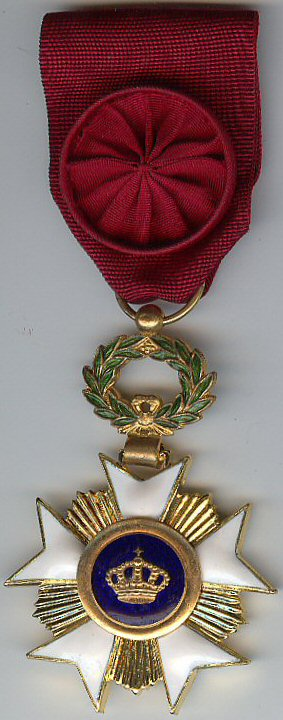
Grand Crosses of the Order of the Crown

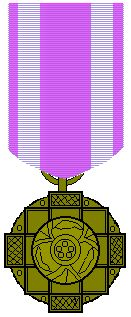
Padma Shri

== See also ==
- Vincent Lebbe
- Father Damien
- Thomas Cochrane (doctor)
- Little Sisters of the Poor
