= Carl Martin Allwood =

Swedish professor (born 1952)

Carl Martin Allwood (born March 23, 1952), is a Swedish professor of Psychology at the University of Gothenburg and author.

== Biography ==
Allwood studied psychology obtained his doctorate at the University of Gothenburg in 1982 with a thesis on the cognitive aspects of statistical problem solving. He has since largely been active in Gothenburg, including as an associate professor of psychology in 1987 and as professor since 2008. In the years 1998–2008 he was professor of psychology at Lund University.

His research is primarily focused on cognitive psychology, social cognitive psychology and culture-oriented psychology. Since the 1980s, he has also studied cognition and information in relation to computers and technological systems in interaction with humans. Other specializations include specialist areas such as:

- Psychology in relation to assessment processes, mainly different forms of metacognition, and decision-making
- The relationship between cognitive styles such as decision-making styles and beliefs about one's own judgment ability and outcomes such as perceived stress in working life
- Forensic psychology, mainly witness psychology
- Research psychology, for example characteristics of creative knowledge environments
- Knowledge anthropology, for example characteristics of and challenges for so-called indigenous psychologies
- Scientific theory, mainly in terms of the problematic and chaotic distinction between qualitative and quantitative research approaches

=== Family ===
Carl Martin Allwood is the son of Martin Allwood and Inga Wilhemsen Allwood, and the brother of Jens Allwood and Kristin Allwood

== Bibliography ==
=== Böcker ===
- Allwood, C.M. & Johnsson, P. (2009). Human encounters across borders. Care and social care in the multicultural society, Liber.
- Allwood C.M. & Erikson, M.G. (2017). Basic scientific theory for psychology and other behavioral sciences, Version 2:a, student literature.
- Allwood, C.M. (2018). The nature and challenges of indigenous psychologies. Psychology and culture. Cambridge Elements series. Cambridge UK: Cambridge University Press.

=== Articles and Chapters ===
- Allwood, C.M. (2018). Approaches to culture-oriented research and teaching. In K.D. Keith (Ed.), Culture across the curriculum: A psychology teacher's handbook (pp. 134–156). Cambridge, UK: Cambridge University Press.
- Hansson, I., Buratti, S. & Allwood, C.M. (2017). Experts’ and novices’ perception of ignorance and knowledge in different research disciplines and its relation to belief in certainty of knowledge. Frontiers of Psychology, 8:377. doi:10.3389/fpsyg.2017.00377
- Buratti, S., & Allwood, C.M. (2018). The effect of knowledge and ignorance assessments on perceived risk. Journal of Risk Research. doi:10.1080/13669877.2018.1459795
- Geisler, M. & Allwood, C.M. (2018). Decision-making competence, social orientation, time style and perceived stress. Frontiers of Psychology, 9: 440. doi:10.3389/fpsyg.2018.00440
- Geisler, M., & Allwood, C. M. (2018). Relating decision-making styles to social orientation and time approach. Journal of Behavioral Decision Making, 31, 415–429. doi:10.1002/bdm.2066
- Karlsson, B.S.A., & Allwood, C.M. (2016). What is the correct answer about the dress’ colors? Investigating the relation between optimism, previous experience, and answerability. Frontiers in Psychology. 7:1808. doi:10.3389/fpsyg.2016.01808
- Allwood, C.M., & Salo, I. (2012). Decision making styles and stress, International Journal of Stress Management, 119, 34–47.
- Allwood, C.M. (2011). On the foundation of the indigenous psychologies, Social Epistemology, 25(1), 3–14. doi:10.1080/02691728.2010.534564
- Allwood, C.M. (2011). The distinction between qualitative and quantitative research methods is problematic. Quality & Quantity, Advance online publication. doi:10.1007/s11135-011-9455-8
- Knutsson, J., Allwood, CM, & Johansson, M. (2011). Child and adult witnesses: The effect of repetition and invitation-probes on free recall and metamemory realism, Metacognition and Learning, 6 (3), 213–228. doi:10.1007/s11409-011-9071-y
- Allwood, C.M. (2011). Knowledge about one’s own ignorance: difficulties, levels and possible effects. In W. Brun, G. Keren, G. Kirkebøen, & H. Montgomery (Eds.), Perspectives on thinking, judging, and decision making (pp. 66– 75). Oslo: Universitetsforlaget. ISBN 978-82-15-01878-2
- Allwood, C.M., & Berry, J.W. With contributions by: C.M. Allwood; J.W. Berry; P. Boski; F.M. Cheung; K.-K. Hwang; H. Kao; U. Kim & Y.-S. Park; L. Marai; F.M. Moghaddam; L.W. Nikora, M. Levy, B. Masters & M. Waitoki; A.B. Nsamenang; E. Protacio-De Castro, M.C. Fabros & R. Kapunan; T.S. Saraswathi; J.B.P. Sinha; K.-S. Yang (2006). Origins and development of indigenous psychologies: An international analysis, International Journal of Psychology, 41, 243–268.
