= 1966 Nobel Peace Prize =

Award

- "to the person (or group) who shall have done the most or the best work for fraternity between nations, for the abolition or reduction of standing armies and for the holding and promotion of peace congresses."
- Location: Oslo, Norway
- Presented by: Norwegian Nobel Committee
- First award: 1901
- Website: Official website

The 1966 Nobel Peace Prize was not awarded because the Norwegian Nobel Committee decided that none of the nominations met the criteria in Nobel's will. Instead, the prize money was allocated with 1/3 to the Main Fund and with 2/3 to the Special Fund of this prize section.

== Deliberations ==
=== Nominations ===
In total, the Norwegian Nobel Committee received 60 nominations for 26 individuals and 7 organizations such as Vinoba Bhave, Grenville Clark, Louis B. Sohn, Danilo Dolci, Trygve Lie, Sarvepalli Radhakrishnan, Paul G. Hoffman, Harry S. Truman, U Thant, the International Planned Parenthood Federation, United Towns Organisation, International Commission of Jurists, World Veterans Federation and the Universal Esperanto Association (UEA). The highest number of nominations – 11 recommendation letters – was for the American statesman Paul G. Hoffman.

Nine of the nominees were newly introduced namely Hideki Yukawa (won the 1949 Nobel Prize in Physics), Jan Tinbergen (won the 1969 Nobel Memorial Prize in Economics), Habib Bourguiba, Joseph Cardijn, Martin Niemöller, Léopold Sédar Senghor (nominated also for Nobel Prize in Literature), Adam Rapacki, Joaquín Sanz Gadea and Sri Kathiresu Ramachandra. Notable figures such as Vincent Auriol, Kees Boeke, Laura Hughes, Frank Nelson, Sutan Sjahrir and Camilo Torres Restrepo died in 1966 without having been nominated.

Official list of nominees and their nominators for the prize
No.	Nominee	Country/ Headquarters	Motivations	Nominator(s)
Individuals
1	Vinoba Bhave (1895–1982)	India	"for his great work for peace in the middle of Asia."	Dominique Pire, O.P. (1910–1969)
2	Habib Bourguiba (1903–2000)	Tunisia	"for his efforts towards a peaceful coexistence between the Arab world and Israel."	Pedro Calmon (1902–1985)
3	Frederick Burdick (?) (prob. Eugene Burdick (1918–1965))	United States	"for devoting a quarter of a century of his life working towards the aims of the will of Alfred Nobel."	William T. Murphy (1899–1978)
3	Frederick Burdick (?) (prob. Eugene Burdick (1918–1965))	United States	"for his outstanding accomplishments for the cause of world peace."	Kenneth J. Gray (1924–2014)
3	Frederick Burdick (?) (prob. Eugene Burdick (1918–1965))	United States	"for devoting a major part of his life to the search of world peace."	Jim Wright (1922–2015)
3	Frederick Burdick (?) (prob. Eugene Burdick (1918–1965))	United States	"for his peace efforts."	Philip J. Philbin (1898–1972)
3	Frederick Burdick (?) (prob. Eugene Burdick (1918–1965))	United States	"for his sincere, tireless and effective effords for the cause of peace."	William J. Randall (1909–2000)
3	Frederick Burdick (?) (prob. Eugene Burdick (1918–1965))	United States	"for his outstanding effort invoking peace of the world."	Arnold Olsen (1916–1990)
4	Joseph Cardijn (1882–1967)	Belgium	"for his great achievements for the cause of peace through the world wide establishment of the movement he founded, the Young Christian Workers, and his untiring quest for universal brotherhood resting on social justice."	Salvino Busuttil (1936–2016)
4	Joseph Cardijn (1882–1967)	Belgium	"in recognition of the world wide extent of work he has carried out, and his great and continuous efforts for peace through the Young Christian Workers movement."	members of the Maltese Parliament
5	Grenville Clark (1882–1967)	United States	"for their efforts to create peace, and their monumental work World Peace through World Law."	Torkell Tande (1901–2001)
6	Louis B. Sohn (1914–2006)	Austria; United States	"for their efforts to create peace, and their monumental work World Peace through World Law."	Torkell Tande (1901–2001)
7	Danilo Dolci (1924–1997)	Italy	No motivation included.	members of the Swedish Parliament
8	Guido Guida (1897–1969)	Italy	No motivation included.	members of the Italian Parliament
9	Paul G. Hoffman (1891–1974)	United States	"for his unceasing work for world peace and progress through a variety of endeavors, ranging from economic growth to education."	Henry S. Rouss (?)
9	Paul G. Hoffman (1891–1974)	United States	"for the depth and continuity of his personal commitment to peace."	Milton Katz (1907–1995)
9	Paul G. Hoffman (1891–1974)	United States	No motivation included.	Maurine Neuberger (1907–2000)
9	Paul G. Hoffman (1891–1974)	United States	"for working devotedly and effectively for the improvement of world conditions and world understanding, and towards the objective of world peace."	Erwin Griswold (1904–1994)
9	Paul G. Hoffman (1891–1974)	United States	"for his work and concern directed towards the establishment of conditions throughout the world, especially in those countries seeking economic independence and development, in which peaceful relationships could be fostered."	John Sherman Cooper (1901–1991)
9	Paul G. Hoffman (1891–1974)	United States	"for his distinctive and distinguished record of social responsibility, and his devoted and effective labor to strengthen the foundation for international understanding and world peace."	Lester B. Pearson (1897–1972)
9	Paul G. Hoffman (1891–1974)	United States	"for his extraordinary service to the cause of peaceful social and economic evolution."	Paul Douglas (1892–1976)
9	Paul G. Hoffman (1891–1974)	United States	"for his constructive efforts to build stability, prosperity and peace in troubled areas of the world."	Arthur Larson (1910–1993)
9	Paul G. Hoffman (1891–1974)	United States	"for his devotion to the concept of peace and progress, and the mutual advancement of mankind through mutual understanding and help."	Hubert Humphrey (1911–1978)
9	Paul G. Hoffman (1891–1974)	United States	"for his contributions to the causes of humanity and peace."	J. William Fulbright (1905–1995)
9	Paul G. Hoffman (1891–1974)	United States	"for his long service to the cause of peace through assistance to the less fortunate among men and nations."	Arthur Goldberg (1908–1990)
10	Marc Joux (?)	France	" for his writings in a pacifist manner in accordance with Nobelian thinking."	Auguste Billiemaz (1903–1983)
11	Frank Laubach (1884–1970)	United States	"for his great humanitarian work, his untiring efforts to free millions from illiteracy, and his dedication to the elimination of hunger and poverty in the world."	Clair A. Callan (1920–2005)
12	Trygve Lie	Norway	"for his great contribution to the establishment of the United Nations."	3 members of the Norwegian Storting
13	Martin Niemöller (1892–1984)	Germany	No motivation included.	Christel Rüppel (1936–2016)
14	Sarvepalli Radhakrishnan (1888–1975)	India	"for devoting his whole life and teachings to the principles of coexistence, especially between Europe and Asia."	Christopher Hill (1912–2003)
15	Kathiresu Ramachandra (1895–1976)	Sri Lanka	"for his dedication to the Mission of Peace in the world."	Alick Aluwihare (1926–2009)
16	Adam Rapacki (1909–1970)	Poland	"for his work to create a nuclear weapons free zone in central Europe."	professors from University of Warsaw
16	Adam Rapacki (1909–1970)	Poland	"for his great merits in the cause for peace."	professors from Jagiellonian University
17	Joaquín Sanz Gadea (1930–2019)	Spain	"for his humanitarian activities as a doctor in contributing to the peace in Stanleyville, without thinking of politics, race or religion."	José Camón Aznar (1898–1979)
18	Léopold Sédar Senghor (1906–2001)	Senegal	"for his efforts to bring people together in friendship and cultural understanding."	Nicolas Grunitzky (1913–1969)
18	Léopold Sédar Senghor (1906–2001)	Senegal	No motivation included.	Moktar Ould Daddah (1924–2003)
19	U Thant (1909–1974)	Burma	"for his efforts to create the conditions that are necessary for negotiation, which in their turn could lead to peace and relieve tension in the world."	4 members of the Norwegian Storting
20	Jan Tinbergen (1903–1994)	Netherlands	No motivation included.	professors of Leiden University
21	Harry S. Truman (1884–1972)	United States	"for his efforts to promote brotherhood of nations, and establish international associations to achieve a lasting peace."	Edward V. Long (1908–1972)
22	Östen Undén (1886–1974)	Sweden	"for his effort to create an international legal system, and his devoted work for peace."	members of the Swedish Parliament
23	Fritz von Unruh (1885–1970)	Germany	No motivation included.	Werner Schmid (1919–2005)
23	Fritz von Unruh (1885–1970)	Germany	No motivation included.	Erik Blumenfeld (1915–1997)
24	Abraham Vereide (1886–1969)	United States	"for creating a Christian parayer and action Group, which focuses on the elimination of war from society and creating world -brotherhood and interracial fraternity."	Frank Carlson (1893–1987)
25	Shigeru Yoshida (1878–1967)	Japan	"for his efforts to prevent the Pacific War, and for his efforts to bring restoration of peace."	Kisaburo Yokota (1896–1993)
26	Hideki Yukawa (1907–1981)	Japan	No motivation included.	Selhataro Salsadia (?)
26	Hideki Yukawa (1907–1981)	Japan	No motivation included.	Hideo Kaneko (1934–2013)
Organizations
27	International Commission of Jurists (ICJ) (founded in 1952)	Geneva	No motivation included.	Edvard Hambro (1911–1977)
28	International Planned Parenthood Federation (IPPF) (founded in 1952)	London	"for its contributions to world peace and a better world through family planning."	3 members of the Swedish Parliament
29	International Union for Land Value Taxation and Free Trade (The IU) (founded in 1926)	London	No motivation included.	Johan Møller Warmedal (1914–1988)
30	United Towns Organisation (UTO)	Barcelona	"for linking towns and peoples through activities based on brotherhood, non-discrimination, and tolerance, and thereby transcending ideological and racial barriers."	Lance Mallalieu (1905–1979)
30	United Towns Organisation (UTO)	Barcelona	"for its work for reconciliation, understanding, and durable friendship between all the peoples of the world."	André Davoust (1922–2010)
30	United Towns Organisation (UTO)	Barcelona	"for its work for reconciliation, understanding, and durable friendship between all the peoples of the world."	Léon Noël (1888–1987)
30	United Towns Organisation (UTO)	Barcelona	"for its work for reconciliation, understanding, and durable friendship between all the peoples of the world."	Lucien Neuwirth (1924–2013)
30	United Towns Organisation (UTO)	Barcelona	"for bringing people together trough town twinning in a most valuable way."	Julian Ridsdale (1915–2004)
31	Universal Esperanto Association (UEA) (founded in 1908)	Rotterdam	"for their efforts to create international understanding and world peace."	members of the Swedish Parliament
31	Universal Esperanto Association (UEA) (founded in 1908)	Rotterdam	"for their outstanding activity on behalf of international understanding and world peace."	Clifford Kenyon (1896–1979)
31	Universal Esperanto Association (UEA) (founded in 1908)	Rotterdam	"for their remarkable contributions to the establishment of world peace."	members of the Norwegian Storting
32	Women's International League for Peace and Freedom (WILPF) (founded in 1915)	Geneva	"for its sustained and intelligent work to establish the conditions of peace."	John Herman Randall Jr. (1899–1980)
32	Women's International League for Peace and Freedom (WILPF) (founded in 1915)	Geneva	No motivation included.	Marie Lous Mohr (1892–1973)
33	World Veterans Federation (WVF) (founded in 1876)	Geneva	"for their devotion to the search for peace and their efforts towards disarmament."	Philip Noel-Baker (1889–1982)

== Norwegian Nobel Committee ==
The following members of the Norwegian Nobel Committee appointed by the Storting were responsible for the selection of the 1966 Nobel laureate in accordance with the will of Alfred Nobel:

1964 Norwegian Nobel Committee
Picture	Name	Position	Political Party	Other posts
	Gunnar Jahn (1883–1971)	Chairman	Liberal	former Governor, Norges Bank (1946–1954) former, Minister of Finance (1934–35, 1945)
	Gustav Natvig-Pedersen (Note: "When Natvig Pedersen died in 1965, he was replaced by deputy member Helge Refsum.") (1893–1965)	Member	Labour	former President of the Storting (1949–1954)
	Aase Lionæs (1907–1999)	Member	Labour	Vice President of the Lagting (1965–1973)
	Nils Langhelle (1907–1967)	Member	Labour	former Minister of Defence (1952–1954); President of the Storting (1958–1965)
	John Lyng (Note: "Erling Wikborg served as a deputy for Lyng when the latter became Foreign Minister in 1965.") (1905–1978)	Member	Conservative	24th Prime Minister of Norway (1963)
	Helge Refsum (1897–1976)	Member	Centre	former Judge at the Gulating Court (1922–1949)
	Erling Wikborg (1894–1992)	Member	Christian People	former Leader of the Christian Democratic Party (1951–1955)
