= Frans Hemerijckx =

Flemish leprologist and humanist

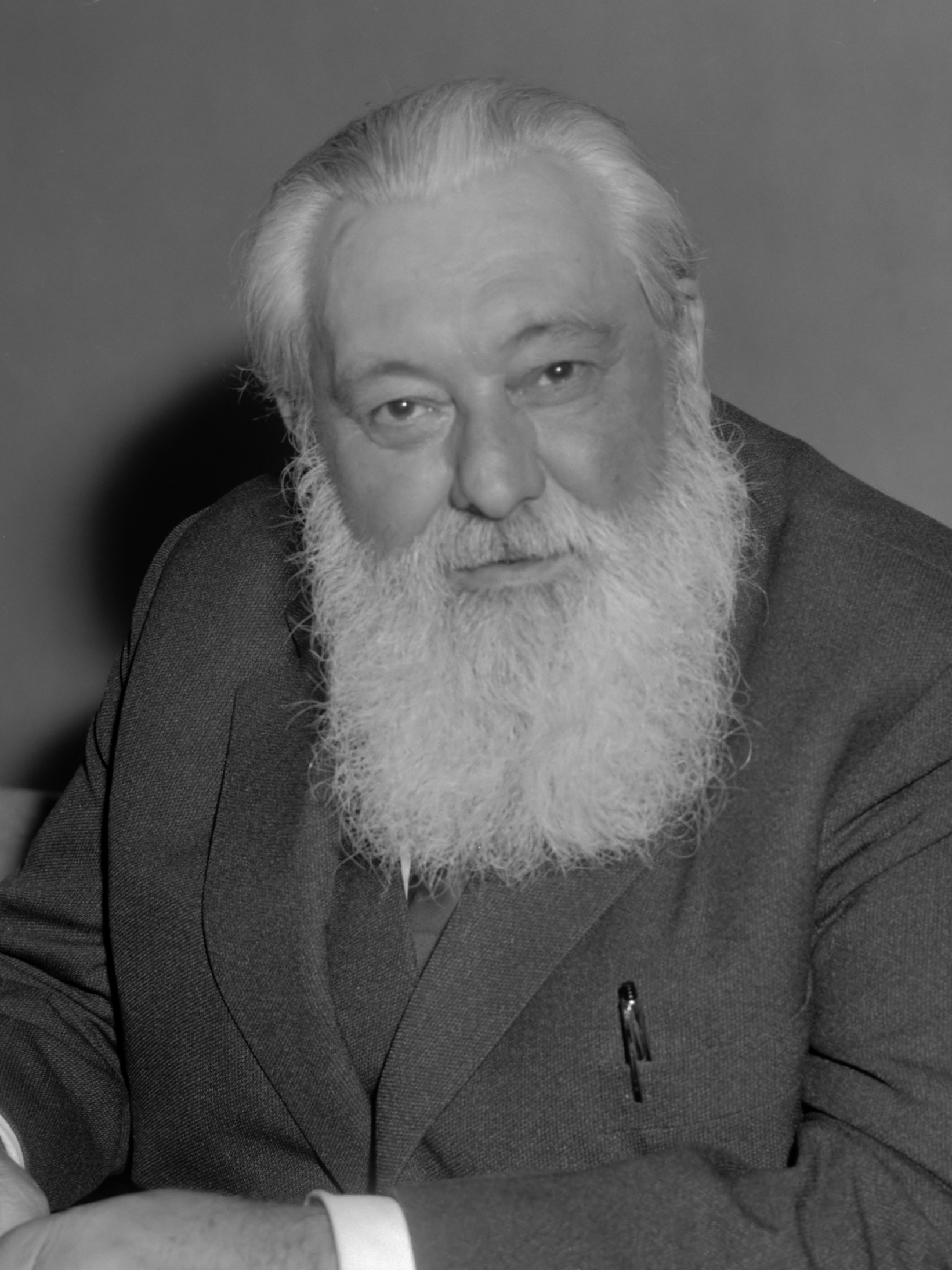
- Frans Hemerijckx (1964)
- Born: 18 August 1902; Ninove, Flemish Region, Belgium
- Died: 14 October 1969 (aged 67); Leuven, Belgium
- Occupations: Leprologist, social worker
- Known for: Damien Foundation India Trust
- Parent(s): Theofiel Hemerijckx; Leonie Steenhoudt
- Awards: Padma Shri

Frans Hemerijckx (1902–1969) was a Flemish leprologist, humanist and the founder of the Damien Foundation in Belgium, a non profit non governmental organization engaged in providing treatment and rehabilitation services to people afflicted with leprosy. He spent most of his life in the treatment and rehabilitation of leprosy patients and initiated a mobile leprosy treatment methodology, Clinic under the trees. On 13 September 1975, Government of Belgium honoured Hemerijckx by issuing a commemorative stamp, depicting his image. (9615) Hemerijckx, a Main-belt comet discovered in 1993 by Eric Walter Elst is named after the Flemish doctor.

== Biography ==
Frans Hemerijckx was born on 18 August 1902 at Ninove in the Flemish province of Belgium to Leonie Steenhoudt and Theofiel Hemerijckx, a candle manufacturer, as the eldest of their four children. He did his early education at St. Catherine's College, Geraardsbergen and secured a medical degree from the Catholic University of Leuven after which he specialized in tropical medicine at Brussels. His career started in 1929 when he was sent to Kasai, a leprosy endemic region in Belgian Congo (present day Democratic Republic of the Congo). Reaching there with his fiancé, Hemerijckx opened a Leprosy Centre in Tshumbe where patients could live with their families as the first step of rehabilitating them. He started an ambulatory service in the region for wider coverage and started using the then newly discovered sulpha drugs such as Dapsone and also opened another leprosy centre at Dikungu. He stayed in Congo for 25 years and by the time he returned to Belgium, the centre he had founded at Tshumbe had grown to be largest in the country.

== Service in India ==
Hemerijckx, while on a holiday in Belgium in 1954, had an audience with King Leopold III who informed him of the newly opened Belgian Leprosy Centre in India which was in need of a leprosy specialist. He accepted the offer and persuaded Claire Vellut, another Belgian physician, to accompany him to India where the duo established a leprosy centre at Polambakkam, a small village with high concentration of leprosy patients, near Kancheepuram in the south Indian state of Tamil Nadu on 9 July 1955. There they started an ambulatory service, which later came to be known as Clinic under the trees, a mobile medical service where the treatment was dispensed from makeshift camps set up under the trees. Hemerijckx carried on with the mobile service for five years till the local government took over the system in 1960, placing it under Claire Vellut. In 1961, he was associated with the World Health Organization and prepared several reports on leprosy for the organization, the notable among them is a series, Leprosy problem in India, a detailed study on the disease covering several states of India.

In 1964, when Fr. Obbels and Jacques Vellut started the forum, Friends of Father Damien, Hemerijckx joined forces to found the Damien Foundation, now renamed as Action Damien. He remains as one of the inspirations behind the foundation whose activities soon spread across the world and Claire Vellut founded the Damien Foundation Trust India in 1992. In 1965, he returned from India and settled at his native place in Grimbergen but continued his associations with the Indian and Congo operations. By 1967, his health failed and he underwent an oesophagus surgery in Paris. When the leprosy centre in Polambakkam was renamed as Hemerijckx Government Leprosy Centre, he could not attend the function due to ill health. He died on 14 October 1969, at the age of 67, at Leuven, Belgium.

== Personal life ==
Hemerijckx's first marriage was in Belgian Congo during his first trip to that country but it was short lived; his wife died during pregnancy while they were settling in the country. He married again and the couple had five children. One of his sons, Shilanand Hemraj, is a theologist and writer.

== See also ==
- Father Damien
- Thomas Cochrane (doctor)
- Claire Vellut
