= Action Damien =

Action Damien (in French) or Damiaanactie (in Dutch) is a national Belgian NGO, founded in 1964 under the name Les amis du père Damien ("Friends of Father Damien"). At its first founding, people and groups in Belgium were organizing the "World Leprosy Day", created by Raoul Follereau. The organization would later be called Fondation Damien, before taking its current names in January 2008. Pluralist and non-denominational, Action Damien / Damiaanactie is now active in 13 countries in the world. Thanks to its 1,200 local workers (for about ten expatriates), the organization detects and treats 250 000 people sick with leprosy, tuberculosis, and leishmaniasis every year.

Every year in Belgium, with the help of hundreds or even thousands of volunteers, Action Damien / Damiaanactie organizes an awareness and fund-raising campaign during the last weekend of January. The donations, received throughout the year, cover more than half of its expenses. Action Damien / Damiaanactie works within the framework of the International Federation of Anti-Leprosy Associations (ILEP) (Action Damien contributed to its foundation). Action Damien / Damiaanactie always works at the request of local authorities.

== Inspiration ==
Action Damien draws its inspiration from three influential people in the field of leprosy.

1. Raoul Follereau (the "Advocate of the Lepers") was a journalist, a philosopher, a lawyer and a writer who spent most of his life speaking out on behalf of all those with leprosy. He initiated World Leprosy Day.
2. Frans Hemerijckx (the "Doctor of the Lepers") was a Belgian doctor, specialized in leprosy, who invented the concept of a "Clinic under the trees" (rather than isolate those with leprosy from their loved ones, it was better to treat them within their communities).
3. Father Damien (the "Apostle of the Lepers"), is, without doubt, the first person to have seen the human being alongside the sick one, during his life at Molokai.
