= Martin Allwood =

Swedish language educator, writer, sociologist, translator

Martin Samuel Allwood by Igor Pańczuk

Martin Samuel Allwood (13 April 1916 – 16 January 1999) was a Swedish language educator, writer, sociologist, translator and professor. He was the father of professors Jens Allwood and Carl Martin Allwood.

== Biography ==
Martin Allwood came from an international background, something which came full circle to characterize his cosmopolite's life.

He was born in Jönköping, the only child of the English school activist Charles Allwood, who, in his extracurricular activities at the School Board as its consultant in English, dabbled into radio, and went on to become a radio teaching pioneer at the then fledgling AB Radiotjänst. Allwood's mother was of nobility: the Finnish-Swedish Baroness Aina, née Åkerhielm.

=== Academic and international activities ===
After passing his university entrance exam in Jönköping in 1935, he studied at Cambridge from 1935 to 1939 with a double Bachelor of Arts in psychology (experimental psychology and social psychology) and British literature. Among his teachers were T.S. Eliot and I.A. Richards.

During the early 1940s, his book Läsare bedömer litteratur (English: Readers judge literature) was the first to introduce I. A. Richards' "new criticism" into literary studies in Sweden. During the same period, he was developing new methods for language teaching at the school, Marston Hill, founded by his father, Charles Allwood, in Mullsjö, Sweden. He published the book Levande språkundervisning (Living language teaching), where he collected contemporary educational expertise and introduced new methods which were important for language teaching in Sweden.

In 1939–40 he made a year-long study trip to India, which led him to translate and introduce a number of Indian poets to Sweden. Allwood's translations included the Bangladeshi national anthem as well as other poems by Tagore.

In 1942–1945 he worked as an English teacher at Göteborgs högskola and debated teaching as editor of the educational renewal anthologies Levande språkundervisning (1942), Universiteten i en ny värld (1944), and Det unga Göteborg 1944 (1944). Together with Keith Laycock, he published An English Anthology (1942). Allwood was, in collaboration with Inga-Britt Ranemark and even couple Gunnar and Alva Myrdal, the first in Sweden to make a sociological-anthropological study of a whole society with the book Medelby (1943). After World War II, he studied at Columbia University attaining a Master of Arts in 1949 and at the Technische Universität Darmstadt, where he graduated in 1953 with his sociological dissertation on worker population in the bombed German city of Darmstadt.

Starting in the late 1940s, he served as a professor of sociology and literature at several American universities until he was diagnosed with cancer in 1967 and he returned to Sweden. His six-year battle to overcome the disease is described in I Carried Death in my Body (1976) – a serious criticism of the health care system's shortcomings – which was translated into 13 languages.

== Other accomplishments, translation of Nordic poetry ==
Martin Allwood founded the Authors' Society of Gothenburg and the Authors' Society of Sweden (1974).

Allwood and his family left a legacy to his lifelong passion which was to cross-pollinate American and Swedish students with each other's language. He contributed to the development of Marston Hill, the Anglo-American Center and the English-American boarding school in Mullsjö, Västergötland. The school was founded in 1924 by Charles Allwood who emigrated to Sweden from Warwickshire. He was the assistant to the National Swedish Board of Education (Skolöverstyrelsen) for English in Swedish schools.

He was a productive author in Swedish and English (as well as several minor publications in German and French), and has had works translated into several other languages. Allwood was also a productive translator. He translated Scandinavian poetry to English, in particular Swedish and Norwegian. Among his publications is the canonical Modern Scandinavian Poetry 1900–1980, which was published 1982, and still functions as a standard reference in the United States.

=== Sample translation ===
Here is a sample of Martin Samuel Allwood's translation of the poet Gunvor Hofmo's poem "Illusion":

Alt jeg bad om, det er også skjedd, All I asked for has been granted me –
og hjertet – men jeg er bare redd! Yet I am scared, although my heart is free.

Mitt hjerte jager flyktende avsted My heart is racing from me, and the flight
og eier ingenting å bremse med Knows no restraint, no check to hold it tight

som tvinger det å slå mot livet vendt And force is throbbing urge toward living things,
der tørst og ømhet skulle strenger spent Where thirst and tenderness should stretch the strings.

Frihet! Ja, umenneskelig og stor Freedom! Yes, inhuman, great. We know
som ikke rummer liv, der intet gror It has no life, and nothing wants to grow.

der kulden dreper så min sjel blir stum Its coldness kills, my soul to silence falls
og døden roper gjennom fjerne rum. And death is crying through the distant halls.

— Gunvor Hofmo, translated by Martin S. Allwood, Illusion

== Works ==
- Modern Scandinavian poetry
- Scandinavian songs and ballads: Modern Swedish, Danish and Norwegian songs
- Jag minns det vackra Mullsjö : 230 konstnärer och en ort i deras liv
- Basic Swedish Word List
- 20th Century Scandinavian Poetry: The Development of Poetry in Iceland
- Katedralernas kyrkogård : fria dikter
- Engelska vokabler och idiom med viktigare amerikanska varianter
- Den västerländska civilisationens rötter : en läsebok för dem som
- Livets träd : sex, kärlek och personligheten i det samtida medvetandet
- Essays: On contemporary civilization
- More snapshots of more or less famous people
- English and American songs
- Bildande konst : dikter = Liberal arts : poems
- Splittring och enhet : dikter
- Amerika-Svensk Lyrik genom 100 ar
- Ryska kulturmönster : kulturmönster, sexualitet och personlighet
- Odelbar värld : dikter
- Love Must Speak
- Automaten blöder : noveller
- A new English anthology : with biographical notes in English
- Valda svenska dikter. D. 2, 1965–1986
- Indien : en kort framställning av land, folk, näringsliv
- Läsare bedömer litteratur

== Personal life ==
Allwood was married seven times — most recently to the Colombian-born artist and potter Enelia Paz Gómez.
