= Isaac Lewin =

Polish-American professor (1906–1995)

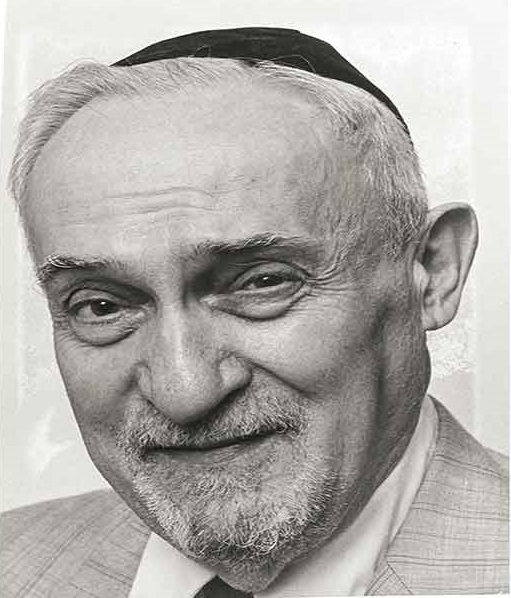
Isaac Lewin

Rabbi Dr. Isaac Lewin (1906 – 1995) was a professor emeritus of Jewish history at the Bernard Revel graduate school of Yeshiva University in New York.

== Biography ==
Isaac Lewin, born in 1906, in Wieliczka, Poland was the son of Rabbi Aaron Lewin. He received rabbinic ordination in 1935, and a law degree in 1937, and served two terms on the City Council of Łódź. He fled Poland just ahead of the Nazis in 1939 with his wife and young son Nathan, and arrived in the United States in 1941. He was part of the Vaad Ha-Hatzala working for the Rescuing Jews in Occupied Poland. After the war he went on a relief mission to help Holocaust survivors and displaced persons. Lewin was a key aide to the leaders of Agudath Yisrael, and became the spokesman for the Agudath Israel in the United Nations.

Lewin an architect of the Declaration on the Elimination of All Forms of Intolerance and of Discrimination Based on Religion or Belief, which was Proclaimed by General Assembly resolution 36/55 of 25 November 1981. For this, he was awarded the United Nations' Medal of Peace. He was also awarded by the city of Warsaw with the Golden Badge of Merit in 1988, for promoting international relations and cooperation among peoples.

Rabbi Lewin was professor of Jewish history at the Yeshiva University. He taught at YU from 1944 until 1985. He was an author and editor of works in English, Hebrew, Yiddish, and he could converse comfortably in German and French.

In 1983 he was involved in obtaining an agreement from the Polish Government to help restore the neglected Jewish cemeteries in Poland. His Son Nathan Lewin is a prominent Washington attorney who has appeared before the Supreme Court in many Orthodox causes.

== Writings ==
In the struggle against discrimination -1957-

Late Summer Fruit -1960-

War on War -1969-

The Jewish community in Poland -1985-

In defense of Human Rights -1992-

Towards international guarantees for Religious Liberty -1981-

Ten years of Hope -1971-

Religious Freedom -1946- By Isaac Lewin, Michael L. Munk, Jeremiah Joseph Berman

Unto the Mountains -1975-

Attempts at Rescuing European Jews with the Help of Polish Diplomatic Missions During World War II -1977-

Ten years of Hope: addresses before the United Nations -1971-

Religious Jewry and the United Nations -1953–

In defense of Shehitah -1958-

Shall the sword devour forever? -1974-

The Metabolic Effects of the Steroid Hormones -1950–

The Effect of Reward on the Experience of Pain -1965–

A comparative study of concept formation -1981– By Helen Strauss, Isaac Lewin

The Protection of Jewish Religious Rights by Royal Edicts in Ancient Poland -1943–

Review and Analysis of Proposals for Federal Humane Slaughtering Legislation -1957– By Leo Pfeffer, Isaac Lewin, Synagogue Council of America

Lewin, Isaac; Gelber, Nathan Michael (1990). A History of Polish Jewry during the revival of Poland. Shengold Publishers. ISBN 9780884001430.
