= Fouad Ammoun =

Lebanese jurist

Fouad Ammoun (Arabic: فؤاد عمون; 25 November 1899, Deir al-Qamar – 11 February 1977, Beirut) was a Lebanese lawyer and diplomat. He served as judge of the International Court of Justice between 1965 and 1976. He was vice-president of the Court between 1970 and 1976.

He was one of the drafters of the Covenant of the Arab League.

He was awarded the Order of Merit of the Federal Republic of Germany in 1960.
