= Milton Katz =

American jurist (1907–1995)

Milton Katz (November 29, 1907 – August 29, 1995) was an American jurist born in Brooklyn, New York. He was a professor at Harvard Law School and senior administrator of the Marshall Plan from 1948 to 1951.

== Career ==
After graduating from Harvard College, Katz studied at Harvard Law School, where he was on the editorial board of the Harvard Law Review. He briefly worked in the Judiciary. In the 1930s, he was a lawyer in several New Deal temporary agencies. In 1939, he was appointed as a professor at Harvard Law School. With the outbreak of World War II, Katz joined the War Production Board and was later transferred to the Office of Strategic Services in 1944. In addition, from 1944 to 1946, he served in the U.S. Marine Corps.

After the war, in 1948, he was appointed Deputy Chairman of the Commission for European Recovery, later known as the Marshall Plan, under Averell Harriman. From 1950 to 1951, he himself served as Special Representative for the Marshall Plan with the rank of ambassador. After overseeing the distribution of $12 billion in aid funds for post-war Europe for nearly two years and coordinating among 18 participating countries, he had acquired such a reputation that he continued to be responsible for international projects. He later served as Chairman of the Finance and Economic Committee of NATO.

Katz was a member of the executive committee of the World Peace Foundation and from 1970-1978 he was Chairman of the Carnegie Endowment for International Peace. He served as the President of the American Academy of Arts and Sciences from 1979 to 1982, to which he had been elected in 1954.

At Harvard Law School he established the program in International Legal Studies, which he headed 1954 to 1974. After his retirement from the Henry L. Stimson Professorship (1954–1978) at Harvard, he became a Distinguished Professor of Law at Suffolk University from 1978 until his death in 1995.

In 1933, Katz married Vivian Greenberg, with whom he had three sons.

== Bibliography ==
- "The Consent Decree in Antitrust Administration" Harvard Law Review, Vol. 53, Issue 3 (January 1940), pp. 415–447
- Cases and Material on Administrative Law American Casebook Series.. St. Paul: West Publishing Co. 1947. Pp. xiii, 1108.
- "International Legal Studies: A New Vista for the Legal Profession" American Bar Association Journal, Vol. 42, Issue 1 (January 1956), pp. 53–92
- The Law of International Transactions and Relations: Cases and Materials, (The Foundation Press, 1960), with Kingman Brewster.
- The Things that are Caesar's (Knopf, 1966), called a "subtle, acute and stimulating work" by Arthur M. Schlesinger Jr. in Harvard Law Review (January, 1968).
- "The Cold War and the Peaceful Settlement of Disputes: The Relevance of International Adjudication" Duquesne University Law Review, Vol. 6, Issue 2 (1967-1968), pp. 95–114
- The Relevance of International Adjudication (Harvard University Press, 1958)
- "The Marshall Plan in American Foreign Policy: An Evaluation for the Present" Suffolk Transnational Law Review (Fall 1990 14(1):61-80.
