= Britta Holmström =

Swedish politician

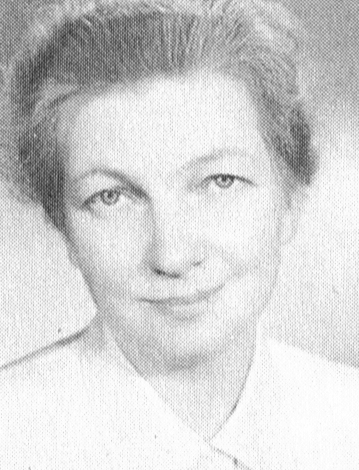
Britta Holmström

Britta Holmström née Ringius (8 April 1911 – 4 October 1992) was a Swedish philanthropist, aid worker and politician. She is remembered for organizing and providing humanitarian assistance for refugees, initially for Czechoslovak Jews in 1938. In May 1944, her efforts led to the founding of Inomeuropeisk Mission (IM) to further the work of assisting and saving refugees. She chaired the organization from 1947 and helped create centres in Sweden to house hundreds of refugees, including many from Nazi concentration camps. IM's activities were later extended to other parts of the world when it became known as Individuell Människohjälp (Individual Humanitarian Help). Holmström received several significant awards for her work and was put forward more than once as a candidate for the Nobel Peace Prize.

== Early life, education and family ==
Born in Sävsjö, southern Sweden, on 8 April 1911, Britta Ringius was the daughter of the timber merchant Erik Johan (John) Ringius and his wife Alma Sofia née Thunander who was active in the Red Cross. The family's first child, she had a sister Inga. Brought up in a Christian household, she attended the Sävsjö elementary school, the girls' school in Jönköping and Lindebergska skolan, the girls' high school in Lund, where she matriculated. She completed her education at Lund University where she graduated in economics, philosophy and history of religion. While in Lund, she married the theology lecturer Folke Holmström in May 1935. The couple had six children.

== Career ==
In 1937, Holmström travelled with her husband to Germany where he lectured on behalf of the Nordic Lutheran Academy. She was shocked at how people were suffering under the hardships of Nazi Germany. An article she wrote about her experiences published in Ny kyrklig tidskrift was considered so controversial that her husband lost his job at the university. As a result, the family moved to Linköping where he became a teacher at the Cathedral School. While in Linköping, Britta Holmström founded Linköpings ungdoms- och hemgårdar, an organization for the benefit of the city's unemployed young people.

Concerned about the worsening situation in Czechoslovakia following the German occupation of Sudetenland in 1938, Holmström had a vision which incited her to encourage friends and students in Lund and Scania to collect money to help Jewish refugees. She and her husband travelled to Prague where they spent a week distributing the funds before returning to Lund to continue their work. In collaboration with the Czech YMCA, they paid for five secretaries to help with supporting women's camps there. Their initiative became known as Praghjälpen (Prague Aid).

As the whole of Czechoslovakia was soon occupied and could no longer be visited, help was extended to the rest of Europe, including the Jews in Vienna and those who had become refugees in Sweden. By 1939, the organization had become known as Inomeuropeisk Mission (Intra-European Mission, IM) but it was not officially constituted until a conference was held in Linköping on 29 May 1944. It was initially chaired by Bishop Torsten Ysander with Holmström as vice chair but she headed the organization herself from 1947.

After the war ended in 1945, IM focused on help for Poland, Germany, Austria and France. In collaboration with Folke Bernadotte who headed the Swedish Red Cross, help centres were established in Sweden for refugees of all origins and beliefs. Hundreds of former concentration camp interns were welcomed to the IM Home (Vrigstadhemmet) in Småland. Stands Manor House in Jönköping, first used as a recreation centre for German and central European children, was used to house girl refugees from Tibet in 1963.

In the early 1950s, Holmström was a member of the Riksdag for a short period, representing the Liberals. In 1954, together with her husband she returned to Lund. She continued to be a leading member of IM as it expanded across Europe, the Middle East, southern Asia, Africa and Latin America. As interest was extended to Tibet, the Dalai Lama visited her in Lund on several occasions in the 1960s.

Britta Holmström died in Lund on 4 October 1992.

== Awards ==
Britta Holmström was widely honoured for her work. In 1950, she received the Academy Prize from the weekly magazine Svensk Damtidning for her humanitarian accomplishments. She was given an honorary doctorate of medicine by Lund University in 1961. This was followed in 1954 by the Order of Merit of the Federal Republic of Germany, with the Commanders Cross distinction, and in 1960 by the Swedish Order of Vasa. In 1973, Holmström became one of the few women to receive Sweden's Order of the Seraphim. The Benemerenti medal was awarded to her personally by the Pope in 1977.

On several occasions, Britta Holmström was put forward as a candidate for the Nobel Peace Prize.
