= Helene Stähelin =

Swiss mathematician, teacher and peace activist (1891-1970)

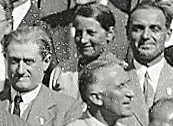
Left to right: Alfred Rosenblatt, Helene Stähelin (in background), Angelo Tonolo, and J. Züllig, at the International Congress of Mathematicians, Zürich 1932

Helene Stähelin (18 July 1891 – 30 December 1970) was a Swiss mathematician, teacher, and peace activist. From 1948 to 1967, she was president of the Swiss section of the Women's International League for Peace and Freedom and its representative in the Swiss Peace Council.

== Life ==
Born in Wintersingen, Stähelin was one of twelve children of the parson Gustav Stähelin (1858–1934) and his wife Luise (née Lieb). In 1894, the family moved from Wintersingen to Allschwil. Stähelin attended the Töchterschule in Basel, the University of Basel, and the University of Göttingen.

In 1922, she became teacher of mathematics and natural sciences at the Töchterinstitut in Ftan. In 1924, she obtained her DPhil from Basel University. Her dissertation was advised by Hans Mohrmann and Otto Spiess. In 1926, she became a member of the Swiss Mathematical Society. Between 1934 and 1956, Stähelin worked as teacher at the Protestant secondary school in Zug. After her pensioning she returned to Basel, where she assisted for several years in Otto Spiess' editing of the Bernoulli family letters.

Being a pacifist, Stähelin committed herself to the Women's International League for Peace and Freedom (IFFF) and its struggle against scientific warfare. She was president of the IFFF's Swiss section from 1947–1967, during which the main issues were the United Nations, nuclear weapons, and the Vietnam War. Due to her peace activism, she was watched by Swiss authorities in the mid 1950s; her file at the Swiss Public Prosecutor General was kept secret until 1986. Stähelin advocated for women's suffrage in Switzerland, though she died before women were able to vote. She died in Basel.

== See also ==
- List of peace activists
