= Institut Saint-André =

School in Brussels, Belgium

Location
- 216-220 Chaussée de Boondael - 180 Avenue de l'Hippodrome; Brussels, 1050; Belgium
- Coordinates: 50.819444°N 4.378542°E

Information
- School type: Independent mixed primary and secondary
- Religious affiliation: Christian
- Denomination: Catholic
- Established: 1906
- Campus type: City
- Website: www.isaxl.be/wordpress/

Institut Saint-André is a French speaking Catholic free school ("ecole libre" - a subsidized state school in Belgium), situated in Ixelles, Brussels, Belgium. Commonly called "Saint-André" by students, it is composed of two campuses. The primary and "maternelle" (preschool) share a site on Chaussée de Boondael, while the secondary school is found on the nearby Avenue de l'Hippodrome. The school follows the general curriculum, which includes French, Mathematics, Dutch, Science, History, Geography, Latin, Greek, Economics and Gymnastics. From the third year of secondary school, Saint-André offers elective courses, with a choice between Latin, Greek, Science, English and Economics. On the third degree, all elective and general curriculum subjects together must make up 28 to 34 hours of tuition a week. The school was founded in 1906 as a boarding school for girls. It is now a mixed school, open to applications from boys and girls. The immersion in Dutch is organized since 2003 (first school in Brussels).
