= Thomas Cochrane (doctor) =

Scottish medical missionary

Thomas Cochrane M.B. C.M (1866–1953) was a Scottish medical missionary. He is notable for founding the first school to teach western medicine to Chinese trainee doctors, and for his influential London-based campaigns to promote missionary work.

== Early life ==
Cochrane was brought up in Greenock, Scotland. In 1882, he was inspired to become a missionary after listening to the evangelical preacher Dwight L. Moody. He trained to be a doctor at the University of Glasgow, and in 1897 traveled to China with the London Missionary Society.

== Work in China ==
Cochrane arrived in Chaoyang hospital, Mongolia when the country was in the throes of the Boxer Rebellion. Braving threats from bandits, he traveled from village to village in an ox cart dispensing medical aid. Mr and Mrs Liddell, the parents of the famous runner Eric Liddell the famous, were also there at the time. In 1900, he moved to Beijing to restore the hospital which had been almost totally demolished. Cochrane succeeded in obtaining royal support for his work after he healed the Empress Dowager Cixi's chief eunuch and her chief lady-in-waiting. He decided to establish the hospital as a training hospital so as to educate Chinese doctors in the western style of medicine. With the support of the Empress and other missionary bodies he founded the Peking Union Medical College. To support the students at the College, Cochrane translated in to Mandarin western medical books such as Heath’s Anatomy (1909) and Heath’s Osteology (1910). In 1916, the hospital was transferred to the Rockefeller Institute.

== Campaigns to promote missionary work ==
Cochrane believed that missionary work should be co-ordinated, organised and well supplied. In 1913, the Christian Literature Society of China published his Survey of the Missionary Occupation of China with an accompanying atlas showing missionary activities in the provinces of China. The work called for trained personnel, medical equipment, and supplies. After he returned to England in 1915, he continued to encourage the gathering and promotion of knowledge on the state of missionary work and needs across the world. He founded the Mildmay Movement for World Evangelisation, based in the Mildmay Centre, next to the Mildmay Mission Hospital (a separate and older organisation) in Islington, London. In 1924, together with like minded trustees, businessman Sidney J. W. Clark and Roland Allen, he set up the Survey Application Trust, an organisation to promote missionary work through publications. He served as the editor of the publication World Dominion. In 1949, he founded the publication The World Christian Handbook. His campaigning though his publications and the missionary conferences held at the Mildmay Centre were an inspiration to many at the time to fund and participate in missionary activities.

== Personal life ==
Cochrane was married twice. He had three sons by his first wife. After she died in 1930, he married again and gained six stepdaughters. He died in Pinner, Middlesex in 1953.
