= René Cassin =

French jurist and Nobel laureate

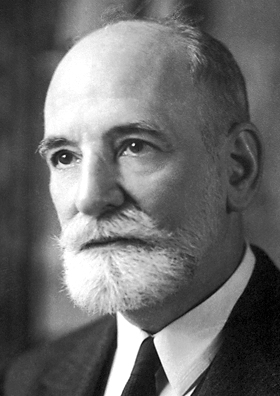

Member of the Constitutional Council
- In office 11 July 1960 – 2 March 1971
- Appointed by: Gaston Monnerville
- President: Léon Noël; Gaston Palewski
- Preceded by: Office established
- Succeeded by: François Luchaire

Personal details
- Born: 5 April 1887 Bayonne, France
- Died: 6 February 1976 (aged 88) Paris, France

René Samuel Cassin (5 October 1887 – 20 February 1976) was a French jurist known for co-authoring the Universal Declaration of Human Rights and receiving the Nobel Peace Prize.

Born in Bayonne, Cassin served as a soldier in the First World War during which he was seriously wounded. He was of Portuguese-Jewish descent.

On 24 June 1940, during the Second World War, Cassin heeded General Charles de Gaulle's radio appeal and joined him in London. Cassin used his legal expertise to help de Gaulle's Free French.

Between 1944 and 1959, Cassin was a member of the Council of State.

Seconded to the UN Commission on Human Rights after the war, he was a major contributor to the 1948 Universal Declaration of Human Rights. For that work, he received the Nobel Peace Prize in 1968. The same year, he was awarded one of the UN General Assembly's Human Rights Prizes.

== Early life ==
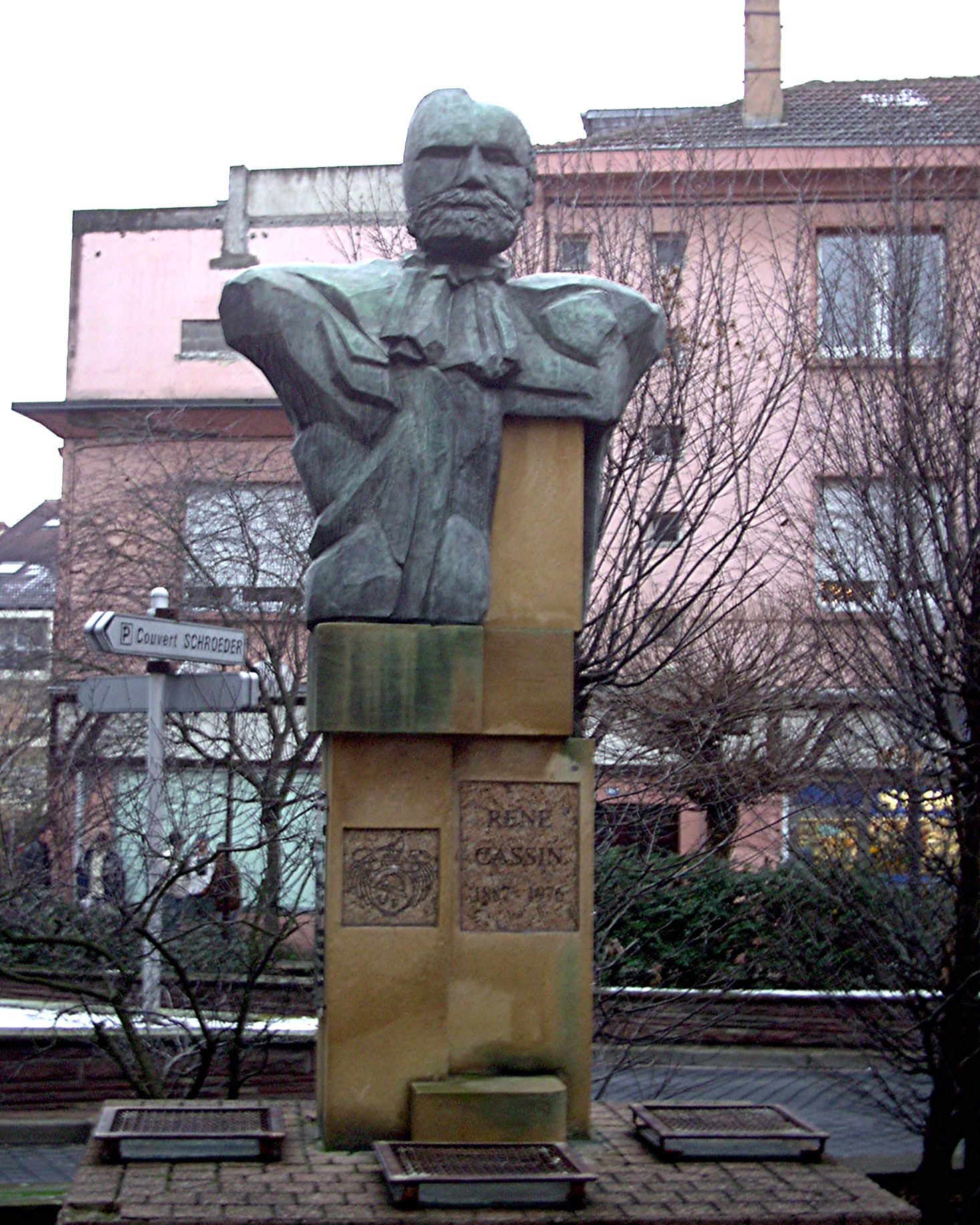
Memorial to Cassin in Forbach, France

Cassin was born in Bayonne on 5 October 1887, to a Sephardi Jewish family. He grew up in Nice, where he attended the Lycée Masséna, and graduated with a bachelor's degree at 17. At the University of Provence he studied political economics, constitutional history, and Roman law and was awarded distinctions in law, a university degree with distinction and the first prize in the competitive examinations in the faculty of law. He was an invited speaker at international peace conferences. In 1914 in Paris, he was awarded his doctorate in juridical science, economics and politics.

== First World War ==
Cassin served in the First World War in 1916 at the Battle of the Meuse. In one operation, he led the attack on enemy positions and was gravely injured in the arm, side and stomach by machine gunfire. A medic saved his life, but he received surgical treatment only ten days later at Antibes. He was awarded the Croix de Guerre for his actions but was too seriously injured to return to active duty, and he was mustered out as a war invalid.

== Interwar period ==
He helped to found the Union fédérale, a leftist pacifist organization for veterans.

Cassin also headed many non-governmental organizations (NGO) and founded the French Federation of Disabled War Veterans in 1918 and served until 1940 as its president and then as its honorary president.

In 1920, Cassin was appointed professor of law at Lille and in 1929 at Paris, where he continued to teach until 1960. In addition, he taught at the Academy of International Law of The Hague, and at the Geneva Graduate Institute, among other places.

As a French delegate to the League of Nations from 1924 to 1938, Cassin pressed for progress on disarmament and for developing institutions to aid the resolution of international conflicts.

== Second World War ==
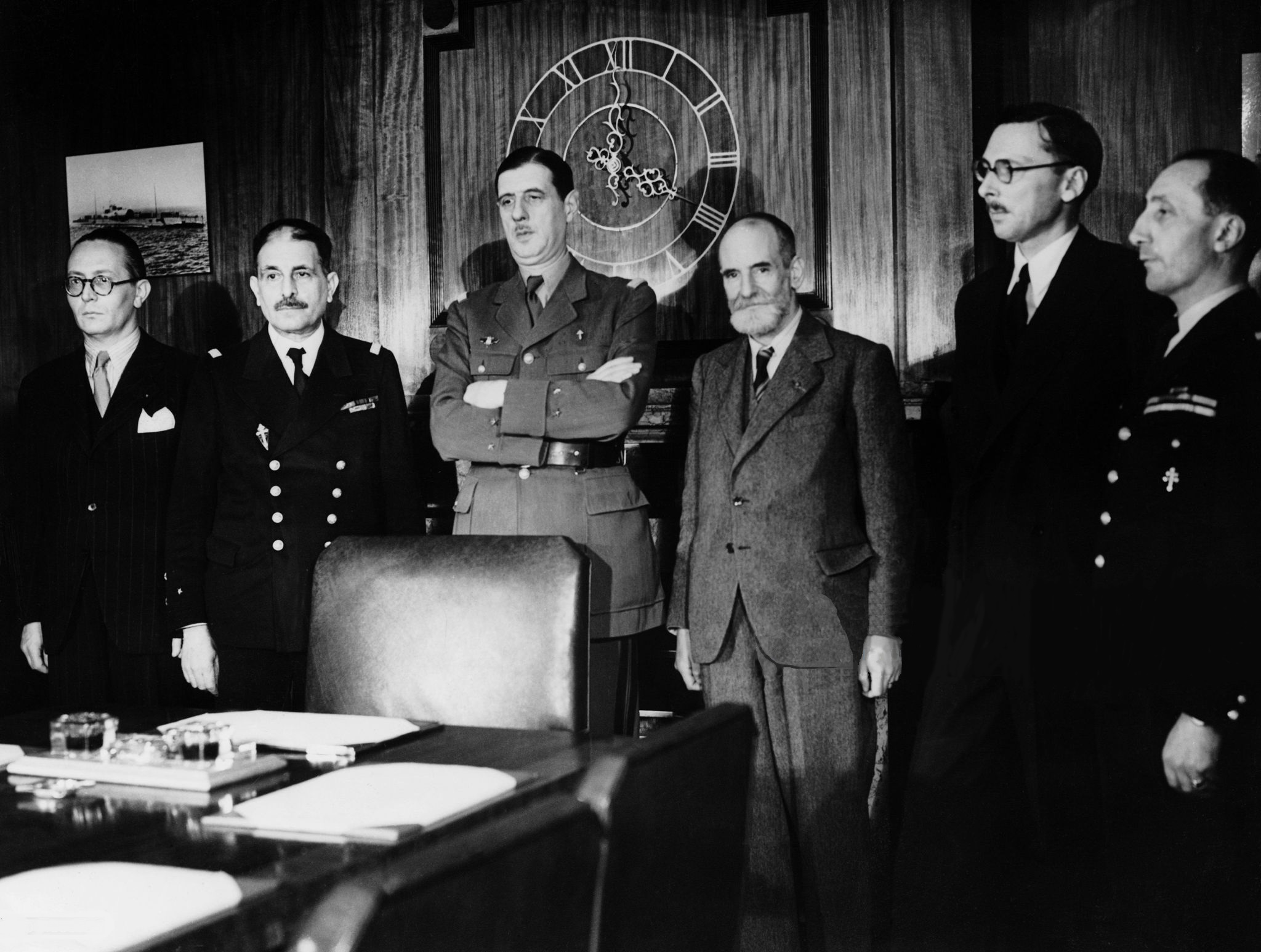
René Cassin with the French National Committee in London.

Refusing the armistice, Cassin embarked on a British ship, the SS Ettrick, in Saint-Jean-de-Luz on 24 June 1940, and joined General Charles de Gaulle in London to help him continue the war against Germany. Cassin was, therefore, one of the first to join de Gaulle. De Gaulle needed legal help to draft the statutes of Free France and so Cassin's arrival in London was very welcome.

René Cassin did not speak English but already knew leading academics and political figures like British Foreign Minister Anthony Eden.

In April 1941, Cassin made a radio broadcast from London by addressing himself especially to French Jews from a secular viewpoint and reminding them of the full and equal protection that France had always offered to Jews since the French Revolution. He exhorted them to help pay back that debt by joining the forces of Free France. In May, Vichy France stripped Cassin of his French citizenship and in 1942 sentenced him to death in absentia.

== Later life and career ==
After the war, Cassin was assigned to the United Nations to help draft the Universal Declaration of Human Rights. Working from a list of rights elaborated by the Canadian scholar and professor of law John Humphrey, Cassin produced a revised draft and expanded the text.

He served on the UN Human Rights Commission and the Hague Court of Arbitration.

He was also a member (1959–1965) and president (1965–1968) of the European Court of Human Rights. The court building is now on Allée René Cassin, in Strasbourg.

In 1945, General de Gaulle suggested that Cassin, having done so much for the French people, also do something to help the Jewish people. Cassin became the president of the French-Jewish Alliance Israelite Universelle (AIU) which had been dedicated primarily to educating Sephardi Jews living in the Ottoman Empire according to a modern French curriculum. As president of the AIU, Cassin worked with the American Jewish Committee and the Anglo-Jewish Association to found the Consultative Council of Jewish Organisations, a network dedicated to building support for Cassin's platform of human rights from a Jewish perspective while the UN human rights system was in its early stages of development.

In 1947, Cassin created the French Institute of Administrative Sciences (IFSA). He was the first president of the association, which organized many conferences to help to develop the French doctrine in administrative law.

On 10 November 1950, he was photographed at a UN radio, alongside Karim Azkoul, Georges Day and Herald CL Roy, participating in a roundtable discussion for the use of French-speaking countries. That is perhaps all the more interesting because Azkoul and Cassin differed so strongly in their perspectives concerning the politics of Zionism.

Cassin died in Paris in 1976 and was initially interred at the Montparnasse Cemetery in Paris. In 1987, his remains were exhumed and enshrined in the crypt of the Pantheon in Paris.

== Legacy ==
In 2001, the CCJO René Cassin was founded in Cassin's memory to promote universal human rights from a Jewish perspective.

The René Cassin Medal is awarded by the CCJO to those who have made an outstanding global contribution to human rights. As the head of the Alliance Israélite in France, Cassin had pursued civil rights for the Jews and was an active Zionist.

A high school in Jerusalem is named after him.

In 2003, the Basque government created the René Cassin Award "with the goal of publicly acknowledging and rewarding individuals or collectives that, through their personal or professional path, showed a strong commitment to the promotion, defence and divulgation of Human Rights". The award is given on 10 December, which is International Human Rights Day.

The law campus of Paris 1 Panthéon-Sorbonne University is named after him.

== See also ==
- International Institute of Human Rights
- List of Jewish Nobel laureates
- List of peace activists

== Works cited ==
- Crémieux-Brilhac, Jean-Louis (1996). La France libre: de l'appel du 18 juin à la Libération [Free France: from the Appeal of 18 June to Liberation]. La suite des temps (in French). Gallimard. ISBN 978-2-07-073032-2. OCLC 889439434.
- Forneris, Elias. "René Cassin and the invention of Free France, 1940–41." French History (2025): 1–19. https://doi.org/10.1093/fh/craf019
- Glendon, Mary Ann (2001). A World Made New: Eleanor Roosevelt and the Universal Declaration of Human Rights. London: Random House. ISBN 978-0-375-76046-4. OCLC 1011165627.
- Haberman, Frederick W.; Nobelstiftelsen (1972). Peace: 1951-1970. Elsevier Publishing Company. ISBN 978-0-444-41010-8. OCLC 500252296.
- "Hommage à René Cassin - Union Fédérale". Union Fédérale. 18 May 2016.
- Winter, Jay (8 February 2012). "René Cassin and the Alliance Israelite Universelle". Modern Judaism. 32 (1): 1–21. doi:10.1093/mj/kjr028. ISSN 0276-1114. OCLC 785309079.
