= Jens Allwood =

Swedish academic (born 1947)

Jens Allwood (born 20 August 1947) is a professor of linguistics at the University of Gothenburg and Head of SCCIIL - Interdisciplinary center, University of Gothenburg.

Jens Allwood has been professor of linguistics at Göteborg University since 1986. He is also director of the interdisciplinary cognitive science and communication oriented center SSKKII at the same university.

His research primarily includes work in semantics and pragmatics. He is investigating spoken language interaction from several perspectives, e.g. corpus linguistics, computer modelling of dialog, sociolinguistics and psycholinguistics as well as intercultural communication. Presently he is heading projects concerned with the semantics of spoken language phenomena, multimodal communication, cultural variation in communication and the influence of social activity on spoken language.

Activity-based communication analysis (ACA) is a term originally coined by Jens Allwood. It constitutes an interdisciplinary approach for analyzing social activity inspired by areas such as philosophy, linguistics, anthropology, psychology and sociology. ACA has evolved from a criticism of some shortcomings in texts put forward by scholars (such as Wittgenstein; Austin; Searle; Sacks; Grice; Sinclair & Coulthard).
