= Helge Refsum =

Norwegian jurist and politician

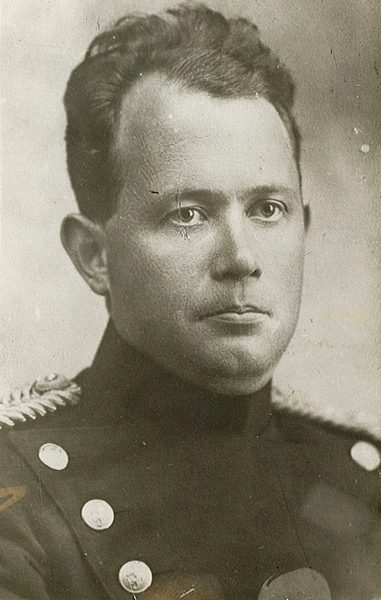
Helge Refsum, c. 1935

Helge Refsum (15 February 1897 - 8 September 1976) was a Norwegian jurist and politician for the Centre Party. Refsum received his law degree in 1921, and was secretary at the Ministry of Social Affairs from 1921 to 1926. He was appointed registrar in 1922 and in 1949 he became presiding judge at Gulating Court of Appeal. From 1965 to 1972, he sat on the Norwegian Nobel Committee.
