= Drafting of the Universal Declaration of Human Rights =

Process of UN project (1947–1948)

The Universal Declaration of Human Rights was drafted between early 1947 and late 1948 by a committee formed by the United Nations Commission on Human Rights. Further discussion and amendments were made by the Commission on Human Rights, the Economic and Social Council and the General Assembly of the United Nations. Representatives of the UN Commission on the Status of Women participated in the meetings of the UN Commission on Human Rights, debating for a gender inclusive language in the Declaration.

Cassin compared the Declaration to the portico of a Greek temple, with a foundation, steps, four columns, and a pediment. Members of the Commission who contributed significantly to the creation of the Declaration included Canadian John Peters Humphrey of the United Nations Secretariat, Eleanor Roosevelt of the United States (who chaired the Drafting Committee), René Cassin of France, Charles Malik of Lebanon, P. C. Chang of Republic of China, (Note: The Declaration was drafted during the Chinese Civil War. P.C. Chang was appointed as a representative by the Republic of China, which was recognised as the government of China at the time.) and Hansa Jivraj Mehta of India among others. While not a member of the drafting committee, the French philosopher Jacques Maritain was influential in the lead up to the drafting of the Universal Declaration, advocacy for it within UNESCO in 1947–1948, and in its subsequent advancement.

== Membership of the Drafting Committee ==
The Drafting Committee included

- Eleanor Roosevelt, United States (chair)
- P. C. Chang, Republic of China
- Charles Malik, Lebanon
- William Roy Hodgson, Australia
- Hernán Santa Cruz, Chile
- René Cassin, France
- Alexander E. Bogomolov, Soviet Union
- Charles Dukes, 1st Baron Dukeston, United Kingdom
- John Peters Humphrey, Canada

== The drafting process ==
John Peters Humphrey was newly appointed as Director of the Division of Human Rights within the United Nations Secretariat. In this role, he produced the first draft of a list of rights that were to form the basis of the Declaration.

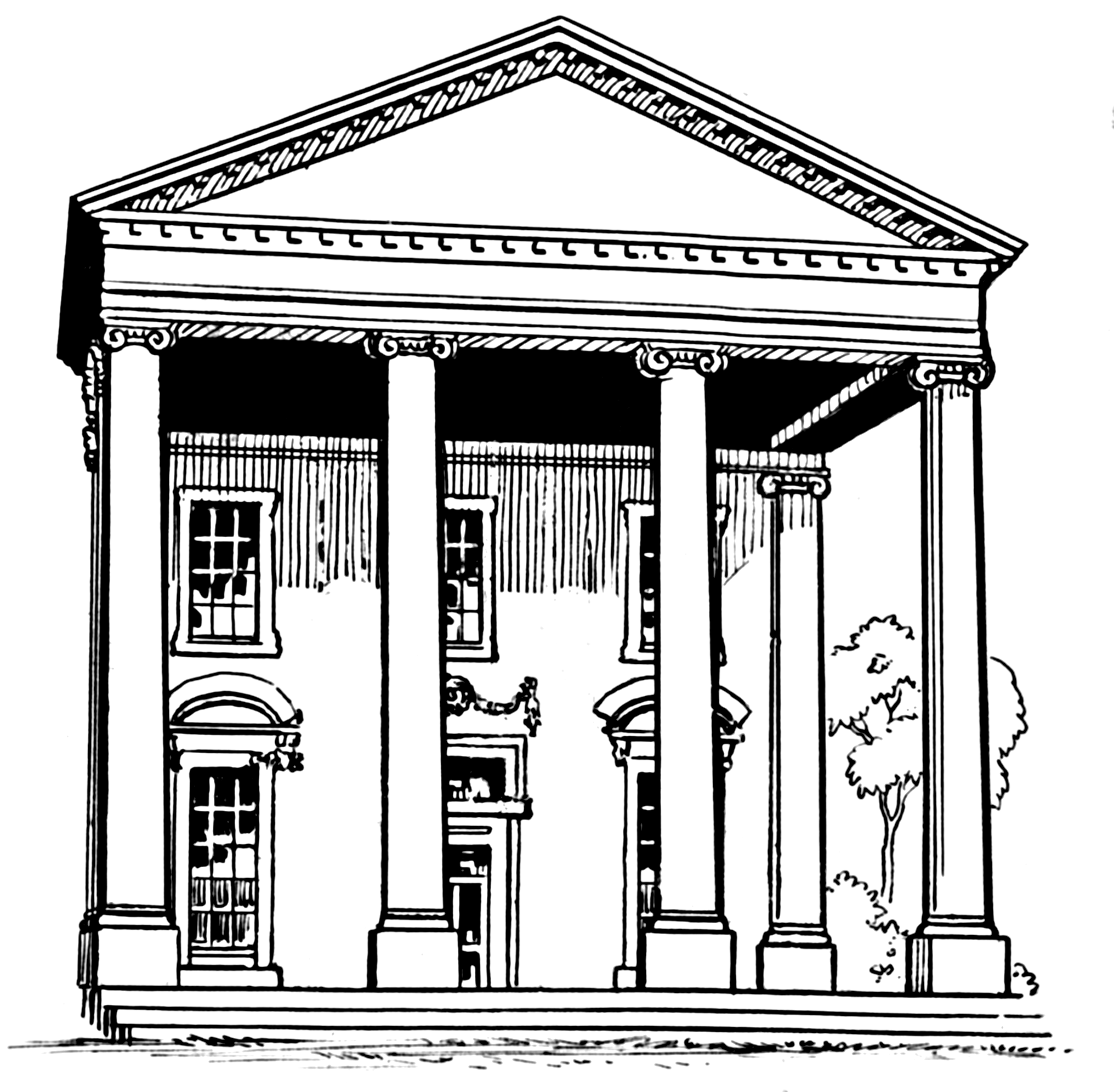
A portico with four columns, which René Cassin saw as a metaphor for the format of his draft

The underlying structure of the Universal Declaration was introduced in its second draft which was prepared by René Cassin working from the Humphrey draft. The structure was influenced by the Code Napoleon, including a preamble and introductory general principles. In Cassin's model, the last three articles of the Declaration provide the pediment which binds the structure together. These articles are concerned with the duty of the individual to society and the prohibition of use of rights in contravention of the purposes of the United Nations. Cassin compared the Declaration to the portico of a Greek temple, with a foundation, steps, four columns and a pediment.

The Cassin draft was submitted to the Commission on Human Rights and was to undergo editing in the commission, then in further drafts considered by the Third Committee of the United Nations, and finally in a draft before the General Assembly of the United Nations, which ultimately adopted the Declaration on 10 December 1948. The vote for the declaration was 48 to 0, with eight abstentions: the Byelorussian Soviet Socialist Republic, Czechoslovakia, the People's Republic of Poland, the Kingdom of Saudi Arabia, the Ukrainian Soviet Socialist Republic, the Union of South Africa, the Union of Soviet Socialist Republics, and the Socialist Federal Republic of Yugoslavia.

== Controversies ==
The first controversy to resolve was related to the very origin of the human rights, basically the discussion between the supporters of the concepts of natural rights (which humans are endowed by God or Nature) and positive rights (which humans acquire as a result of a rational agreement).

The second controversy was basically between the positions of the Marxist theory of the Soviet Bloc and the liberal theory of the Western World. In philosophical terms, the Soviet Bloc criticized the individualist stance of the issue, arguing in favor of the collectivism approach, where the rights of the collective dominate that of an individual. In political terms, the Soviet Union and its satellites, facing mounting accusations of human rights violations, argued that the declaration is a mere formality if it would not consider guarantees of economic and social rights. However these objections were of surprisingly little consequence, because the Soviet Bloc was not very active during the seating of the commission, perhaps indicating a preestablished decision not to sign the Declaration.

Another issue is the legal status of the declaration. The majority considered the document to be mainly of moral character. At the same time some participants argued in favor of adding certain legal aspects in terms of international law.

British representatives in particular were extremely frustrated that the proposal had moral but no legal obligation. (It was not until 1976 that the International Covenant on Civil and Political Rights came into force, giving a legal status to most of the Declaration)

== UDHR timeline ==
Source: United Nations Year Book 1948–1949, pp. 524 et seq

=== 1945 ===
- United Nations Conference on International Organization, San Francisco

=== 1946 ===
- 15 February, Establishment of "Nuclear Committee" of Commission on Human Rights.
- 29 April - 20 May 1946 - First Meeting of the Nuclear Committee.
- 21 June 1946 - The UN Economic and Social Council adopts terms of reference of permanent Commission on Human Rights

=== 1947 ===
- 27 January - 10 February - First Meeting of the Commission on Human Rights, Lake Success, New York. Drafting Committee established.
- 9 June - 25 June - First Meeting of the Drafting Committee, Lake Success, New York. Draft outline of an International Bill of Human Rights prepared by the UN Secretariat ("the Humphrey Draft"). Drafting Committee splits work into two documents: preparation of a declaration of human rights and a working paper on a draft international convention on human rights.
- 2 December - 17 December - Second Session of the Commission on Human Rights, Geneva. Commission begins to consider work on three projects: a declaration on human rights, and international convention on human rights and measures for implementation and enforcement

=== 1948 ===
- 3 May - 21 May, Second Session of the Drafting Committee, Lake Success, New York.
- 24 May - 18 June, Third Session of the Commission on Human Rights, Lake Success, New York. Commission adopts a draft Declaration and transmits it to the Economic and Social Council.
- 26 August, Economic and Social Council transmits draft to the General Assembly.
- 21 September – Third session of the United Nations General Assembly begins
- 30 September - 7 December, Third Committee of General Assembly spends 81 meetings considering the Declaration. 168 resolutions for amendments to the draft, submitted and considered.
- 1–4 December, Sub-committee of Third Committee charged with cross checking 5 official language versions.
- 10 December, Universal Declaration of Human Rights adopted by the United Nations General Assembly
