= Universal Declaration of Human Rights =

Document of human rights by the United Nations

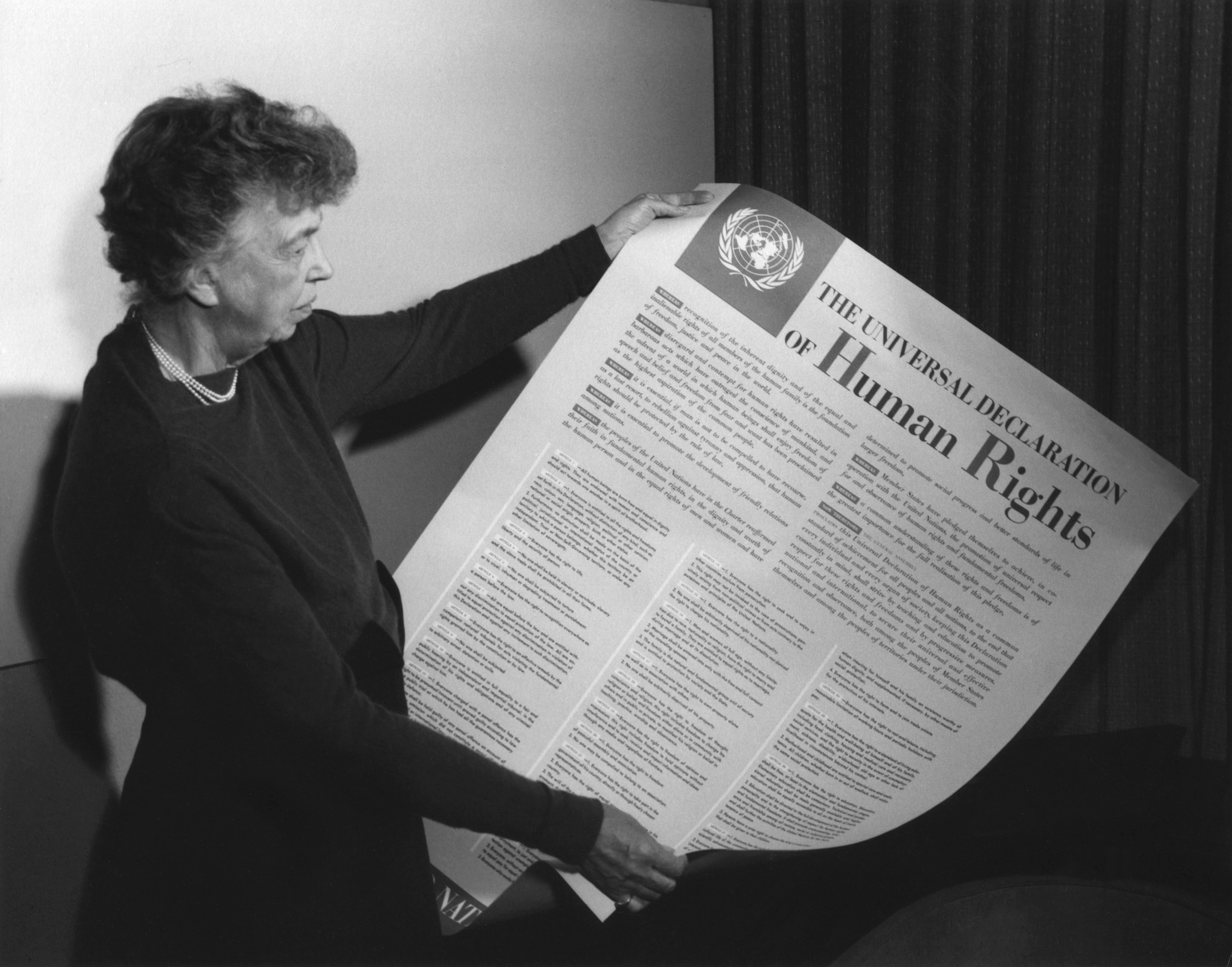
- Eleanor Roosevelt holding the English-language version of the Universal Declaration of Human Rights in November 1949

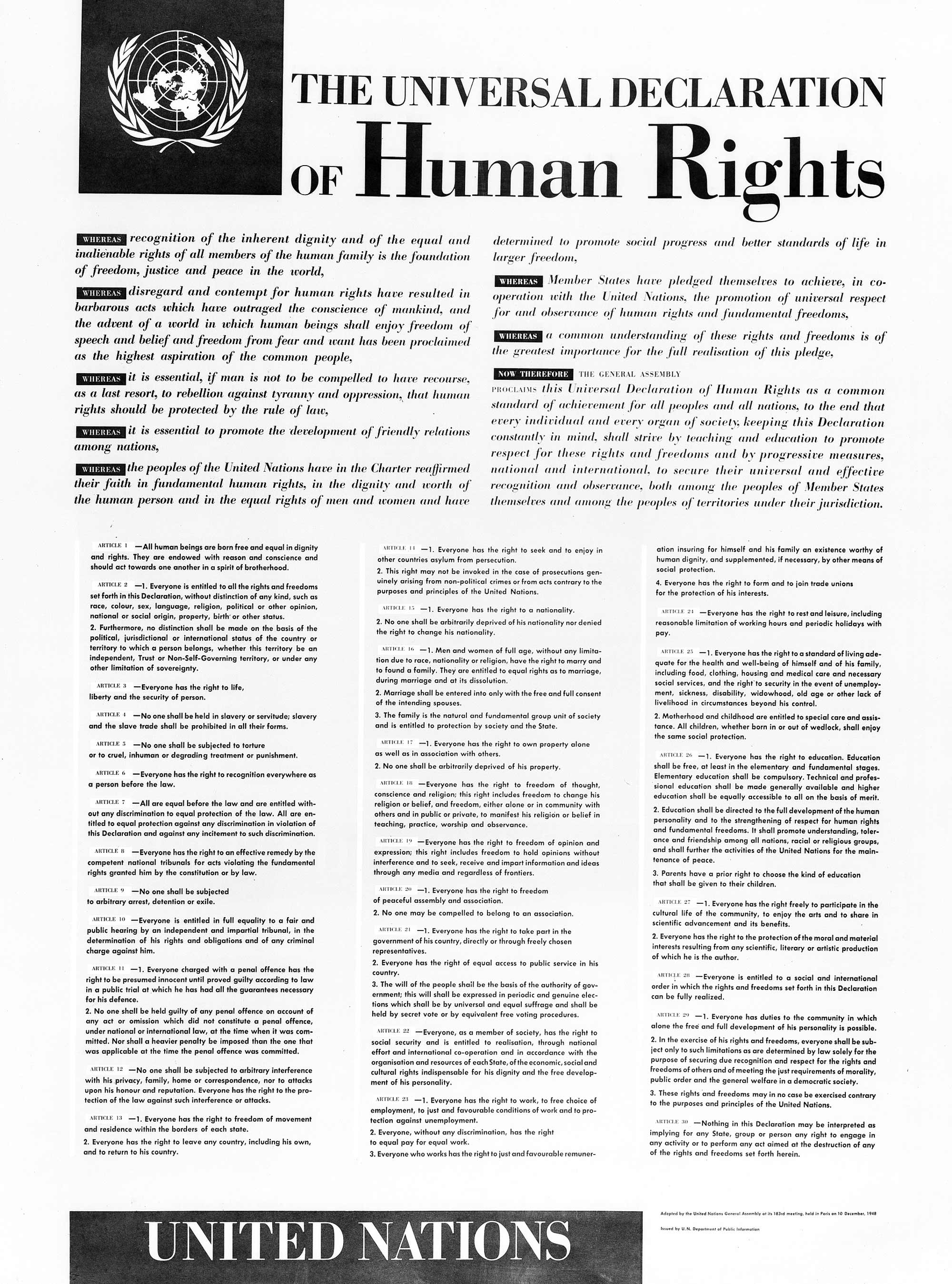
- The human rights adopted by the United Nations General Assembly in Paris on 10 December 1948
- Created: 1948
- Ratified: 10 December 1948
- Location: Palais de Chaillot, Paris
- Author: Draft Committee (Note: Included John Peters Humphrey (Canada), René Cassin (France), P. C. Chang (Republic of China), Charles Malik (Lebanon), Hansa Mehta (India) and Eleanor Roosevelt (United States); see Creation and drafting section below.)
- Purpose: Human rights

Official website
- un.org/udhr

Full text
- Universal Declaration of Human Rights at Wikisource

The Universal Declaration of Human Rights (UDHR) is a document adopted by the United Nations General Assembly that codifies some of the rights and freedoms of all human beings. Drafted by a United Nations (UN) committee chaired by Eleanor Roosevelt, it was accepted by the General Assembly as Resolution 217 during its third session on 10 December 1948 at the Palais de Chaillot in Paris, France. Of the 58 members of the UN at the time, 48 voted in favour, none against, eight abstained, and two did not vote.

A foundational text in the history of human and civil rights, the Declaration consists of 30 articles detailing an individual's "basic rights and fundamental freedoms" and affirming their universal character as inherent, inalienable, and applicable to all human beings. Adopted as a "common standard of achievement for all peoples and all nations", the UDHR commits nations to recognize all humans as being "born free and equal in dignity and rights" regardless of "nationality, place of residence, sex, national or ethnic origin, colour, religion, language, or any other status".

The Declaration is generally considered to be a milestone document for its universalist language, which makes no reference to a particular culture, political system, or religion. It directly inspired the development of international human rights law, and was the first step in the formulation of the International Bill of Human Rights, which was completed in 1966 and came into force in 1976. Although not legally binding, the contents of the UDHR have been elaborated and incorporated into subsequent international treaties, regional human rights instruments, and national constitutions and legal codes.

All 193 member states of the UN have ratified at least one of the nine binding treaties influenced by the Declaration, with the vast majority ratifying four or more. While there is a wide consensus that the declaration itself is non-binding and not part of customary international law, there is also a consensus in most countries that many of its provisions are part of customary law, although courts in some nations have been more restrictive in interpreting its legal effect. Nevertheless, the UDHR has influenced legal, political, and social developments on both the global and national levels, with its significance partly evidenced by its 577 translations.

== Structure and content ==
The underlying structure of the Universal Declaration was influenced by the Code Napoléon, including a preamble and introductory general principles. Its final structure took form in the second draft prepared by French jurist René Cassin, who worked on the initial draft prepared by Canadian legal scholar John Peters Humphrey.

The Universal Declaration of Human Rights consists of the following:

- The preamble sets out the historical and social causes that led to the necessity of drafting the Declaration.
- Articles 1–2 establish the basic concepts of dignity, liberty, and equality for all humans regardless of characteristics such as race, gender, religion, or nationality (later interpreted to include sexual orientation and disability).
- Articles 3–5 establish other individual rights, such as the right to life and the prohibition of slavery and torture.
- Articles 6–11 refer to the fundamental legality of human rights with specific remedies cited for their defence when violated.
- Articles 12–17 set forth the rights of the individual towards the community, including freedom of movement and residence within each state, the right of property, the right to a nationality and right to asylum.
- Articles 18–21 sanction the "constitutional liberties" and spiritual, public, and political freedoms, such as freedom of thought, conscience, religion, expression, news media, association, and assembly.
- Articles 22–27 sanction an individual's economic, social and cultural rights, including the right to work, health, housing, and education. It upholds an expansive right to an adequate standard of living, and makes special mention of care given to those in motherhood or childhood.
- Articles 28–30 establish the general means of exercising these rights, the areas in which the rights of the individual cannot be applied, the duty of the individual to society, and the prohibition of the use of rights in contravention of the purposes of the United Nations Organization.

Cassin compared the Declaration to the portico of a Greek temple, with a foundation, steps, four columns, and a pediment. Articles 1 and 2—with their principles of dignity, liberty, equality and brotherhood—serve as the foundation blocks. The seven paragraphs of the preamble, setting out the reasons for the Declaration, represent the steps leading up to the temple. The main body of the Declaration forms the four columns. The first column (articles 3–11) constitutes rights of the individual, such as the right to life and the prohibition of slavery. The second column (articles 12–17) constitutes the rights of the individual in civil and political society. The third column (articles 18–21) is concerned with spiritual, public, and political freedoms, such as freedom of religion and freedom of association. The fourth column (articles 22–27) sets out social, economic, and cultural rights. The final three articles provide the "pediment" which binds the structure together, as they emphasize the mutual duties of every individual to one another and to society.

Charles Malik, the Lebanese representative on the drafting commission, pointed out the need for an article on the right or popular entitlement to "a social and international order in which the rights and freedoms set forth in this Declaration can be fully realised", which became Article 28.

== History ==
=== Background ===
State of the Union (Four Freedoms) (6 January 1941)
Franklin Delano Roosevelt's 6 January 1941 State of the Union address introducing the theme of the Four Freedoms (starting at 32:02)

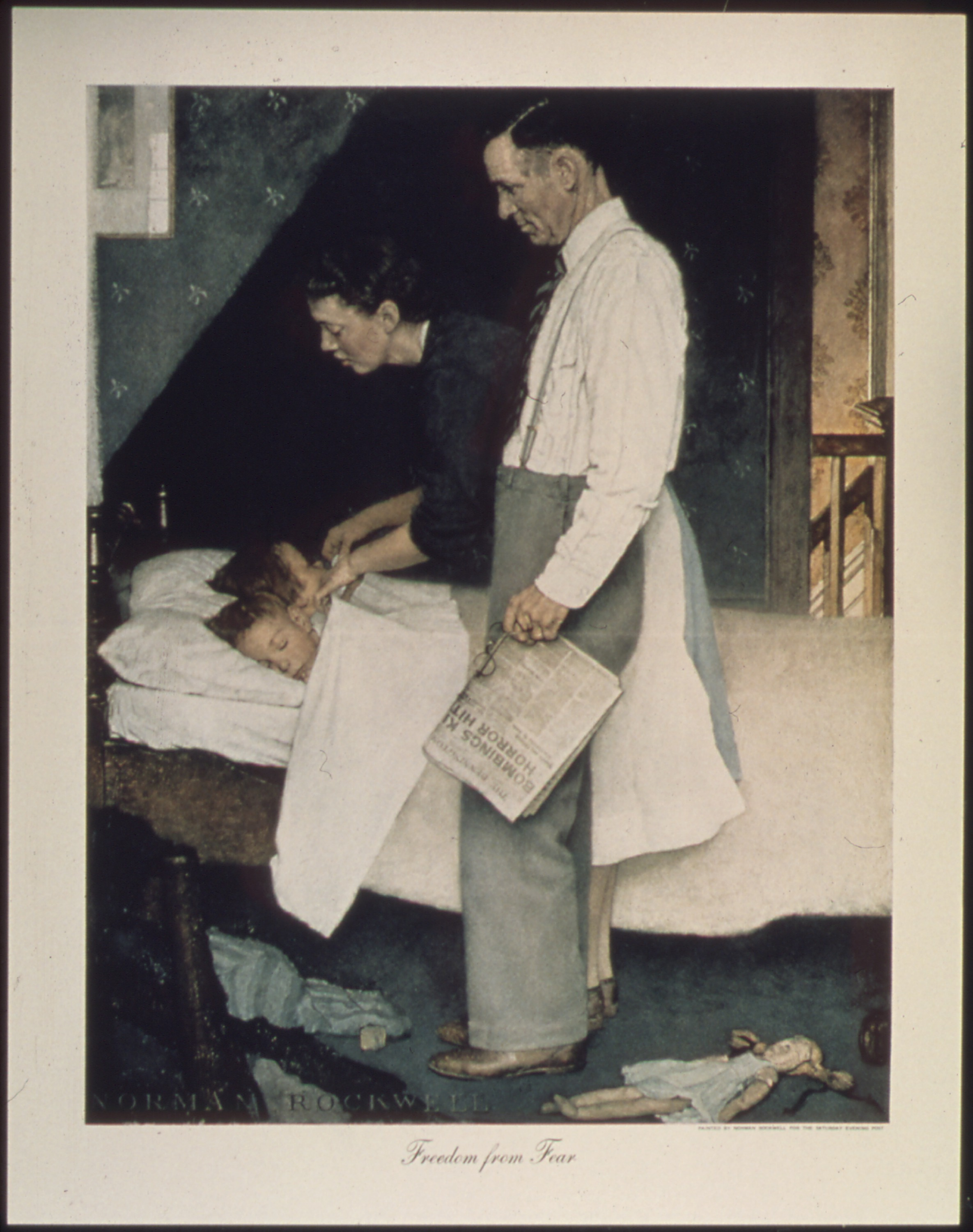
Freedom from Fear (Saturday, March 13, 1943)–from the Four Freedoms series by Norman Rockwell. The freedom from fear is mentioned in the preamble of the Declaration.

During World War II, the Allies—known formally as the United Nations—adopted as their basic war aims the Four Freedoms: freedom of speech, freedom of religion, freedom from want, and freedom from fear. Towards the end of the war, the United Nations Charter was debated, drafted, and ratified to reaffirm "faith in fundamental human rights, and dignity and worth of the human person" and commit all member states to promote "universal respect for, and observance of, human rights and fundamental freedoms for all without distinction as to race, sex, language, or religion". When the atrocities committed by Nazi Germany became fully apparent after the war, the consensus within the world community was that the UN Charter did not sufficiently define the rights to which it referred. It was deemed necessary to create a universal declaration that specified the rights of individuals so as to give effect to the Charter's provisions on human rights.

=== The drafting committee ===
In June 1946, the Economic and Social Council (ECOSOC)—a principal organ of the newly founded United Nations that is responsible for promoting human rights, created the Commission on Human Rights (CHR)—a standing body within the United Nations that was tasked with preparing what was initially conceived as an International Bill of Rights. It had 18 members from various national, religious, and political backgrounds, so as to be representative of humanity. In February 1947, the Commission established a special Universal Declaration of Human Rights Drafting Committee, chaired by Eleanor Roosevelt of the United States, to write the articles of the Declaration. Roosevelt, in her position, was key to the U.S. effort to encourage the General Assembly's adoption of a Universal Declaration of Human Rights. The Committee met in two sessions over the course of two years.

Canadian John Peters Humphrey, the newly appointed Director of the Division of Human Rights within the United Nations Secretariat, was called upon by the UN Secretary-General to work on the project, becoming the Declaration's principal drafter. Other prominent members of the Drafting Committee included Vice-Chairman P.C. Chang of the Republic of China, René Cassin of France; and its Committee Rapporteur Charles Malik of Lebanon. A month after its creation, the Drafting Committee was expanded to include representatives of Australia, Chile, France, the Soviet Union, and the United Kingdom, in addition to the inaugural members from China, France, Lebanon, and the United States.

=== Creation and drafting ===
Humphrey is credited with devising the "blueprint" for the Declaration, while Cassin composed the first draft. Both received considerable input from other members, each of whom reflected different professional and ideological backgrounds. The Declaration's pro-family phrases allegedly derived from Cassin and Malik, who were influenced by the Christian Democracy movement; Malik, a Christian theologian, was known for appealing across religious lines; he cited the Summa Theologica of Thomas Aquinas, and studied the different Christian sects. Chang urged removing all references to religion to make the document more universal, and used aspects of Confucianism to settle stalemates in negotiations. Hernán Santa Cruz of Chile, an educator and judge, strongly supported the inclusion of socioeconomic rights, which had been opposed by some Western nations. The members agreed that the philosophical debate centered between the opposing opinions of Chang and Malik, with Malik later singling out Chang when thanking the members, saying that there were too many to mention, but Chang's ideas impacted his own opinions in the making of the draft.

In her memoirs, Roosevelt commented on the debates and discussions that informed the UDHR, describing one such exchange during the Drafting Committee's first session in June 1947:

Dr. Chang was a pluralist and held forth in charming fashion on the proposition that there is more than one kind of ultimate reality. The Declaration, he said, should reflect more than simply Western ideas and Dr. Humphrey would have to be eclectic in his approach. His remark, though addressed to Dr. Humphrey, was really directed at Dr. Malik, from whom it drew a prompt retort as he expounded at some length the philosophy of Thomas Aquinas. Dr. Humphrey joined enthusiastically in the discussion, and I remember that at one point Dr. Chang suggested that the Secretariat might well spend a few months studying the fundamentals of Confucianism!

In May 1948, roughly a year after its creation, the Drafting Committee held its second and final session, where it considered the comments and suggestions of member states and international bodies, principally the United Nations Conference on Freedom of Information, which took place the prior March and April; the Commission on the Status of Women, a body within ECOSOC that reported on the state of women's rights worldwide; and the Ninth International Conference of American States, held in Bogota, Colombia from March to May 1948, which adopted the South American-based American Declaration of the Rights and Duties of Man, the world's first general international human rights instrument. Delegates and consultants from several United Nations bodies, international organizations, and nongovernmental organizations also attended and submitted suggestions. It was also hoped that an International Bill of Human Rights with legal force could be drafted and submitted for adoption alongside the Declaration.

=== The final draft ===
Upon the session's conclusion on 21 May 1948, the Committee submitted to the Commission on Human Rights a redrafted text of the "International Declaration of Human Rights" and the "International Covenant of Human Rights", which together would form an International Bill of Rights. The redrafted Declaration was further examined and discussed by the Commission on Human Rights in its third session in Geneva 21 May through 18 June 1948. The so-called "Geneva text" was circulated among member states and subject to several proposed amendments; for example, Hansa Mehta of India notably suggested that the Declaration assert that "all human beings are created equal", instead of "all men are created equal", to better reflect gender equality.

Charles Theodore Te Water of South Africa fought very hard to have the word dignity removed from the declaration, saying that "dignity had no universal standard and that it was not a 'right'". Te Water believed—correctly, as it turned out—that listing human dignity as a human right would lead to criticism of the apartheid system that had just been introduced by the new National Party government of South Africa. Malik in response stated that Prime Minister Jan Smuts of South Africa had played an important role in drafting the United Nations Charter in 1945, and it was Smuts who inserted the word dignity as a human right into the charter. Despite te Water's efforts, the word dignity was included in the declaration as a human right.

=== Approval ===
With a vote of twelve in favour, none opposed, and four abstaining, the United Nations Commission on Human Rights, with Eleanor Roosevelt in the chair, approved the proposed Declaration on 18 June 1948, although it was unable to examine the contents and implementation of the proposed Covenant. The Commission forwarded the approved text of the Declaration, as well as the Covenant, to the Economic and Social Council for its review and approval during its seventh session in July and August 1948. The Council adopted Resolution 151(VII) of 26 August 1948, transmitting the draft International Declaration of Human Rights to the UN General Assembly.

The Third Committee of the General Assembly, which convened from 30 September to 7 December 1948 during the third session of the United Nations General Assembly, held 81 meetings concerning the draft Declaration, including debating and resolving 168 proposals for amendments by United Nations member states. On its 178th meeting on 6 December, the Third Committee adopted the Declaration with 29 votes in favour, none opposed and seven abstentions. The document was subsequently submitted to the wider General Assembly for its consideration on 9 and 10 December 1948.

=== Adoption ===
The Universal Declaration was adopted by the General Assembly as UN Resolution A/RES/217(III)[A] on 10 December 1948 in the Palais de Chaillot, Paris. (Note: United Nations headquarters in New York would not be complete until 1952, after which it became the permanent seat of the General Assembly.) Of the 58 United Nations members at the time, 48 voted in favour, none against, eight abstained, and Honduras and Yemen failed to vote or abstain.

Eleanor Roosevelt is credited with having been instrumental in mustering support for the Declaration's adoption, both in her native U.S. and across the world, owing to her ability to appeal to different and often opposing political blocs.

The meeting record provides firsthand insight into the debate on the Declaration's adoption. South Africa's position can be seen as an attempt to protect its system of apartheid, which clearly violated several articles in the Declaration. Saudi Arabia's abstention was prompted primarily by two of the Declaration's articles: Article 18, which states that everyone has the right "to change his religion or belief", and Article 16, on equal marriage rights. The abstentions by the six communist nations were explained by their claim that the Declaration did not go far enough in condemning fascism and national-socialism. However, Eleanor Roosevelt felt that the reason for the abstentions was Article 13, which provided the right of citizens to leave their countries. Other observers pin the Soviet bloc's opposition to the Declaration's "negative rights", such as provisions calling on governments not to violate certain civil and political rights.

The British delegation, while voting in favour of the Declaration, expressed frustration that the proposed document had moral obligations but lacked legal force; it would not be until 1976 that the International Covenant on Civil and Political Rights came into force, giving a legal status to most of the Declaration.

Voting in the plenary session: Green countries: voted in favour; Orange countries: abstained; Black countries: failed to abstain or vote; Grey countries: were not a part of the UN at time of voting

The 48 countries that voted in favour of the Declaration are:

- Afghanistan
- Argentina
- Australia
- Belgium
- Bolivia
- Brazil
- Burma
- Canada^{[a]}
- Chile
- China
- Colombia
- Costa Rica
- Cuba
- Denmark
- Dominican Republic
- Ecuador
- Egypt
- El Salvador
- Ethiopia
- France
- Greece
- Guatemala
- Haiti
- Iceland
- India
- Iran
- Iraq
- Lebanon
- Liberia
- Luxembourg
- Mexico
- Netherlands
- New Zealand
- Nicaragua
- Norway
- Pakistan
- Panama
- Paraguay
- Peru
- Philippines
- Siam
- Sweden
- Syria
- Turkey
- United Kingdom
- United States
- Uruguay
- Venezuela

a. Despite the central role played by the Canadian John Peters Humphrey, the Canadian Government at first abstained from voting on the Declaration's draft, but later voted in favour of the final draft in the General Assembly.

Eight countries abstained:

- Czechoslovakia
- Poland
- Saudi Arabia
- Soviet Union
- Byelorussian SSR
- Ukrainian SSR
- South Africa
- Yugoslavia

Two countries did not vote:

- Honduras
- Kingdom of Yemen

Current UN member states, particularly in Africa, gained sovereignty later, and many nations in Europe and the Pacific were under administration due to the recently concluded World War II, which accounts for the comparatively smaller number of states who participated in the historic vote.

=== International Human Rights Day ===
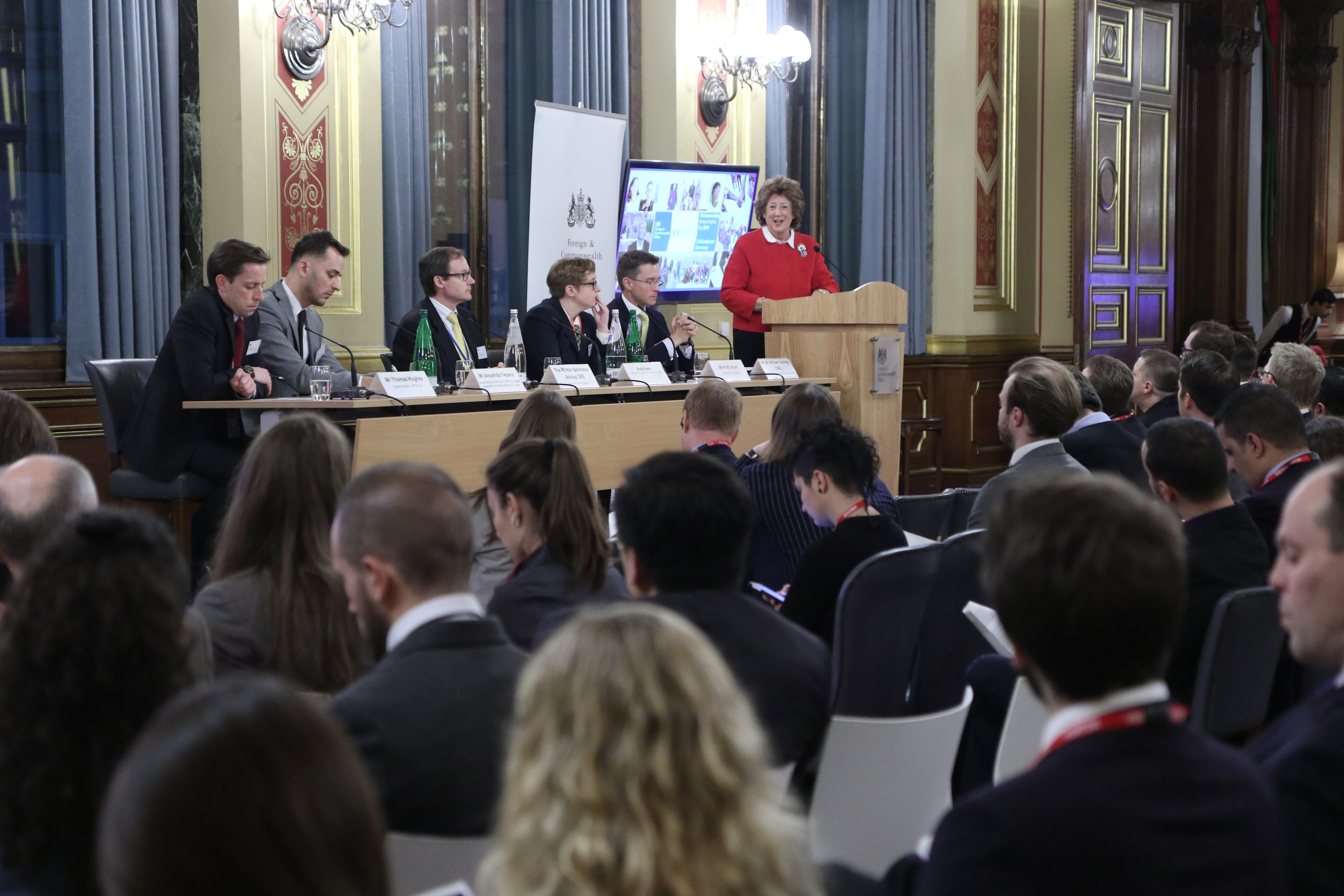
Former Foreign Office minister Baroness Anelay speaking at the Commemorating Human Rights Day event in London, 8 December 2016

10 December, the anniversary of the adoption of the Universal Declaration, is celebrated annually as World Human Rights Day or International Human Rights Day. The commemoration is observed by individuals, community and religious groups, human rights organizations, parliaments, governments, and the United Nations. Decadal commemorations are often accompanied by campaigns to promote awareness of the Declaration and of human rights in general. 2008 marked the 60th anniversary of the Declaration, and was accompanied by year-long activities around the theme "Dignity and justice for all of us". Likewise, the 70th anniversary in 2018 was marked by the global #StandUpForHumanRights campaign, which targeted youth.

== Impact ==
=== Significance ===
At the time of the Declaration's adoption by the General Assembly in 1948, Eleanor Roosevelt said:

In giving our approval to the declaration today, it is of primary importance that we keep clearly in mind the basic character of the document. It is not a treaty; it is not an international agreement. It is not and does not purport to be a statement of law or of legal obligation. It is a declaration of basic principles of human rights and freedoms, to be stamped with the approval of the General Assembly by formal vote of its members, and to serve as a common standard of achievement for all peoples of all nations.

The UDHR is considered groundbreaking for providing a comprehensive and universal set of principles in a secular, apolitical document that explicitly transcends cultures, religions, legal systems, and political ideologies. Its claim to universality has been described as "boundlessly idealistic" and the "most ambitious feature".

The Declaration was officially adopted as a French document, with official translations in English, Chinese, Russian and Spanish, all of which are official working languages of the UN. Due to its inherently universalist nature, the United Nations has made a concerted effort to translate the document into as many languages as possible, in collaboration with private and public entities and individuals. In 1999, the Guinness Book of Records described the Declaration as the world's "Most Translated Document", with 298 translations; the record was once again certified a decade later when the text reached 370 different languages and dialects. The UDHR achieved a milestone of more than 500 translations in 2016, and as of 2024, had been translated into 562 languages, remaining the most translated document.

In its preamble, governments commit themselves and their people to progressive measures that secure the universal and effective recognition and observance of the human rights set out in the Declaration. Eleanor Roosevelt supported the adoption of the text as a declaration, rather than as a treaty, because she believed that it would have the same kind of influence on global society as the United States Declaration of Independence had within the United States. Even though it is not legally binding, the Declaration has been incorporated into or influenced most national constitutions since 1948. It has also served as the foundation for a growing number of national laws, international laws, and treaties, as well as for a growing number of regional, subnational, and national institutions protecting and promoting human rights. These kinds of measures focus on some principles that regard every culture/community especially when martial status take place or inheritance. In other words, every culture has its own norms and every individual is allowed to practice them unless they use them as a source of power.

The Declaration's all-encompassing provisions serve as a "yardstick" and point of reference by which countries' commitments to human rights are judged, such as through the treaty bodies and other mechanisms of various human rights treaties that monitor implementation.

=== Legal effect ===
In international law, a declaration is distinct from a treaty in that it generally states aspirations or understandings among the parties, rather than binding obligations. The Declaration was explicitly adopted to reflect and elaborate on the customary international law reflected in the "fundamental freedoms" and "human rights" referenced in the United Nations Charter, which is binding on all member states. For this reason, the Universal Declaration of Human Rights is a fundamental constitutive document of the United Nations and, by extension, all 193 parties of the United Nations Charter.

Nevertheless, the status of the Declaration as a legally enforceable document varies widely around the world: some countries have incorporated it into their domestic laws, while other countries consider it merely a statement of ideals, with no binding provisions.

Many international lawyers believe that the Declaration forms part of customary international law and is a powerful tool in applying diplomatic and moral pressure to governments that violate its articles. One prominent international jurist described the UDHR as being "universally regarded as expounding generally accepted norms". Other legal scholars have further argued that the Declaration constitutes jus cogens, fundamental principles of international law from which no state may deviate or derogate. The 1968 United Nations International Conference on Human Rights advised that the Declaration "constitutes an obligation for the members of the international community" to all persons.

The Declaration has served as the foundation for two binding United Nations human rights covenants: the International Covenant on Civil and Political Rights and the International Covenant on Economic, Social and Cultural Rights. The principles of the Declaration are elaborated in other binding international treaties such as the International Convention on the Elimination of All Forms of Racial Discrimination, the International Convention on the Elimination of Discrimination Against Women, the United Nations Convention on the Rights of the Child, the United Nations Convention Against Torture, and many more. The Declaration continues to be widely cited by governments, academics, advocates, and constitutional courts, and by individuals who appeal to its principles for the protection of their recognized human rights.

==== National law ====
According to a 2022 study, the UDHR "significantly accelerated the adoption of a particular set of [national] constitutional rights". One scholar estimates that at least 90 national constitutions drafted since the Declaration's adoption in 1948 "contain statements of fundamental rights which, where they do not faithfully reproduce the provisions of the Universal Declaration, are at least inspired by it". At least 20 African nations that attained independence in the decades immediately following 1948 explicitly referenced the UDHR in their constitutions. As of 2014, the constitutions that still directly cite the Declaration are those of Afghanistan, Benin, Bosnia-Herzegovina, Burkina Faso, Burundi, Cambodia, Chad, Comoros, Côte d'Ivoire, Equatorial Guinea, Ethiopia, Democratic Republic of the Congo, Gabon, Guinea, Haiti, Mali, Mauritania, Nicaragua, Niger, Portugal, Romania, Rwanda, São Tomé and Príncipe, Senegal, Somalia, Spain, Togo, and Yemen. Moreover, the constitutions of Portugal, Romania, São Tomé and Príncipe, and Spain compel their courts to "interpret" constitutional norms consistently with the Universal Declaration.

Judicial and political figures in many nations have directly invoked the UDHR as an influence or inspiration on their courts, constitutions, or legal codes. Indian courts have ruled the Indian Constitution "[embodies] most of the articles contained in the Declaration". Nations as diverse as Antigua, Chad, Chile, Kazakhstan, Saint Vincent and the Grenadines, and Zimbabwe have derived constitutional and legal provisions from the Declaration. In some cases, specific provisions of the UDHR are incorporated or otherwise reflected in national law. The right to health or to protection of health is found in the constitutions of France, Belgium, Kyrgyzstan, Paraguay, Peru, Thailand, and Togo; constitutional obligations on the government to provide health services exist in Armenia, Cambodia, Ethiopia, Finland, South Korea, Kyrgyzstan, Paraguay, Thailand, and Yemen.

A survey of U.S. cases through 1988 found five references to the Declaration by the United States Supreme Court; sixteen references by federal courts of appeal; twenty-four references by federal district courts; one reference by a bankruptcy court; and several references by five state courts. Likewise, research conducted in 1994 identified 94 references to the Declaration by federal and state courts across the U.S.

In 2004, the U.S. Supreme Court ruled in Sosa v. Alvarez-Machain that the Declaration "does not of its own force impose obligations as a matter of international law", and that the political branches of the U.S. federal government can "scrutinize" the nation's obligations to international instruments and their enforceability. However, U.S. courts and legislatures may still use the Declaration to inform or interpret laws concerned with human rights, a position shared by the courts of Belgium, the Netherlands, India, and Sri Lanka.

== Praise and support ==
The Universal Declaration has received praise from a number of notable activists, jurists, and political leaders. Lebanese philosopher and diplomat Charles Malik called it "an international document of the first order of importance", while Eleanor Roosevelt—first chairperson of the Commission on Human Rights (CHR) that helped draft the Declaration—stated that it "may well become the international Magna Carta of all men everywhere". At the 1993 United Nations World Conference on Human Rights, one of the largest international gatherings on human rights, diplomats and officials representing 100 nations reaffirmed their governments' "commitment to the purposes and principles contained in the Charter of the United Nations and the Universal Declaration of Human Rights" and emphasized that the Declaration as "the source of inspiration and has been the basis for the United Nations in making advances in standard setting as contained in the existing international human rights instruments". In a speech on 5 October 1995, Pope John Paul II called the Declaration "one of the highest expressions of the human conscience of our time". In a statement on 10 December 2003 on behalf of the European Union, diplomat Marcello Spatafora said that the Declaration "placed human rights at the centre of the framework of principles and obligations shaping relations within the international community".

As a pillar of international human rights, the UDHR enjoys widespread support among international and nongovernmental organizations. The International Federation for Human Rights (FIDH), one of the oldest human rights organizations, has as its core mandate the promotion of the respect for all rights set out in the Declaration, the International Covenant on Civil and Political Rights, and the International Covenant on Economic, Social and Cultural Rights. Amnesty International, the third oldest international human rights organization, has regularly observed Human Rights Day and organized worldwide events to bring awareness and support of the UDHR. Some organizations, such as the Quaker United Nations Office and the American Friends Service Committee have developed curriculum or programmes to educate young people on the UDHR.

Specific provisions of the UDHR are cited or elaborated by interest groups in relation to their specific area of focus. In 1997, the council of the American Library Association (ALA) endorsed Articles 18 through 20 concerning freedoms of thought, opinion, and expression, which were codified in the ALA Universal Right to Free Expression and the Library Bill of Rights. The Declaration formed the basis of the ALA's claim that censorship, invasion of privacy, and interference of opinions are human rights violations.

== Criticism ==
=== Soviet Union and Marxism–Leninism ===
During the creation of the Universal Declaration of Human Rights, the Soviet Union criticized its promoters for not prioritizing social rights over individual rights and positive rights over negative rights enough according to Marxism–Leninism.

=== Islam ===
Most Muslim-majority countries that were then members of the United Nations signed the Declaration in 1948, including the kingdoms of Afghanistan, Egypt, and Iraq, Pahlavi Iran, and the First Syrian Republic; the Republic of Turkey, which had an overwhelmingly Muslim population but an officially secular government, also voted in favour. Saudi Arabia was the sole abstainer on the Declaration among Muslim-majority countries, claiming that it violated the Islamic law (sharīʿa). Pakistan, officially an Islamic state, signed the declaration and critiqued the Saudi position, strongly arguing in favour of including freedom of religion as a fundamental human right of the UDHR.

Moreover, some Muslim diplomats would later help draft other United Nations human rights treaties. For example, Iraq's representative to the United Nations, Bedia Afnan's insistence on wording that recognized gender equality resulted in Article 3 within the ICCPR and ICESCR, which, together with the UDHR, form the International Bill of Rights. Pakistani diplomat Shaista Suhrawardy Ikramullah influenced the drafting of the Declaration, especially with respect to women's rights, and played a role in the preparation of the 1951 Genocide Convention.

In 1982, the Iranian diplomat to the United Nations, who represented the country's newly installed Islamic republic, stated that the Declaration was "a secular understanding of the Judeo-Christian tradition" that could not be implemented by Muslims without conflict with sharīʿa law.

On 30 June 2000, member states of the Organisation of Islamic Cooperation, which represents the Muslim world's largest intergovernmental body, officially resolved to support the Cairo Declaration on Human Rights in Islam, an alternative document that says people have "freedom and right to a dignified life in accordance with the Islamic Shari'ah", without any discrimination on grounds of "race, colour, language, sex, religious belief, political affiliation, social status or other considerations". The Cairo Declaration is widely acknowledged to be a response to the UDHR, and uses similar universalist language, albeit derived solely from Islamic jurisprudence (fiqh).

Regarding the promulgation of the Cairo Declaration on Human Rights in Islam, T. Jeremy Gunn, Professor of Law and Political Science at the International University of Rabat in Morocco, has stated:

the twenty-two-member League of Arab States (Arab League)—each of whose members also belongs to the OIC and is majority-Muslim—created its own human rights instruments and institutions (based in Cairo) that set it apart from the international human rights regime. While the term "Arab" denotes an ethnicity and "Muslim" references a religion, all majority-Arab countries are also majority-Muslim countries, though the opposite does not hold. Indeed, the preponderance of Muslim-majority countries is not Arab. It has long been recognized that the Muslim-majority Arab world ranks particularly poorly with respect to human rights. According to the 2009 Arab Human Development Report, written by Arab experts for the United Nations Development Programme Regional Bureau for Arab States, "Arab states seem content to ratify certain international human rights treaties, but do not go so far as to recognize the role of international mechanisms in making human rights effective." [...] The resistance to implementation of international human rights standards in parts of the Muslim and Arab worlds is perhaps most salient with the panoply of rights related to religion. In terms of the UDHR, the core of the resistance is centered on issues of the right to freedom of thought, conscience, and religion (Article 18), prohibition of discrimination on the basis of religion (Article 2), and the prohibition of discrimination against women (preamble, Article 2, Article 16). The same resistance to universal standards, already present in the UDHR, continued in subsequent elaborations of human rights, including the International Covenant on Civil and Political Rights (ICCPR), the Convention on the Elimination of All Forms of Discrimination Against Women, the Convention on the Rights of the Child, and the 1981 Declaration on the Elimination of All Forms of Intolerance and of Discrimination Based on Religion or Belief.

A number of scholars in different fields have expressed concerns with the Declaration's alleged Western and secularist bias. Abdulaziz Sachedina observes that Muslims broadly agree with the Declaration's universalist premise, which is shared by Islam, but differ on specific contents, which many find "insensitive to particular Muslim cultural values, especially when it comes to speaking about individual rights in the context of collective and family values in Muslim society". However, he notes that most Muslim scholars, while opposing the inherently secular framework of the document, do respect and acknowledge some of its "foundations". Sachedina further argues that many Christians similarly criticized the Declaration for allegedly reflecting a secular and liberal bias in opposition to certain religious values.

Kazakh religious scholars Galym Zhussipbek and Zhanar Nagayeva have argued that the rejection or failed implementation of human rights in Muslim-majority countries and their seeming incompatibility with sharīʿa law originates from the current "epistemological crisis of conservative Islamic scholarship and Muslim mind", rooted in the centuries-old confinement of a role for reason within strict limits, and in the disappearance of rationalistic discursive Islamic theology (kalām) as a dynamic science from the Muslim world. Furthermore, they affirm the necessity of undertaking an epistemological reform in Islamic scholarship, which denotes the incorporation of international standards of human rights and justice into the epistemology and methodology of Islamic jurisprudence (usul al-fiqh).

Riffat Hassan, a Pakistani-born American Islamic feminist scholar and Muslim theologian, has argued:

What needs to be pointed out to those who uphold the Universal Declaration of Human Rights to be the highest, or sole, model, of a charter of equality and liberty for all human beings, is that given the Western origin and orientation of this Declaration, the "universality" of the assumptions on which it is based is—at the very least—problematic and subject to questioning. Furthermore, the alleged incompatibility between the concept of human rights and religion in general, or particular religions such as Islam, needs to be examined in an unbiased way.

Faisal Kutty, a Muslim Canadian human rights activist, opines that a "strong argument can be made that the current formulation of international human rights constitutes a cultural structure in which western society finds itself easily at home [...]. It is important to acknowledge and appreciate that other societies may have equally valid alternative conceptions of human rights." Irene Oh, director of the peace studies programme at Georgetown University, has argued that Muslim reservations towards some provisions of the UDHR, and the broader debate about the document's secular and Western bias, could be resolved through mutual dialogue grounded in comparative descriptive ethics.

=== "The Right to Refuse to Kill" ===
Groups such as Amnesty International and War Resisters International have advocated for "The Right to Refuse to Kill" to be added to the Universal Declaration, as has Seán MacBride, a former Assistant Secretary-General of the United Nations and Nobel Peace Prize laureate. War Resisters International has stated that the right to conscientious objection to military service is primarily derived from Article 18 of the UDHR, which preserves the right to freedom of thought, conscience, and religion. Some steps have been taken within the UN to make the right more explicit, with the Human Rights Council repeatedly affirming that Article 18 enshrines "the right of everyone to have conscientious objection to military service as a legitimate exercise of the right to freedom of thought, conscience and religion".

=== American Anthropological Association ===
The American Anthropological Association criticized the UDHR during its drafting process, warning that its definition of universal rights reflected a Western paradigm that was unfair to non-Western nations. They further argued that the West's history of colonialism and evangelism made them a problematic moral representative for the rest of the world. They proposed three notes for consideration with underlying themes of cultural relativism:

1. The individual realizes his personality through his culture, hence respect for individual differences entails a respect for cultural differences.
2. Respect for differences between cultures is validated by the scientific fact that no technique of qualitatively evaluating cultures has been discovered.
3. Standards and values are relative to the culture from which they derive so that any attempt to formulate postulates that grow out of the beliefs or moral codes of one culture must to that extent detract from the applicability of any Declaration of Human Rights to mankind as a whole.

This stance has gradually been abandoned by most anthropologists, many of whom today see universal human rights as an important way through which discrimination and oppression of cultural minorities can be reduced.

=== Bangkok Declaration ===
During the lead-up to the World Conference on Human Rights that was held in 1993; foreign ministers from Indonesia, Malaysia, Phllippines, Singapore and Thailand adopted the Bangkok Declaration, which reaffirms their governments' commitment to the principles of the United Nations Charter and the Universal Declaration of Human Rights. They stated their belief that human rights are interdependent and indivisible, and stressed the need for universality, objectivity, and non-selectivity of human rights. However, at the same time, they emphasized the principles of sovereignty and non-interference, calling for greater emphasis upon economic, social, and cultural rights, and in particular, the right to economic development by establishing international collaboration directives between the signatories. The Bangkok Declaration is considered to be a landmark expression of Asian values with respect to human rights, which offers an extended critique of human rights universalism.

== See also ==
=== Non-binding agreements ===
- Racial Equality Proposal (1919)
- Cairo Declaration on Human Rights in Islam (1990)
- Vienna Declaration and Programme of Action (1993)
- United Nations Millennium Declaration (2000)
- Yogyakarta Principles (2006)

=== International human rights law ===
- Fourth Geneva Convention (1949)
- European Convention on Human Rights (1952)
- Convention Relating to the Status of Refugees (1951)
- Convention on the Elimination of All Forms of Racial Discrimination (1969)
- International Covenant on Civil and Political Rights (1976)
- International Covenant on Economic, Social and Cultural Rights (1976)
- Convention on the Elimination of All Forms of Discrimination Against Women (1981)
- Convention on the Rights of the Child (1990)
- Charter of Fundamental Rights of the European Union (2000)
- Convention on the Rights of Persons with Disabilities (2007)

=== Other ===
- Human trafficking
- Slavery in international law
- Slave Trade Acts
- LGBT rights
- Declaration on Great Apes, an as-yet unsuccessful effort to extend some human rights to other great apes
- United Nations Prize in the Field of Human Rights
- Consent of the governed
- The Farewell Sermon (632 CE)
- Right to education
- Right to Internet access
