= Habib Malik =

Habib Malik is a retired associate professor of history and cultural studies at the Lebanese American University (LAU). His father Charles Malik was a leading figure in the drafting and adoption of the 1948 Universal Declaration of Human Rights.

== Life and work ==
Habib Malik was born in 1954 in Washington, D.C., and received his school education both in the United States and in Lebanon. His father, Charles Malik, was the first ambassador of Lebanon to the United States and is well known to have contributed to and shaping the Universal Declaration of Human Rights(10 December 1948), among other diplomatic services in his career. Habib's mother was Eva Habib Badr.

Habib earned his bachelor's degree in history from the American University of Beirut, then, after spending one year at Princeton University, he joined Harvard University for his graduate studies, where he earned his PhD in modern european intellectual history in 1985.

Habib taught intellectual/cultural as well as socio/political history at the American University of Beirut’s Off-Campus Program (OCP), and at the Catholic University of America in Washington D.C. He is currently an associate professor of history at the Lebanese American University (Byblos campus) and is chairing its newly emerging department of history.

He was a visiting fellow at the Washington Institute for Near East Policy in 1995 and 1996, and a visiting scholar at the American Enterprise Institute in 2003.

== Human Rights ==
Habib Malik is also a human rights activist and a founding member of the Foundation for Human and Humanitarian Rights in Lebanon. He is also the president and CEO of The Charles Malik Foundation (registered in the United States) that is in charge of editing and publishing Charles Malik's intellectual, diplomatic, and personal papers and legacy, and that guards his unpublished 50,000-page diary.

== Major publications ==
- Between Damascus and Jerusalem: Lebanon and Middle East Peace (2000, 2nd edition)
- Receiving Søren Kierkegaard: The Early Impact and Transmission of His Thought (1997)
- The Challenge of Human Rights: Charles Malik and the Universal Declaration (ed.) (2001)
- The Systems of Whitehead's Metaphysics(co-ed. with Tony E. Nasrallah)(2016)
- On the Philosophical Thought of Charles Malik(co-ed. with Tony E. Nasrallah)(2018)

He has also published many articles, essays, and chapters in books on a variety of topics that include human rights, political Islam, Middle Eastern Christian communities, democracy in the Arab world, Kierkegaard’s Arab reception, and also a chapter in Finding God at Harvard.
