= Tripoli Evangelical School =

Location
- Tripoli; Lebanon
- Coordinates: 34°26′27″N 35°50′38″E

Information
- Type: Private
- Motto: We care, we share, we dare.
- Established: 1873
- Principal: Dr. Jamal Bittar
- Gender: Co-educational
- Colour(s): Yellow and green
- Website: tes.edu.lb

Tripoli Evangelical School for Boys and Girls is a K-12 private American school founded in 1873. The school is located in Tripoli in North Lebanon. It is one of the oldest schools in the country and one of the first pre-higher education institutions in the Middle East. Founded as an American Presbyterian missionary, the school is also part of the National Evangelical Synod of Syria and Lebanon.

== History ==
Tripoli Evangelical School was formed by the American Presbyterian missionary movement in the Middle East during the Ottoman Empire in 1873. The school was originally named the Tripoli School for Girls and used to be located in Al Rahibat street. In 1928 the school relocated to its current location in Zahrieh street, and shortly after, began teaching nothing more than a handful of students with a curriculum limited to Arabic, History, Geography, Housekeeping, some sciences, and English.

The boys school was later founded in 1904 under the same movement. William Nelson was its first president, whose tremendous efforts raised subsidies for the establishment and the construction of the institute in Al Kibba, in Tripoli. The school's vision has always been to nurture its students with a comprehensive upbringing having the body, mind and spirit working together for the service of God and the nation to their best.

As the days past by, the curriculum developed to accommodate the increasing number of students and to prepare them for the systematic Lebanese and foreign education. In 1959, the National Evangelical Synod took over the management of the institutions in Syria and Lebanon. Local and national managers were appointed to these institutions. The management of the Tripoli School for Girls was entrusted with Ms. Widad Deebo, which was the first Lebanese president of the school. The same was done for the Tripoli School for Boys, to which management was appointed to Sheikh Ansalmo Deeb.

=== The Merger ===
In 1976, due to the outbreak of the civil war in Lebanon, it became impossible for male students to attend their school in Al Kibba. The National Evangelical Synod decided to send the boys and girls to the same school on Zahriyi street and form a co-educational school. Arrangements were made to suit the two genders and the school was re-formed as Tripoli Evangelical School for Girls and Boys under the supervision of Widad Deebo.

=== Today ===
Today, the school is still part of the Evangelical schools in Lebanon, including Sidon Evangelical School, Zahlé Evangelical School, and The Lebanese Evangelical School in Ain Zhalta.

== Campus ==
The school campus is located on Zahrieh street, in Tripoli, Lebanon. It consists of buildings which house the school's four departments: Preschool, Elementary, Intermediate, and Secondary.

== Notable alumni ==
- Charles Malik, philosopher and human rights activist, founded the Human Rights Division in the United Nations.
