= John Peters Humphrey =

Canadian legal scholar (1905–1995)

John Peters Humphrey OC OQ
- John Peters Humphrey
- Born: John Thomas Peters Humphrey; April 30, 1905; Hampton, New Brunswick, Canada
- Died: March 14, 1995 (aged 89); Montreal, Quebec, Canada
- Education: McGill University
- Organization: United Nations
- Notable work: First draft of the Universal Declaration on Human Rights
- Spouses: Jeanne Godreau; Margaret Kunstler
- Awards: UN Humanitarian Award

John Peters Humphrey OC OQ (April 30, 1905 – March 14, 1995) was a Canadian legal scholar, jurist, and human rights advocate. He is most famous as the principal author of the first draft of the Universal Declaration of Human Rights (UDHR), a foundational document in international human rights law adopted by the United Nations General Assembly in 1948.

Humphrey's contributions were recognized with honors including the Order of Canada (1974), the National Order of Quebec (1985), and the UN Human Rights Prize (1988).

== Childhood, education and academic career ==
John Thomas Peters Humphrey was born to Frank M. Humphrey, a shoe merchant, and Nellie Peters on April 30, 1905, in Hampton, New Brunswick. His childhood was wracked by tragedy. His father died of cancer in June 1906, when Humphrey was 13 months old. At the age of six, Humphrey suffered a severe accident while playing with fire, causing severe burns to his left arm and resulting in it being amputated the following year. Humphrey attended a boarding school where he endured teasing from other students; it is claimed that this was influential in building his character and compassion. His mother also died of cancer in 1916, when he was 11 years old, leaving him an orphan.

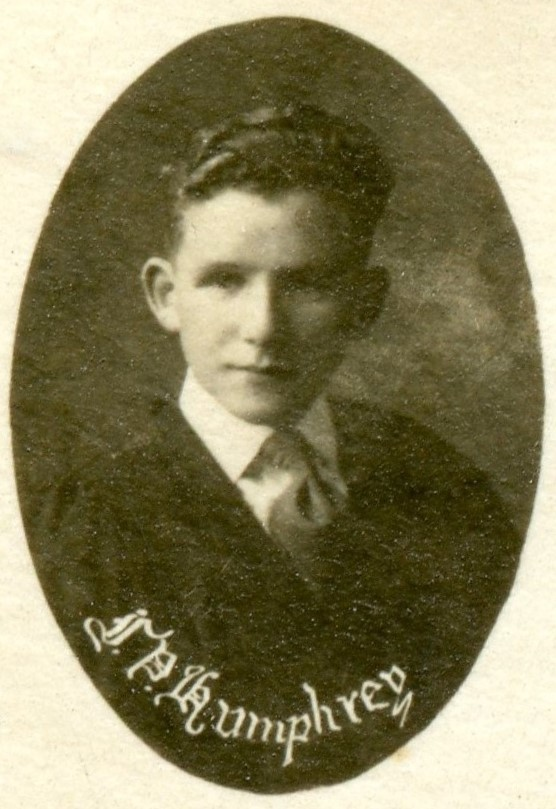
Class photo, Mount Allison University, ca 1924

John Humphrey applied to Mount Allison University at the age of 15 from the Rothesay Collegiate School and was accepted. He transferred to McGill University and lived with his sister Ruth who was a teacher in Montreal, Quebec. Humphrey graduated from McGill in 1925 where he was awarded a Bachelor of Commerce degree from the School of Commerce, part of the Desautels Faculty of Management. He promptly enrolled in a Bachelor of Arts and Bachelor of Law at McGill, graduating in 1927 and 1929 respectively. Upon graduation, Humphrey was awarded a fellowship to study in Paris, sailing from Montreal on the RMS Aurania. He met fellow passenger Jeanne Godreau while on board and they were married in Paris shortly after arriving.

Humphrey returned to Montreal after the fellowship to practice law for five years before accepting a teaching position as a professor at McGill; he also enrolled in a Master of Law program, specializing in international law. During the 1930s Humphrey was considered a renaissance man with the majority of his interests in education, the arts and humanities.

While teaching at McGill in the early 1940s, Humphrey met Henri Laugier, a refugee from France who was working on behalf of the Free French. In 1943, Laugier moved to Algeria to teach at the University of Algiers and later became the Assistant Secretary-General of the United Nations.

While at McGill University, John Peters Humphrey founded the McGill Debating Union, one of the world's most successful and prominent debate societies.

== Universal Declaration of Human Rights ==
In 1946, Assistant Secretary-General to the United Nations, Henri Laugier, appointed John Peters Humphrey as the first Director of the United Nations Division of Human Rights, within the United Nations Secretariat.

Humphrey was a principal drafter of the Universal Declaration of Human Rights. After consulting with the executive group of the Commission, chaired by Eleanor Roosevelt, Professor Humphrey prepared the first preliminary draft of what was to become the Universal Declaration of Human Rights.

The draft underwent subsequent revisions (see Drafting of the Universal Declaration of Human Rights), after which the final text was unanimously adopted by the General Assembly on December 10, 1948, proclaimed by Roosevelt as "the international Magna Carta of all humankind."

== Career in the United Nations ==
Humphrey remained with the UN for 20 years. During this period, he oversaw the implementation of 67 international conventions and the constitutions of dozens of countries. He worked in areas including the freedom of the press, status of women, and racial discrimination. In 1988, on the 40th anniversary of the Declaration, the UN Human Rights award was bestowed on Professor Humphrey.

In 1963, he proposed the idea of a United Nations High Commissioner for Human Rights. While the idea was initially received quite positively, it was only after more than thirty years, under Secretary-General Dr. Boutros Boutros-Ghali, that the office became a reality.

== Later life ==
Humphrey retired from the UN in 1966 to resume his teaching career at McGill University. He remained active in the promotion of human rights in Canada and internationally for the rest of his life.

He served as a director of the International League for Human Rights; served as a member of the Royal Commission on the Status of Women; a member of the team that launched Amnesty International's chapter in Canada; and, with colleagues from McGill University, was instrumental in creating the Canadian Human Rights Foundation, now renamed Equitas -International Centre for Human Rights Education. He took part in a number of international commissions of inquiry, including a mission to the Philippines investigating human rights violations under Ferdinand Marcos and the International Commission of Inquiry into the 1932-33 Famine in Ukraine. At the UN, he sought compensation for Korean women forced to act as sex slaves. He also campaigned with the War Amps for reparations for Canadian prisoners of war under Japanese captivity.

In 1974, he spoke in opposition of Bill 22, the Quebec Language Law. He testified on July 19, 1974 that English was also an official language in the province, despite the proposed law. Together with Frank R. Scott, Irwin Cotler and four other McGill professors, he said:

Section 1, which provides that French is 'the official language of the province of Quebec,' is misleading in that it suggests that English is not also an official language in Quebec, which it is by virtue of Section 133 of the BNA Act and the federal Official Languages Act.... No legislation in the National Assembly proclaiming French the sole official language in the province can affect these bilingual areas protected by the BNA Act.

Humphrey's wife Jeanne died in 1980. He later married Montreal physician Margaret Kunstler, herself a widow.

Humphrey died in Montreal on March 14, 1995 at the age of 89.

== Honours and recognition ==
Among his many honours, Professor Humphrey was made an Officer of the Order of Canada in 1974, "in recognition of his contributions to legal scholarship and his world-wide reputation in the field of human rights".

In 1985, he was made an Officer of the Ordre nationale du Québec.

The John Peters Humphrey Model United Nations is held in his honour every May in Fredericton, New Brunswick..

Since 1988, the McGill University Faculty of Law has held the John P. Humphrey Lectureship in Human Rights, an annual lecture on the role of international law and organizations in the worldwide protection of human rights.

In September 1998, Nelson Mandela unveiled a commemorative plaque to Humphrey at the Human Rights Monument, Ottawa, as part of Canada's tribute on the fiftieth anniversary of the Declaration.

A postage stamp to Humphrey was issued in 1998 by Canada Post, marking the 50th anniversary of the Declaration. It was issued in Montreal, where he graduated in law, practiced, and taught.

The John Humphrey Freedom Award, presented by the Canadian human rights group Rights & Democracy, is awarded each year to organizations and individuals around the world for exceptional achievement in the promotion of human rights and democratic development.

In June 2008, a memorial to Dr. Humphrey was unveiled in his hometown of Hampton, New Brunswick. The memorial, entitled the CREDO monument was sculpted by Hooper Studios and was commissioned by the Hampton John Peters Humphrey Foundation. It is located just a few hundred yards from his childhood home, consists of a UN-style wooden bench with a young and old Humphrey seated. Several brass doves sit on the end of the bench, which sits beside two tall stone plinths, one of which has several articles from the Universal Declaration of Human Rights carved into it in English, French and Maliseet. The memorial sits on the front lawn of the Hampton Town Hall, which is housed in the former county court house in the centre of town.

The wooden sculpture has been repaired since its unveiling, but ongoing deterioration prompted an effort to preserve it in bronze. With the permission of the original artists, the wooden memorial statue was bronzed and the wooden bench was replaced with stone. This project was completed on April 30, 2023.

== Bibliography ==
- Humphrey, John Peters, Human Rights and the United Nations: A Great Adventure (New York: Transnational Publishers, 1984) (autobiography)

== See also ==
- List of civil rights leaders
- List of peace activists

== Sources ==
- On the Edge of Greatness: the Diaries of John Humphrey, First Director of the United Nations Division of Human Rights, 4 volumes. Edited by A.J. Hobbins and published as Fontanus Monographs 4, 9, 12 and 13. Montreal, McGill-Queen's University Press. 1995-2001. ISBN 0-7735-1458-9, ISBN 0-7735-1456-2, ISBN 0-7735-1454-6, ISBN 0-7735-1383-3.
- Hobbins, A.J. and Steward, A. "Humphrey and the quest for compensation: Individual claims against States and the creation of new international law." Canadian Yearbook of International Law, 2003. XLI (2004). pp. 187–223.
- Hobbins, A.J. "Humphrey and the High Commissioner: the Genesis of the Office of the UN High Commissioner for Human Rights." Journal of the History of International Law. III (2001), pp. 38–74
- Hobbins, A.J. "Mentor and Protégé: Percy Corbett’s relationship with John Peters Humphrey." Canadian Yearbook of International Law, 1999. XXXVII (2000), pp. 3–56.
- Hobbins, A.J. "René Cassin and the Daughter of Time: the First Draft of the Universal Declaration of Human Rights". Fontanus II (1989) pp. 7 26.
- Hobbins, A.J. and Boyer, D. "Seeking Historical Truth: the International Commission of Inquiry into the 1932-33 Famine in Ukraine. Dalhousie Law Journal. XXIV (2001), pp. 139-191
- King, J and Hobbins, A.J.. "Hammarskjöld and Human Rights: the Deflation of the UN Human Rights Programme, 1953-1961." Journal of the History of International Law. V (2003), pp. 337–386.
