= Third session of the United Nations General Assembly =

- 21 September 1948 – 18 May 1949 3rd session 3rd general debate
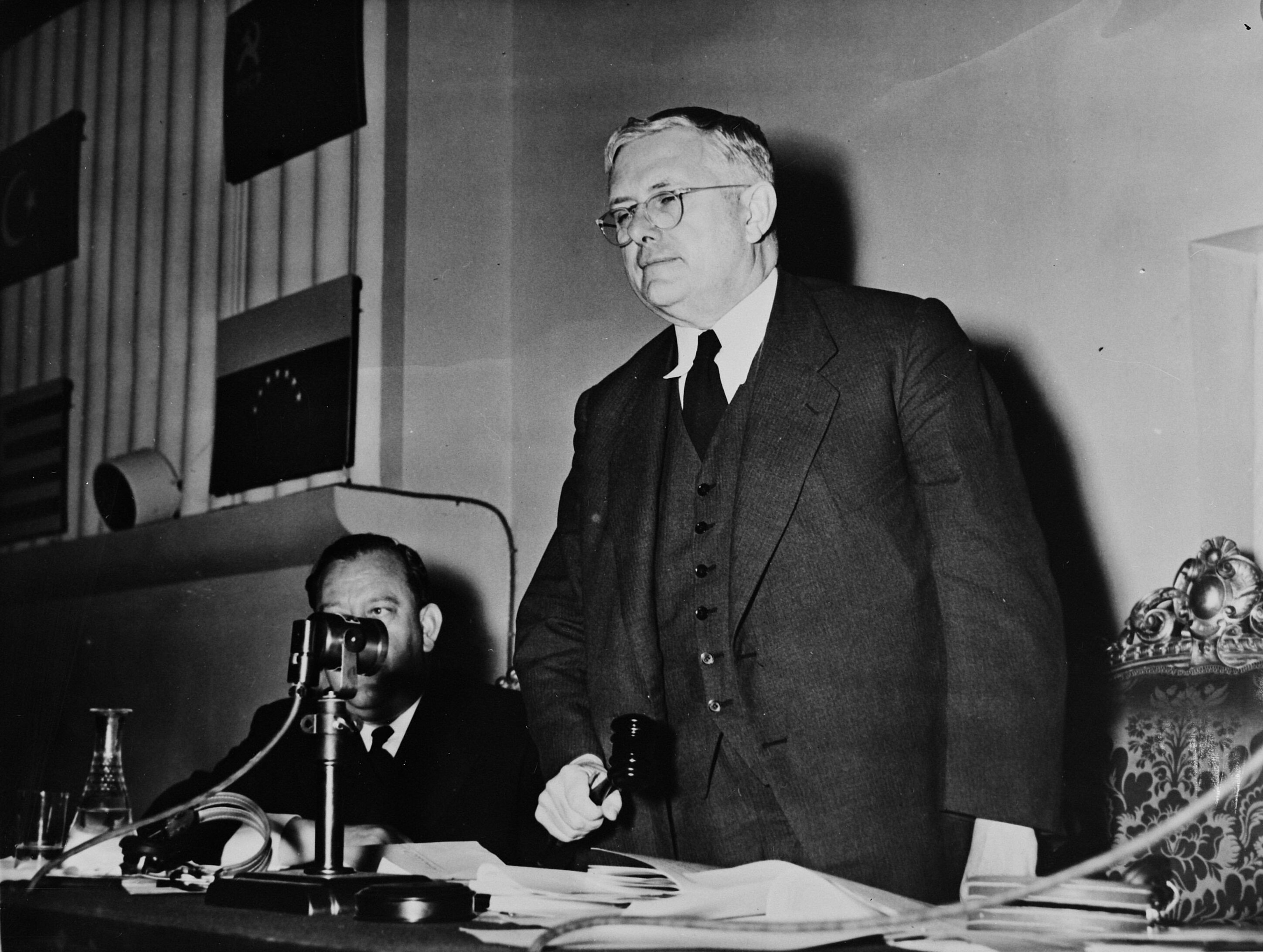
- President of the third General Assembly, H. V. Evatt, overseeing a session in Paris on 23 September 1948
- Host country: United Nations
- Venues: Palais de Chaillot; New York City Building
- Participants: United Nations Member States
- President: Herbert Vere Evatt
- Secretary-General: Trygve Lie

The third regular session of the United Nations General Assembly was held from 21 September to 12 December 1948 in Paris, France, and from 5 April to 18 May 1949 in New York City, United States. The permanent Headquarters of the United Nations did not yet exist, so sessions of the General Assembly were convened in various cities; this was the first one to be held in Continental Europe.

The president of the United Nations General Assembly for both parts of the third session was Herbert Vere Evatt of Australia.

== Prelude ==
The session was taking place but three years after the conclusion of World War II, a conflict so vast and impactful that it had convinced the United States and other nations to give collective security another try after the failures of the interwar period, and people were hopeful this time it would work. By 1948, the tensions of the early Cold War period were already becoming apparent.

On Sunday, 19 September, two days prior to the opening of the session, church bells were rung and special services held in congregations of various faiths, praying for the success of the General Assembly meetings. Such events were held in cities and towns across the United States and in parts of Canada. Similar ceremonies were also held in both Western and Eastern Europe, including in Belgium, France, Czechoslovakia, and Poland, as well as other parts of the world.

In many of the services, one particular prayer, written anonymously, was said, part of which read:

Especially do we pray for the Assembly of the United Nations, opening in Paris. Give to men and women gathered there a sense of Thy providence and a knowledge that the good of all people must come before the good of any single person, race, or nation. Amen.

== Paris part ==
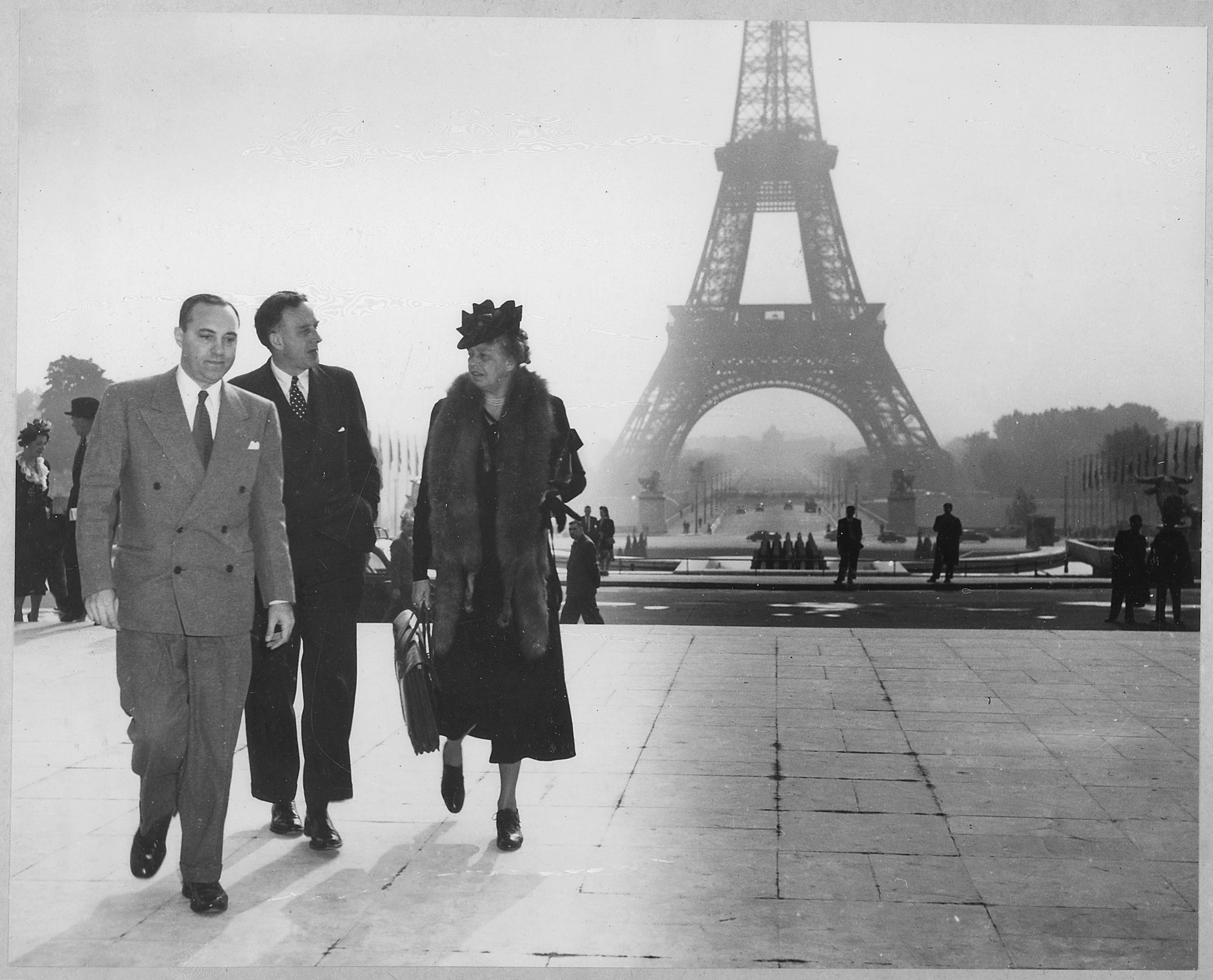
Eleanor Roosevelt, with American delegates Ernest A. Gross and Philip Jessup, during the second day of the assembly session

Representatives met in Paris from 21 September to 12 December 1948 to convene the third session. It was hosted at the Palais de Chaillot in the 16th arrondissement of Paris.

In all there were 618 different meetings of the assembly and various committees at the Paris session. Initially there were negotiations over whether the Eastern Bloc would have adequate representation on the United Nations General Committee and other such UN bodies. The most important achievements of the Paris session were the ratifications of two foundational and essential documents, the Universal Declaration of Human Rights and the Convention on the Prevention and Punishment of the Crime of Genocide. The general assembly vote on the first was 48–0 with 8 absentions, and the vote on the second was 50–0 with 0 abstentions. Otherwise the Paris session was marked by disagreements between the West and the Eastern Bloc, with Andrey Vyshinsky, the head of the delegation from the Soviet Union, criticizing John Foster Dulles, the acting chair of the United States delegation. In the end, the Soviet Union expressed frustration that none of its own proposals had passed. The Paris session also addressed the situation on the Korean peninsula by declaring, via a 48–6 margin, the Republic of Korea to be the only legitimate government there.

== New York part ==
The second part of the third session took place in New York City from 5 April to 18 May 1949. It was held at the New York City Building within Flushing Meadows Park in the borough of Queens. Many of the committee sessions were held just outside the city in the village of Lake Success. As a result, the naming of this part of the session is often referred to be both at Flushing Meadows Park and Lake Success.

The most significant action of this part of the session was United Nations General Assembly Resolution 273, allowing the admission of the State of Israel into the United Nations. The general assembly voted 37–12 with 9 abstentions. Otherwise the overall session ended on an inconclusive note, with several questions regarding the disposition of Italian colonies left for the next session.

== See also ==
- List of UN General Assembly sessions
- List of General debates of the United Nations General Assembly
