= United Nations General Assembly Resolution 217 (III) =

United Nations General Assembly Resolution 217A was adopted on December 10, 1948, to ratify the Universal Declaration of Human Rights.

The resolution was adopted by a majority of 48 countries from among the 58 members of the United Nations at that time; however 8 abstained.

== Voting results ==
The result of the voting was the following:

For	Abstentions
Afghanistan	Byelorussian SSR
Argentina	Czechoslovakia
Australia	Poland
Belgium	Saudi Arabia
Bolivia	Ukrainian SSR
Brazil	South Africa
Burma	USSR
Canada	Yugoslavia
Chile	
China	
Colombia	
Costa Rica	
Cuba	
Denmark	
Dominican Republic	
Ecuador	
Egypt	
El Salvador	
Ethiopia	
France	
Greece	
Guatemala	
Haiti	
Iceland	
India	
Iran	
Iraq	
Lebanon	
Liberia	
Luxembourg	
Mexico	
Netherlands	
New Zealand	
Nicaragua	
Norway	
Pakistan	
Panama	
Paraguay	
Peru	
Philippines	
Siam	
Sweden	
Syria	
Turkey	
United Kingdom	
United States	
Uruguay	
Venezuela	
