= Bedia Afnan =

Iraqi diplomat

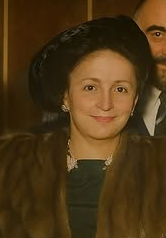
- Born: Iraq
- Occupation: Government Official
- Known for: Iraqi Permanent Mission Adviser
- Notable work: Represented Iraq to UN GA 3rd Committee

H. Bedia Afnan (بديعة أفنان) was a former Adviser to the Iraqi Permanent Mission at the United Nations. She represented Iraq in the United Nations General Assembly's Third Committee (Social, Cultural, and Humanitarian) and on the Commission on the Status of Women. In this role, she was "one of the delegates most directly responsible" for the inclusion of the International Covenant on Civil and Political Rights' Article 3 (Part I) which guarantees "the equal right of men and women to the enjoyment of all civil and political rights" enshrined therein.

In the 1950s, she served as the press attaché for the Embassy of Iraq in Washington, D.C., and maintained a friendly relationship with Eleanor Roosevelt.
