= P. C. Chang =

Chinese philosopher & diplomat (1892–1957)

Peng Chun Chang
- 張彭春
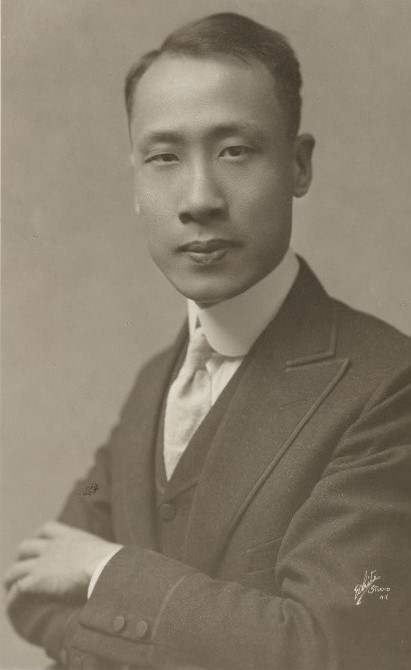
- Born: April 22, 1892; Tianjin, China
- Died: July 19, 1957 (aged 65); Nutley, New Jersey, United States
- Other name: P. C. Chang
- Education: Clark University (BA); Columbia University (PhD)
- Occupations: academic, philosopher, playwright, activist, and diplomat

Peng Chun Chang, commonly known as P. C. Chang (simplified Chinese: 张彭春; traditional Chinese: 張彭春; pinyin: Zhāng Péngchūn; Wade–Giles: Chang^{1} P'eng^{2}-ch'un^{1}; 1892–1957), was a Chinese academic, philosopher, playwright, human rights activist, and diplomat. He was born in Tianjin, China, and died at his home in Nutley, New Jersey.

== Biography ==
Chang was born in Tianjin, China in April 1892. He was the younger brother of Chang Po-ling, the founder and President of Nankai University. Peng Chun earned his Bachelor of Arts at Clark University, Worcester, Massachusetts in 1913, and a PhD from Columbia University, where he studied with the eminent philosopher and educator, John Dewey. During his time as a student, Chang studied literature and theater. He produced multiple plays, including the original version of Hua Mulan. After graduating, he returned to China and became a professor teaching and performing theater at Nankai University in Tianjin, where he also taught philosophy and became a notable scholar of Chinese traditional drama. Many of his students became famous playwrights. He became a member of the circle of Mei Lanfang, foremost interpreter of Peking Opera. In 1930, he directed a tour of Chinese Classical Theater to North America, and in 1935 to the Soviet Union.

After the invasion of China by Japan in 1937, Chang joined the anti-Japanese resistance at Nankai. When the Japanese arrived there, he fled by disguising himself as a woman. He was engaged by the Chinese government to assist in promoting awareness in Europe and America of the Nanking Massacre. Chang later taught at the University of Chicago.

Chang became a full-time diplomat in 1942, serving as China's representative in Turkey. He was an enthusiastic promoter of Chinese culture. While in Turkey he delivered lectures on the reciprocal influences and commonalities between the Islamic and Chinese cultures, and on the relationship between Confucianism and Islam. Following the war, Chang was a Chinese representative to the conference which produced the Universal Declaration on Human Rights. Chang resigned from the UN in 1952 because of a worsening heart condition and died in 1957.

== Philosophy and activities on human rights ==
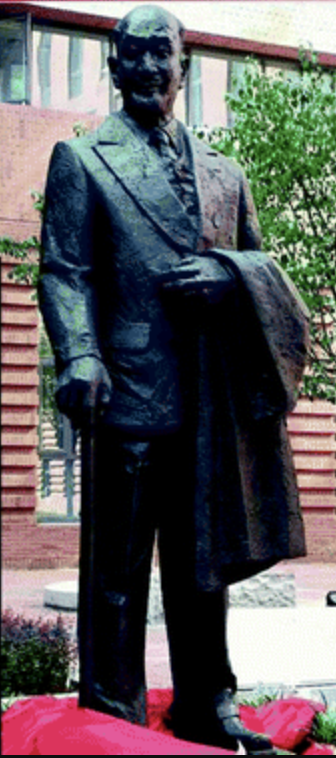
P.C. Chang's statue at Nankai University

Chang has been described as a renaissance man. He was a playwright, musician, diplomat; a lover of traditional Chinese literature and music and someone who knew both Western and Islamic culture. His philosophy was strongly based on the teachings of Confucius. At the first meeting of United Nations Economic and Social Council he quoted Mencius stating that ECOSOC's highest aim should be to "nourish people with goodness" so that the world can be subdued. He also argued that many influential western thinkers on rights were guided by Chinese ideas. "In the 18th century, when progressive ideas with respect to human rights had been first put forward in Europe, translations of Chinese philosophers had been known to, and had inspired, such thinkers as Voltaire, Quesnay and Diderot in their humanistic revolt against feudalism," he told the UN General Assembly in 1948.

On the Universal Declaration of Human Rights drafting committee, he served both as an effective Asian delegate and also as a mediator when the negotiations reached a stalemate. He served as Vice-Chairman of the original UN Commission on Human Rights, meaning he was next in position to the chairman Eleanor Roosevelt, and was also the Republic of China delegate to its committee, playing a pivotal role in the drafting of the Universal Declaration of Human Rights (UDHR) in 1948. His work on the UDHR reflects the influence of traditional Chinese values.

Fellow delegate Charles Malik, the Lebanese philosopher-diplomat, who was the rapporteur compared to Vice-Chairman Chang, did not share the same ideals of universal human rights, which to him was more Western than universal, and instead he heatedly debated what they were and how they could be described in an international document. Another member of the committee confided to his diary that Chang and Malik "hate[d] each other." Yet by most accounts, Chang and Malik were the philosophical leaders of the deliberations. Malik argued for conservative Christian views, while Chang argued that the modern world should pay heed to international views, and frequently brought up Chinese philosophers such as Mencius not because they were Chinese, but because their ideas had universal validity. In a speech, Malik stated that there were too many people to thank, but singled out Chang, who was considered a renaissance man for his work in directing plays, diplomacy, philosophy, and other intellectual pursuits, and acknowledged Chang's ideas as the philosophical backbone of the declaration.

Chang contributed to all thirty articles of the UDHR. The articles which include his most substantial contributions are Article 25 (emphasizing a decent standard of living), Article 23 (the right to work), Article 26 (the right to the development of the full human personality and the right to an education), Article 18 (freedom of religion, the right not to be discriminated against, and equal access to public services), Article 1 (articulating the fundamental value of humanity), and Article 27 (culture and science). Chang argued strongly in favor of Article 27's wording ("Everyone has the right freely to participate in the cultural life of the community, to enjoy the arts and to share in scientific advancement and its benefits") because he viewed it as critical that the UDHR should not just guarantee the consumption of culture but also guarantee individuals' participation in the creation of culture.
