= List of black Nobel laureates =

The Nobel Prize is an annual, international prize first awarded in 1901 for achievements in Physics, Chemistry, Physiology or Medicine, Literature, and Peace, with an associated prize in Economics awarded since 1969. As of November 2022, Nobel Prizes had been awarded to 954 individuals, of whom 17 were black recipients (1.7% of the 954 individual recipients).

Black people have received awards in three of the six award categories: twelve in Peace (70.6% of the black recipients), four in Literature (23.5%), and one in Economics (5.9%). The first black recipient, Ralph Bunche, was awarded the Nobel Peace Prize in 1950. W. Arthur Lewis became the first black recipient of a Nobel Prize in one of the sciences when he was awarded the Nobel Prize in Economic Sciences in 1979. The most recent black laureate, Abdulrazak Gurnah, was awarded the Nobel Prize in Literature in 2021.

Among the black Nobel laureates, three served as heads of state or government of their respective countries upon receiving the Nobel Prize, while one was awarded the prize before taking office. Those include Barack Obama of the United States and Ellen Johnson Sirleaf of Liberia, who were presidents, along with Abiy Ahmed of Ethiopia, who was prime minister; all of them were awarded the Peace Prize. In addition, Nelson Mandela of South Africa became a Nobel Peace laureate before being elected president.

== Literature ==
Four black people have been awarded the Nobel Prize in Literature.

Year	Image	Laureate	Country	Comment
1986		Wole Soyinka	Nigeria	First black man to win the Nobel Prize for Literature
1992		Derek Walcott	Saint Lucia	
1993		Toni Morrison	United States	First black woman to win a Nobel Prize
2021		Abdulrazak Gurnah	United Kingdom	Gurnah moved to the United Kingdom in the 1960s as a refugee following the Zanzibar Revolution

== Peace ==
12 black people have been awarded the Nobel Peace Prize.

Year	Image	Laureate	Country	Comment
1950		Ralph Bunche	United States	First black person to win a Nobel Prize
1960		Albert John Luthuli	South Africa	First black African to win a Nobel Prize
1964		Martin Luther King Jr.	United States	Youngest African American to win a Nobel Prize, at age 35
1984		Desmond Tutu	South Africa	
1993		Nelson Mandela	South Africa	
2001		Kofi Annan	Ghana	
2004		Wangari Maathai	Kenya	First environmentalist to win the Nobel Peace Prize
2009		Barack Obama	United States	
2011		Ellen Johnson Sirleaf	Liberia	
2011		Leymah Gbowee	Liberia	
2018		Denis Mukwege	Democratic Republic of the Congo	
2019		Abiy Ahmed	Ethiopia	Resolved a conflict with between Eritrea and Ethiopia, which lasted for lasted for 2 years, 1 month, and 12 days.

== Economics ==
One black person has been awarded the Nobel Memorial Prize in Economics.

Year	Image	Laureate	Country	Comment
1979		W. Arthur Lewis	Saint Lucia	First black person to win a Nobel Memorial Prize in Economic Sciences; first West Indian to win a Nobel Memorial Prize in Economic Sciences

== See also ==
- List of Nobel laureates
- List of African Nobel laureates
- List of Asian Nobel laureates
- List of Latino and Hispanic Nobel laureates
- List of Christian Nobel laureates
- List of Jewish Nobel laureates
