= List of Latin American Nobel laureates =

Latin American Nobel laureates

The Nobel Prize is an annual, international prize first awarded in 1901 for achievements in Physics, Chemistry, Physiology or Medicine, Literature, and Peace, with an associated prize in Economics awarded since 1969. As of October 2025, Nobel Prizes had been awarded to 965 individuals, of whom 21 (Note: Including Peter Medawar, who was born in Brazil, Friedrich Bergius who lived in Argentina, and Juan Ramón Jiménez, who settled and died in Puerto Rico.) were Latin American recipients (2.12% of the 990 individual recipients).

Latin Americans have received awards in four of the six award categories: seven in Peace (33.3% of the Latin recipients), seven in Literature (33.3%), four in Physiology or Medicine (19%), and three in Chemistry (14.2%). The first Latin American recipient, Carlos Saavedra Lamas, was awarded the Peace Prize in 1936. The most recent, María Corina Machado, was awarded the Peace Prize in 2025.

Among the Latin American laureates, two served as heads of state or government of their respective countries upon receiving the Nobel Prize. Those include Óscar Arias Sánchez of Costa Rica and Juan Manuel Santos of Colombia, who were presidents; both of them were awarded the Peace Prize.

Since the death of Mario Vargas Llosa on 23 April 2025, there are no other living Latin American laureates in the other categories except for five Nobel Peace Prize laureates.

== Laureates ==
Number of Latin American Nobel laureates by country (Note: The United States is included to note the Chicanos – people of Mexican descent who were born in or live in the United States. Likewise, to note other Americans with Latin American descent.)
Category	(Argentina)	(Bolivia)	(Brazil)	(Chile)	(Colombia)	(Costa Rica)	(Cuba)	(Dominican Republic)	(Ecuador)	(El Salvador)	(Guatemala)	(Honduras)	(Mexico)	(Nicaragua)	(Panama)	(Paraguay)	(Peru)	(Puerto Rico)	(United States)	(Uruguay)	(Venezuela)	
Medicine	2		1 (Note: Medawar acquired a Brazilian citizenship by birth as dictated by the Brazilian nationality law (jus soli). He left the country, together with his parents, at the age of 14 to finish high school in the United Kingdom. At age 18, he renounced his Brazilian citizenship when he refused to be drafted in the military and after his appeal for exemption was denied. When the Nobel Committee awarded him the Prize, he was acknowledged as a British citizen. It was only after his death when he was recognized also as being a Brazilian Nobel laureate.)																		1	4
Physics																						
Chemistry	2 (Note: Due to World War II, Bergius fled to Argentina, where he worked as an adviser to the Ministry of Industry. He died in Buenos Aires on 30 March 1949, and is buried in the Cementerio Alemán next to La Chacarita Cemetery. Though, he remained a German citizen, he is regarded as an "honorary Argentinian".)												1									3
Literature				2	1						1		1				1	1 (Note: Though Jimenez remained a Spanish citizen throughout his life, he is regarded an "honorary Puerto Rican" having lived, worked, and died in San Juan with his wife Zenobia Camprubí, who was of Puerto Rican heritage. He was a Professor of Spanish Literature and Poet-in-Residence at the University of Puerto Rico.)				7
Peace	2				1	1					1		1								1	7
Economics																						
Total	6		1	2	2	1					2		3				1	1			2	21

Year	Image	Laureate	Born	Died	Citation
Physiology or Medicine
1947		Bernardo Houssay	10 April 1887; Buenos Aires, Argentina	21 September 1971; Buenos Aires, Argentina	"for his discovery of the part played by the hormone of the anterior pituitary lobe in the metabolism of sugar" (awarded jointly with Carl Ferdinand Cori and Gerty Radnitz-Cori)
1960		Peter Medawar	28 February 1915; Petrópolis, Rio de Janeiro, Brazil	2 October 1987; London, United Kingdom	"for discovery of acquired immunological tolerance." (awarded jointly with Frank Macfarlane Burnet)
1980		Baruj Benacerraf	29 October 1920; Caracas, Venezuela	2 August 2011; Jamaica Plain, Massachusetts, United States	"for their discoveries concerning genetically determined structures on the cell surface that regulate immunological reactions" (awarded jointly with Jean Dausset and George Davis Snell)
1984		César Milstein	8 October 1927; Bahía Blanca, Buenos Aires, Argentina	24 March 2002; Cambridge, England	"for theories concerning the specificity in development and control of the immune system and the discovery of the principle for production of monoclonal antibodies" (awarded jointly with Niels Kaj Jerne and Georges J. F. Köhler)
Chemistry
1931		Friedrich Bergius	11 October 1884; Wrocław, Poland	30 March 1949; Buenos Aires, Argentina	"in recognition of their contributions to the invention and development of chemical high pressure methods" (awarded jointly with Carl Bosch)
1970		Luis Federico Leloir	6 September 1906; Paris, France	2 December 1987; Buenos Aires, Argentina	"for his discovery of sugar nucleotides and their role in the biosynthesis of carbohydrates"
1995		Mario Molina	19 March 1943; Mexico City, Mexico	7 October 2020; Mexico City, Mexico	"for their work in atmospheric chemistry, particularly concerning the formation and decomposition of ozone" (awarded jointly with Paul J. Crutzen and F. Sherwood Rowland)
Literature
1945		Gabriela Mistral	7 April 1889; Vicuña, Elqui, Chile	10 January 1957; Hempstead, New York, United States	"for her lyric poetry which, inspired by powerful emotions, has made her name a symbol of the idealistic aspirations of the entire Latin American world"
1967		Juan Ramón Jiménez	23 December 1881; Moguer, Huelva, Spain	29 May 1958; San Juan, Puerto Rico (Note: Territory of the United States of America.)	"for his lyrical poetry, which in Spanish language constitutes an example of high spirit and artistical purity"
1967		Miguel Ángel Asturias	19 October 1899; Guatemala City, Guatemala	9 June 1974; Madrid, Spain	"for his vivid literary achievement, deep-rooted in the national traits and traditions of Indian peoples of Latin America"
1971		Pablo Neruda	12 July 1904; Parral, Linares, Chile	23 September 1973; Santiago, Chile	"for a poetry that with the action of an elemental force brings alive a continent's destiny and dreams"
1982		Gabriel García Márquez	6 March 1927; Aracataca, Magdalena, Colombia	17 April 2014; Mexico City, Mexico	"for his novels and short stories, in which the fantastic and the realistic are combined in a richly composed world of imagination, reflecting a continent's life and conflicts"
1990		Octavio Paz	31 March 1914; Mexico City, Mexico	19 April 1998; Mexico City, Mexico	"for impassioned writing with wide horizons, characterized by sensuous intelligence and humanistic integrity"
2010		Mario Vargas Llosa	28 March 1936; Arequipa, Peru	13 April 2025; Lima, Peru	"for his cartography of structures of power and his trenchant images of the individual's resistance, revolt, and defeat"
Peace
1936		Carlos Saavedra Lamas	1 November 1878; Buenos Aires, Argentina	5 May 1959; Buenos Aires, Argentina	"for his role as father of the Argentine Antiwar Pact of 1933, which he also used as a means to mediate peace between Paraguay and Bolivia in 1935"
1980		Adolfo Pérez Esquivel	26 November 1931; Buenos Aires, Argentina	(aged 94)	"for being a source of inspiration to repressed people, especially in Latin America"
1982		Alfonso García Robles	20 March 1911; Zamora, Michoacán, Mexico	2 September 1991; Mexico City, Mexico	"for their work for disarmament and nuclear and weapon-free zones" (awarded jointly with Alva Myrdal)
1987		Óscar Arias	13 September 1940; Heredia, Costa Rica	(aged 86)	"for his work for lasting peace in Central America"
1992		Rigoberta Menchú	9 January 1959; Laj Chimel, Quiché, Guatemala	(aged 67)	"for her struggle for social justice and ethno-cultural reconciliation based on respect for the rights of indigenous peoples"
2016		Juan Manuel Santos	10 August 1951; Bogotá, Colombia	(aged 75)	"for his resolute efforts to bring the country's more than 50-year-long civil war to an end"
2025		María Corina Machado	7 October 1967; Caracas, Venezuela	(aged 59)	"for her tireless work promoting democratic rights for the people of Venezuela and for her struggle to achieve a just and peaceful transition from dictatorship to democracy"

== Nominees ==
=== Individuals ===
The nominees are not publicly named, nor are they told that they are being considered for the prize. All nomination records for a prize are sealed for 50 years from the awarding of the prize. Since its establishment, there have been 156 Latin American nominees (Note: Not including the organizations founded or based in Latin American countries.) from 1901 to 1976.

Number of Latin American Nobel nominees
Nominees by country
Category	(Argentina)	(Bolivia)	(Brazil)	(Chile)	(Colombia)	(Costa Rica)	(Cuba)	(Dominican Republic)	(Ecuador)	(El Salvador)	(Guatemala)	(Honduras)	(Mexico)	(Nicaragua)	(Panama)	(Paraguay)	(Peru)	(Puerto Rico)	(United States)	(Uruguay)	(Venezuela)	
Medicine	8		5	1			2						3		1		1	1		1	1	24
Physics				3 (Note: David Bohm applied for and received Brazilian citizenship, but by law, had to give up his US citizenship; he was able to reclaim it only decades later, in 1986, after pursuing a lawsuit.)													1					4
Chemistry	3		1					1					4							1		10
Literature	12	1	8	5	2		4		1		1	1	6				5	2		6	6	60
Peace	10	2	13	7	2		2	1	3	2			7				2	2	1	3	1	58
Economics	1																					1
Total	34	3	27	16	4		8	2	4	2	1	1	20		1		9	5	1	11	8	157
Nominees by sex
Men	28	3	27	15	4		7	2	4	2	1		19		1		9	4	1	10	7	144
Women	6			1			1					1	1					1		1	1	13

Picture	Name	Born	Died	Years Nominated	Notes
Argentina
Physiology or Medicine
	Luis Agote	22 September 1868; Buenos Aires, Argentina	12 November 1954; Turdera, Buenos Aires, Argentina	1920	Nominated jointly with Émile Jeanbrau (1873–1950) and Richard Lewisohn (1875–1961) by Vicente Izquierdo Sanfuentes (1850–1926).
	Ángel Roffo	30 December 30, 1882; Buenos Aires, Argentina	23 July 1947; Buenos Aires, Argentina	1927, 1937, 1940	
	Carlos Robertson Lavalle	1874; Buenos Aires, Argentina	23 April 1956; La Cumbre, Córdoba, Argentina	1928 (Note: Nomination was declared invalid by the Nobel Committee.)	Nominated by Fortunato Quesada Larrea (1895–1966).
	Pío del Río Hortega	5 May 1882; Portillo, Valladolid, Spain	1 June 1945; Buenos Aires, Argentina	1929, 1937	
	Bernardo Houssay	10 April 1887; Buenos Aires, Argentina	21 September 1971; Buenos Aires, Argentina	1931, 1934, 1935, 1936, 1937, 1939, 1940, 1941, 1942, 1943, 1944, 1946, 1947, 1948	Shared the 1947 Nobel Prize in Physiology or Medicine with Carl Ferdinand Cori and Gerty Radnitz-Cori.
	Mariano Rafael Castex	10 June 1886; Buenos Aires, Argentina	30 June 1968; Buenos Aires, Argentina	1944	Nominated by José Belbey (1894–1960).
	Luis Federico Leloir	6 September 1906; Paris, France	2 December 1987; Buenos Aires, Argentina	1956	Awarded the 1970 Nobel Prize in Chemistry
	Guillermo Andrés Bosco	3 June 1886; Dolores, Buenos Aires, Argentina	20 August 1971; Buenos Aires, Argentina	1956	Nominated by Orestes Eduardo Adorni (1892-1958).
Chemistry
	Friedrich Bergius	11 October 1884; Wrocław, Poland	30 March 1949; Buenos Aires, Argentina	1929, 1931	Shared the 1931 Nobel Prize in Chemistry with Carl Bosch.
	Dorothy Maud Wrinch	12 September 1894; Rosario, Argentina	11 February 1976; Falmouth, Massachusetts, United States	1939	
	Luis Federico Leloir	9 September 1906; Paris, France	2 December 1987; Buenos Aires, Argentina	1958, 1961, 1962, 1963, 1964, 1965, 1966, 1967, 1968, 1969, 1970	Awarded the 1970 Nobel Prize in Chemistry.
Literature
	Manuel Gálvez	6 May 1882; Paraná, Entre Ríos, Argentina	14 November 1962; Buenos Aires, Argentina	1932, 1933, 1934, 1951, 1952	
	Carlos María Ocantos	24 August 1860; Buenos Aires, Argentina	29 March 1949; Madrid, Spain	1933, 1943	
	Enrique Larreta	4 March 1875; Buenos Aires, Argentina	6 July 1961; Buenos Aires, Argentina	1942, 1943, 1944, 1945, (Note: Nomination was declared invalid by the Nobel Committee.) 1950	
	Jacinto Grau	6 April 1877; Barcelona, Spain	14 August 1958; Buenos Aires, Argentina	1949	Nominated by Hjalmar Gullberg (1898–1961).
	Ezequiel Martínez Estrada	14 September 1895; Buenos Aires, Argentina	4 November 1964; Bahía Blanca, Buenos Aires, Argentina	1951	
	Ricardo Rojas	16 September 1882; San Miguel de Tucumán, Tucumán, Argentina	29 July 1957; Buenos Aires, Argentina	1954	
	Jorge Luis Borges	24 August 1899; Buenos Aires, Argentina	14 June 1986; Geneva, Switzerland	1956, 1962, 1963, 1964, 1965, 1966, 1967, 1969, 1970, 1971, 1972, 1973, 1974, 1975	
	María Raquel Adler	c. 1900; Argentine Sea	28 July 1974; Bernal, Buenos Aires, Argentina	1959, 1965	
	Arturo Capdevila	14 March 1889; Córdoba, Argentina	20 December 1967; Buenos Aires, Argentina	1967	
	Segismundo Masel	1895; Argentina	1985; Argentina	1968, 1974, 1975	Nominated by Antonio de Tornes Ballesteros (?) each time.
	Victoria Ocampo	7 April 1890; Buenos Aires, Argentina	27 January 1979; Béccar, Buenos Aires, Argentina	1970, 1974, 1975	
	Eduardo Mallea	14 August 1904; Bahia Blanca, Argentina	12 November 1982; Buenos Aires, Argentina	1974	Nominated by Manuel Durán Gilli (1925–2020).
Peace
	Ángela de Oliveira Cézar de Costa	c. 1860; Gualeguaychú, Entre Ríos, Argentina	25 June 1940; Buenos Aires, Argentina	1910, 1911	
	Estanislao Zeballos	27 July 1854; Rosario, Santa Fe, Argentina	4 October 1923; Liverpool, England	1912, 1920, 1923	
	Luis María Drago	6 May 1859; Mercedes, Argentina	9 June 1921; Buenos Aires, Argentina	1914	Nominated by Ernesto Bosch (1863–1951).
	Carlos Francisco Melo	1873; Diamante, Entre Ríos, Argentina	2 October 1931; Buenos Aires, Argentina	1926	Nominated by Alejandro E. Mereira (?).
	Constancio Cecilio Vigil	4 September 1876; Rocha, Uruguay	24 September 1954; Buenos Aires, Argentina	1934	Nominated by Ramón Romero (?).
	Carlos Saavedra Lamas	1 November 1878; Buenos Aires, Argentina	5 May 1959; Buenos Aires, Argentina	1935, 1936, 1937	Awarded the 1936 Nobel Peace Prize.
	Eva Perón	7 May 1919; Los Toldos, Argentina	26 July 1952; Buenos Aires, Argentina	1949	Nominated with Juan Perón (1895–1974) by Virgilio Filippo (1896–1969).
	Juan Perón	8 October 1895; Lobos, Buenos Aires, Argentina	1 July 1974; Buenos Aires, Argentina	1949, 1974	President of Argentina (1946–1955; 1973–1974)
	Isabel Perón	4 February 1931; La Rioja, Argentina	(aged 95)	1976	Nominated by Decio B. Naranjo (?). 41st President of Argentina (1974–1976)
Economic Sciences
	Raúl Prebisch	17 April 1901; San Miguel de Tucumán, Argentina	29 April 1986; Santiago de Chile, Chile	1971, 1972	
Bolivia
Literature
	Adolfo Costa du Rels	19 June 1891; Sucre, Chuquisaca, Bolivia	May 26, 1980; La Paz, Bolivia	1973, 1974	Nominated by Humberto Palza (1900–1975) each time.
Peace
	Eduardo Anze Matienzo	14 October 1902; Cochabamba, Bolivia	1979; Bolivia	1953	Nominated by Ali Radai (1913–1974).
	Napoleón Bilbao Rioja	6 August 1902; Cochabamba, Bolivia	—N/a	1973	Nominated by Antonio Jorge Pérez Amuchãstegui (1921–1983) each time.
Brazil
Physiology or Medicine
	Carlos Chagas	9 July 1879; Oliveira, Minas Gerais, Brazil	8 November 1934; Rio de Janeiro, Brazil	1913, 1921, 1922, 1928	
	Antônio Cardoso Fontes	6 October 1879; Petrópolis, Rio de Janeiro, Brazil	27 March 1943; Rio de Janeiro, Brazil	1934	Nominated with Gaston Ramon (1886–1963) by Michel Weinberg (1868–1940).
	Adolfo Lutz	18 December 1855; Rio de Janeiro, Brazil	6 October 1940; Rio de Janeiro, Brazil	1938	Nominated by Octávio Coelho de Magalhães (1880–1972).
	Manuel de Abreu	4 January 1894; São Paulo, Brazil	30 January 1962; Rio de Janeiro, Brazil	1946, 1951, 1953	
	Giovanni Di Guglielmo	22 September 1886; São Paulo, Brazil	19 February 1961; Rome, Italy	1956	Nominated by Cesare Decio (1885-1957).
Physics
	César Lattes	11 July 1924; Curitiba, Brazil	8 March 2005; Campinas, Brazil	1949, 1951, 1952, 1953, 1954, 1975	
	David Bohm	20 December 1917; Wilkes-Barre, Pennsylvania, United States	27 October 1992; London, England	1958	
	José Leite Lopes	28 October 1918; Recife, Pernambuco, Brazil	12 June 2006; Rio de Janeiro, Brazil	1974	Nominated the by Oskar Klein (1894–1977).
Chemistry
	Fritz Feigl	15 May 1891; Vienna, Austria	23 January 1971; Rio de Janeiro, Brazil	1955, 1957, 1962, 1963, 1966, 1967, 1969, 1972	
Literature
	Henrique Coelho Neto	21 February 1864; Caxias, Maranhão, Brazil	28 November 1934; Rio de Janeiro, Brazil	1933	
	Flávio de Carvalho	10 August 1899; Rio de Janeiro, Brazil	4 June 1973; São Paulo, Brazil	1939	Nominated by Paul Vanorden Shaw (1898–1970).
	Manoel Cyrillo Wanderley	—N/a	—N/a	1941	Nominated by Francisco de Aquino Correia (1885–1956).
	Pietro Ubaldi	18 August 1886; Foligno, Perugia Italy	29 February 1972; São Paulo, Brazil	1962, 1963, 1964, 1965, 1966, 1967, 1968, 1969	
	Erico Verissimo	17 December 1905; Cruz Alta, Rio Grande do Sul, Brazil	28 November 1975; Porto Alegre, Rio Grande do Sul, Brazil	1963, 1968, 1974, 1975	
	Alceu Amoroso Lima	11 December 1893; Rio de Janeiro, Brazil	14 August 1983; Rio de Janeiro, Brazil	1965	
	Jorge Amado	10 August 1912; Itabuna, Bahia, Brazil	6 August 2001; Salvador, Bahia, Brazil	1967, 1968, 1969, 1970, 1971, 1972, 1973	
	Carlos Drummond de Andrade	31 October 1902; Itabira, Minas Gerais, Brazil	17 August 1987; Rio de Janeiro, Brazil	1967, 1969, 1974	
Peace
	Sebastião de Magalhães Lima	30 May 1850; Rio de Janeiro, Brazil	7 December 1928; Lisbon, Portugal	1909	Nominated by Feio Terenas (1850–1920).
	José Paranhos	20 April 1845; Rio de Janeiro, Brazil	10 February 1912; Rio de Janeiro, Brazil	1911	
	Érico Coelho	7 March 1849; Cabo Frio, Rio de Janeiro, Brazil	26 November 1922; Rio de Janeiro, Brazil	1916	Nominated by Alcindo Guanabara (1865–1918).
	Teixeira Mendes	5 January 1855; Caxias, Maranhão, Brazil	28 June 1927; Rio de Janeiro, Brazil	1924	Nominated by Joaquim Osório Duque Estrada (1870–1927).
	Afrânio de Melo Franco	25 February 1870; Paracatu, Minas Gerais, Brazil	1 January 1943; Rio de Janeiro, Brazil	1935, 1937, 1938	
	Oswaldo Aranha	15 February 1894; Alegrete, Rio Grande do Sul, Brazil	27 January 1960; Rio de Janeiro, Brazil	1948	
	Henrique Vasconcellos	11 May 1892; Rio de Janeiro, Brazil	14 October 1952; Cape Town, Western Cape, South Africa	1952	Nominated by Paulo Martins de Sousa Ramos (1896–1969).
	Raul Fernandes	24 October 1877; Valença, Rio de Janeiro, Brazil	6 January 1968; Rio de Janeiro, Brazil	1953, 1954	
	Cândido Rondon	5 May 1865; Santo Antônio do Leverger, Mato Grosso, Brazil	19 April 1958; Rio de Janeiro, Brazil	1953, 1957	
	Josué de Castro	5 September 1908; Recife, Pernambuco, Brazil	24 September 1973; Paris, France	1953, 1963, 1964, 1965, 1970, 1973	
	Jan Antonín Baťa	7 March 1898; Uherské Hradiště, Czechia	23 August 1965; São Paulo, Brazil	1957	Nominated by Felix John Vondracek (1901–1984).
	Hélder Câmara	7 February 1909; Fortaleza, Ceará, Brazil	27 August 1999; Recife, Pernambuco, Brazil	1970, 1971, 1972, 1973, 1974, 1975, 1976	
	Cláudio Villas-Bôas	8 December 1916; Botucatu, São Paulo, Brazil	1 March 1998; São Paulo, Brazil	1971, 1972, 1973, 1974, 1976	Nominated jointly each time.
	Orlando Villas-Bôas	12 January 1914; Santa Cruz do Rio Pardo, São Paulo, Brazil	12 December 2002; São Paulo, Brazil	1971, 1972, 1973, 1974, 1976	Nominated jointly each time.
Chile
Physiology or Medicine
	Rudolf Kraus	31 October 1868; Mladá Boleslav, Czechia	15 July 1932; Santiago, Chile	1916	
Literature
	Pedro Pablo Figueroa	25 December 1857; Copiapó, Chile	4 January 1909; Santiago, Chile	1906 (Note: Nomination was declared invalid by the Nobel committee because the nominator Leonardo Eliz (1861–1939) from the Valparaiso Secondary School was found to be ineligible.)	Nominated by Leonardo Eliz (1861–1939).
	Vicente Huidobro	10 January 1893; Santiago, Chile	2 January 1948; Catagena, San Antonio, Chile	1926	Nominated by Enrique Nercasseau Morán (1854–1925).
	Egidio Poblete	7 November 1868; Los Andes, Chile	18 October 1940; Valparaíso, Chile	1939	Nominated by Miguel Luís Amunátegui Reyes (1862–1949).
	Gabriela Mistral	7 April 1889; Vicuña, Elqui, Chile	10 January 1957; Hempstead, New York, United States	1940, 1941, 1942, 1943, 1944, 1945	Awarded the 1945 Nobel Prize in Literature.
	Pablo Neruda	12 July 1904; Parral, Linares, Chile	23 September 1973; Santiago, Chile	1956, 1961, 1962, 1963, 1964, 1965, 1966, 1967, 1968, 1969, 1970, 1971	Awarded the 1971 Nobel Prize in Literature.
Peace
	Carlos Ibáñez del Campo	3 November 1877; Linares, Chile	28 April 1960; Santiago, Chile	1930	Nominated jointly with Augusto Bernardino Leguía (1863–1932). 19th and 25th President of Chile (1927–1931, 1952–1958)
	Alejandro Álvarez	9 February 1868; Santiago, Chile	19 July 1960; Paris, France	1932, 1933, 1934	
	Miguel Cruchaga Tocornal	4 May 1869; Santiago, Chile	3 May 1949; Santiago, Chile	1949	Nominated by Carlos Saavedra Lamas (1878–1959) but died before the only chance to be considered.
	Lorenzo Fernández Rodríguez	1887; Chile	1953; Chile	1952, 1954, 1958, 1974	
	Manuel Bianchi Gundián	14 January 1894; Santiago, Chile	16 December 1982; Santiago, Chile	1974	
	Fernando Ariztía Ruiz	27 May 1925; Santiago, Chile	25 November 2003; Copiapó, Chile	1976	
	Helmut Frenz	4 February 1933; Allenstein, East Prussia	13 September 2011; Hamburg, Germany	1976	
Colombia
Literature
	Germán Pardo García	19 July 1902; Ibagué, Tolima, Colombia	23 August 1991; Mexico City, Mexico	1967, 1968, 1969, 1970, 1974, 1975	
	Gabriel García Márquez	6 March 1927; Aracataca, Magdalena, Colombia	17 April 2014; Mexico City, Mexico	1975	Awarded the 1982 Nobel Prize in Literature.
Peace
	Alberto Lleras Camargo	3 July 1906; Bogotá, Colombia	4 January 1990; Bogotá, Colombia	1953, 1954	20th President of Colombia (1958–1962)
	Fernando Tamayo Tamayo	13 February 1950; Palermo, Boyacá, Colombia	13 April 2018; Bogotá, Colombia	1973	Nominated by Norman Borlaug (1914–2009).
Cuba
Physiology or Medicine
	Aristides Agramonte	3 June 1868; Camagüey, Cuba	19 August 1931; New Orleans, Louisiana, United States	1903, 1905, 1912, 1913, 1914, 1915, 1917	
	Carlos Finlay	3 December 1833; Camagüey, Cuba	20 August 1915; Havana, Cuba	1905, 1906, 1907, 1912, 1913, 1914, 1915	
Literature
	Laura Mestre Hevia	6 April 1867; Havana, Cuba	11 January 1944; Havana, Cuba	1931	Nominated by Juan Miguel Dihigo Mestre (1866–1952).
	Armando Álvarez Pedroso	29 June 1907; Havana, Cuba	9 September 1990; Dade City, Florida, United States	1945 (Note: Nomination was declared invalid by the Nobel Committee.)	
	Armand Godoy	1 April 1880; Havana, Cuba	11 March 1964; Lausanne, Switzerland	1956, 1957, 1960, 1961	
	Alejo Carpentier	26 December 1904; Lausanne, Switzerland	24 April 1980; Paris, France	1965, 1966, 1967, 1971	
Peace
	Moisés Vieites	c. 1881; Havana, Cuba	—N/a	1934	Nominated by Pedro Cué Abreu (?).
	Antonio Sánchez de Bustamante	13 April 1865; Havana, Cuba	24 August 1951; Havana, Cuba	1948, 1949	
Dominican Republic
Chemistry
	Emilio Noelting	8 June 1851; Puerto Plata, Dominican Republic	6 August 1922; Merano, South Tyrol, Italy	1920	Nominated by Karol Dziewoński (1876–1943).
Peace
	Rafael Trujillo	24 October 1891; San Cristóbal, Dominican Republic	30 May 1961; Santo Domingo, Dominican Republic	1936, 1937	Nominated jointly with Sténio Vincent (1874–1959) each time. 3rd and 6th President of the Dominican Republic (1930–1938, 1942–1952)
Ecuador
Literature
	Víctor Manuel Rendón	5 December 1859; Guayaquil, Ecuador	9 October 1940; Guayaquil, Ecuador	1935	Nominated by Celiano Monge Navarrete (1856–1940).
Peace
	Carlos Rodolfo Tobar	4 November 1853; Quito, Ecuador	19 April 1920; Barcelona, Spain	1909	Nominated by H. Vasques (?).
	Galo Plaza	17 February 1906; New York City, United States	28 January 1987; Quito, Ecuador	1965	Nominated by Ralph Bunche (1904–1971). 29th President of Ecuador (1948–1952)
	Luis Bossano	19 April 1905; Quito, Ecuador	5 November 1997; Quito, Ecuador	1974, 1975	
El Salvador
Peace
	Miguel Ángel Araújo	1858; Jucuapa, Usulután, El Salvador	2 August 1942; San Salvador, El Salvador	1935	
	José Gustavo Guerrero	26 June 1876; San Salvador, El Salvador	25 October 1958; Nice, Alpes-Maritimes, France	1948, 1949	
Guatemala
Literature
	Miguel Ángel Asturias	19 October 1899; Guatemala City, Guatemala	9 June 1974; Madrid, Spain	1964, 1965, 1966, 1967	Awarded the 1967 Nobel Prize in Literature.
Honduras
Literature
	Argentina Díaz Lozano	5 December 1909; Santa Rosa de Copán, Honduras	13 August 1999; Tegucigalpa, Honduras	1974	
Mexico
Physiology or Medicine
	Enrique Paschen	30 December 1860; Tacubaya, Mexico City, Mexico	22 October 1936; Hamburg, Germany	1932	
	Alexander von Lichtenberg	20 January 1880; Budapest, Hungary	21 April 1949; Mexico City, Mexico	1934	Nominated Ralph Michael LeComte (1888–1954).
	Arturo Rosenblueth	2 October 1900 in Ciudad Guerrero, Chihuahua, Mexico	20 September 1970 in Mexico City, Mexico	1952	Nominated by Ignacio González Guzmán (1898–1972).
Chemistry
	Henry Eyring	20 February 1901; Colonia Juárez, Chihuahua, Mexico	26 December 1981; Salt Lake City, Utah, United States	1944, 1950, 1958, 1959, 1960, 1961, 1963, 1964, 1965, 1968, 1969, 1970, 1971, 1972, 1973, 1974	
	Guillermo Carvajal-Sandoval	10 February 1926; Ciudad Altamirano, Guerrero, Mexico	2008	1974	Nominated jointly by R. Corona (?).
	Carlos Casas Campillo	12 October 1916; Córdoba, Veracruz, Mexico	6 October 1994; Mexico City, Mexico	1974	Nominated jointly by R. Corona (?).
	Jesús Romo Armería	9 October 1922; Aguascalientes, Mexico	14 May 1977; Mexico City, Mexico	1974	Nominated jointly by R. Corona (?).
Literature
	Rafael Altamira y Crevea	10 February 1866; Alicante, Spain	1 June 1951; Mexico City, Mexico	1911, 1912	Nominated for the Nobel Peace Prize too.
	Enrique González Martínez	13 April 1871; Guadalajara, Jalisco, Mexico	19 February 1952; Mexico City, Mexico	1949, 1952	
	Alfonso Reyes	17 May 1889; Monterrey, Nuevo León, Mexico	27 December 1959; Mexico City, Mexico	1949, 1953, 1956, 1958, 1959	
	María Enriqueta Camarillo	19 February 1872; Coatepec, Veracruz, Mexico	13 February 1968; Mexico City, Mexico	1951	
	Luis Buñuel	22 February 1900; Calanda, Teruel, Spain	29 July 1983; Mexico City, Mexico	1968, 1972	
	Octavio Paz	31 March 1914; Mexico City, Mexico	19 April 1998; Mexico City, Mexico	1974, 1975	Awarded the 1990 Nobel Prize in Literature.
Peace
	Rafael Altamira y Crevea	10 February 1866; Alicante, Spain	1 June 1951; Mexico City, Mexico	1908, 1909, 1911, 1933, 1951	Nominated for Nobel Prize in Literature too.
	Edo Fimmen	18 June 1881; Nieuwer-Amstel, North Holland, Netherlands	14 December 1942; Cuernavaca, Morelos, Mexico	1937	
	Miguel Alemán Valdés	29 September 1900; Sayula de Alemán, Veracruz, Mexico	14 May 1983; Mexico City, Mexico	1952, 1953	53rd President of Mexico (1946–1952)
	Adolfo López Mateos	26 May 1909; Ciudad López Mateos, Mexico	22 September 1969; Mexico City, Mexico	1963, 1964	55th President of Mexico (1958–1964)
	Alfonso García Robles	20 March 1911; Zamora, Michoacán, Mexico	2 September 1991; Mexico City, Mexico	1968, 1969, 1970, 1971, 1972	Shared the 1982 Nobel Peace Prize with Alva Myrdal.
	Robert Schirokauer Hartman	27 January 1910; Berlin, Germany	20 September 1973; Mexico City, Mexico	1973	Died before the only chance to be considered.
	Luis Echeverría	17 January 1922; Mexico City, Mexico	8 July 2022; Cuernavaca, Morelos, Mexico	1974, 1975, 1976	57th President of Mexico (1970–1976)
Panama
Physiology or Medicine
	William Crawford Gorgas	3 October 1854; Toulminville, Alabama, United States	3 July 1920; London, England	1909, 1914, 1915, 1916, 1918, 1919	
Peru
Physiology or Medicine
	Alberto Barton	12 August 1870; Buenos Aires, Argentina	25 October 1950; Lima, Peru	1941	Nominated by Carlos Enrique Paz Soldán (1885–1972).
Physics
	Santiago Antúnez de Mayolo	10 January 1887; Huacllan, Aija, Peru	20 April 1967; Lima, Peru	1943	Nominated the only time by C. Granda (?).
Literature
	Francisco García Calderón	8 April 1883; Valparaíso, Chile	1 July 1953; Lima, Peru	1934	
	Ventura García Calderón	23 February 1886; Paris, France	27 October 1959; Paris, France	1934	
	Alberto Hidalgo	23 May 1897; Arequipa, Peru	12 November 1967; Buenos Aires, Argentina	1953, 1966, 1968	
	Mario Roques	1 July 1875; Callao, Peru	8 March 1961; Paris, France	1959, 1960	Nominated by Ida-Marie Frandon (1907–1997).
	José María Arguedas	18 January 1911; Andahuaylas, Peru	2 December 1969; Jesús María District, Lima, Peru	1971	Posthumously nominated by Elie Poulenard (1901–1985).
Peace
	Augusto Bernardino Leguía	19 February 1863; Lambayeque, Peru	6 February 1932; Callao, Peru	1930	Nominated jointly with Carlos Ibáñez del Campo (1877–1960). 40th President of Peru (1919–1930)
	Mariano Cornejo Zenteno	28 October 1866; Arequipa, Peru	25 March 1942; Paris, France	1931, 1932, 1933, 1934, 1935, 1936, 1937, 1938, 1939, 1940	
Puerto Rico
Physiology or Medicine
	Bailey Ashford	18 September 1873; Washington, D.C., United States	1 November 1934; San Juan, Puerto Rico	1915	
Literature
	Juan Ramón Jiménez	24 December 1881; Moguer, Huelva, Spain	29 May 1958; San Juan, Puerto Rico	1952, 1953, 1954, 1955, 1956	Awarded the 1956 Nobel Prize in Literature.
	Evaristo Ribera Chevremont	16 February 1890; San Juan, Puerto Rico	1 March 1976; San Juan, Puerto Rico	1970, 1971, 1972, 1973	
Peace
	Pablo Casals	29 December 1876; El Vendrell, Tarragona, Spain	22 October 1973; San Juan, Puerto Rico	1956, 1958, 1959	
	Conchita Cuchí Coll de Carlo	1 September 1907; Santurce, San Juan, Puerto Rico	March 1981; San Juan, Puerto Rico	1974, 1976	
United States
Peace
	Cesar Chavez	March 31, 1927; Yuma, Arizona, United States	April 23, 1993; San Luis, Arizona, United States	1971, 1974, 1975, 1976	
Uruguay
Physiology or Medicine
	Juan César Mussio-Fournier	7 February 1890; Montevideo, Uruguay	1 January 1961; Montevideo, Uruguay	1950	Nominated by Velarde Pérez Fontana (1897–1975).
Chemistry
	Domingo Giribaldo	25 January 1860; Pando, Canelones, Uruguay	9 July 1950; Montevideo, Uruguay	1949	
Literature
	Juan Zorrilla de San Martín	28 December 1855; Montevideo, Uruguay	3 November 1931; Montevideo, Uruguay	1926, 1928	
	Carlos Vaz Ferreira	15 October 1872; Montevideo, Uruguay	3 January 1958; Montevideo, Uruguay	1955	
	Jules Supervielle	16 January 1884; Montevideo, Uruguay	17 May 1960; Paris, France	1956, 1957, 1960	
	Juana de Ibarbourou	8 March 1892; Melo, Cerro Largo, Uruguay	15 July 1979; Montevideo, Uruguay	1959, 1960, 1963	
	Emilio Oribe	13 April 1893; Melo, Cerro Largo, Uruguay	24 May 1975; Montevideo, Uruguay	1970	Nominated by Sarah Bollo (1904–1987).
	Federico Morador Otero	5 May 1896; Montevideo, Uruguay	1977; Uruguay	1975	Nominated by Eduardo Payssé Reyes (1902–1986).
Peace
	Gabriel Terra	1 August 1873; Montevideo, Uruguay	15 September 1942; Montevideo, Uruguay	1934	Nominated by Abel José Pérez (1857–1945). 40th President of Uruguay (1931–1938)
	Constancio Cecilio Vigil	4 September 1876; Rocha, Uruguay	24 September 1954; Buenos Aires, Argentina	1934	Nominated by Ramón Romero (?).
	Eugen Relgis	22 March 1895; Iași, Romania	24 May 1987; Montevideo, Uruguay	1956	
Venezuela
Physiology or Medicine
	August Pi Suñer	12 August 1879; Barcelona, Spain	12 January 1965; Mexico City, Mexico	1915, 1920, 1945, 1948, 1949	
Literature
	Julio Calcaño (Note: Calcaño: Tres poetas pesimistas del siglo XIX ("Three Pessimistic Nineteenth Century Poets", 1907))	4 December 1840; Caracas, Venezuela	18 August 1918; Caracas, Venezuela	1908	Nominated by José María Manrique (1846–1907).
	Rufino Blanco Fombona	17 June 1874; Caracas, Venezuela	16 October 1944; Buenos Aires, Argentina	1928, 1929, 1930, 1933, 1935	
	Clotilde Crespo de Arvelo	September 19, 1887; Los Teques, Venezuela	20 June 1959; Caracas, Venezuela	1930	Nominated by Manuel María Villalobos (1858–1929).
	Rómulo Gallegos	2 August 1884; Caracas, Venezuela	5 April 1969; Caracas, Venezuela	1951, 1959, 1960, 1961, 1962, 1963, 1964, 1966, 1967	39th President of Venezuela (1948)
	Wilhelm Lehmann	4 May 1882; Puerto Cabello, Carabobo, Venezuela	17 November 1968; Eckernförde, Schleswig-Holstein, Germany	1960	Nominated by Friedrich Sengle (1909–1994).
	Robert Ganzo	22 August 1898; Caracas, Venezuela	6 April 1995; Boulogne-Billancourt, France	1970	Nominated by André Lebois (1915–1978).
Peace
	Carlos Medina Chirinos	13 January 1884; Maracaibo, Zulia, Venezuela	8 November 1946; Maracaibo, Zulia, Venezuela	1926	Nominated by José María González Delgado (?).

=== Organizations ===
The following list are organizations (Note: "Organizations" refers to any collective group such as foundations, movements, institutes, societies, nations, federations, ministries, programmes, committees or associations.) founded or based in Latin American countries.

Picture	Name	Born	Died	Years Nominated	Notes
Argentina
Peace
	South American Universal Peace Association	1907; Buenos Aires, Argentina	1911	Nominated by Ángela de Oliveira Cézar de Costa (1860–1940).	
Brazil
Peace
	Brazilian Historic and Geographic Institute	October 1838; Rio de Janeiro, Brazil	1924	Nominated by Clóvis Beviláqua (1859–1944).	
Chile
Peace
	Committee of Cooperation for Peace in Chile	October 1973; Santiago, Chile	1976	Nominated by American Friends Service Committee.	
Cuba
Peace
	International Air Transport Association	April 1945; Havana, Cuba	1945	Nominated jointly with ICAO, IFALPA and Howard Kurtz (1907–1997) by Oliver Lissitzyn (1912–1994).	
Uruguay
	Inter-American Children's Institute	July 1924; Montevideo, Uruguay	1975	Nominated by Edner Brutus (1911–1980).	

== See also ==
- List of Argentine Nobel laureates
- List of Spanish Nobel laureates
- List of Asian Nobel laureates
- List of Jewish Nobel laureates
