= List of Chinese Nobel laureates =

The Nobel Prize

Since 1957, there have been fourteen Chinese (including Chinese-born) winners of the Nobel Prize. The Nobel Prize is a Sweden-based international monetary prize. The award was established by the 1895 will and estate of Swedish chemist and inventor Alfred Nobel. It was first awarded in Physics, Chemistry, Physiology or Medicine, Literature, and Peace in 1901. An associated prize, The Sveriges Riksbank Prize in Economic Sciences in Memory of Alfred Nobel, was instituted by Sweden's central bank in 1968 and first awarded in 1969.

Following is a list of Nobel laureates who have been citizens of the Republic of China or the People's Republic of China and of overseas birth.

== Laureates ==
=== Chinese citizens ===
==== Republic of China (Taiwan) ====
The following are Nobel laureates who have been citizens of the Republic of China at any point before, during, or after receiving the Nobel Prize.

Year	Laureate	Chinese name	English name	Category	Life	Rationale	Place of birth
1957		楊振寧	Yang Chen-Ning	Physics	1922–2025	"for their penetrating investigation of the so-called parity laws which has led to important discoveries regarding the elementary particles"	Hefei, Anhui, China
1957		李政道	Tsung-Dao Lee	Physics	1926–2024	"for their penetrating investigation of the so-called parity laws which has led to important discoveries regarding the elementary particles"	Shanghai, China
1976		丁肇中	Samuel C. C. Ting	Physics	1936–	"for pioneering work in the discovery of a heavy elementary particle of a new kind."	Ann Arbor, Michigan, United States; Dual-citizen of United States and (Taiwan) Republic of China
1986		李遠哲	Yuan T. Lee	Chemistry	1936–	"for contributions concerning the dynamics of chemical elementary processes".	Shinchiku City, Shinchiku Prefecture, Japanese Taiwan

==== People's Republic of China ====
The following are Nobel laureates who have been citizens of the People's Republic of China at any point before, during, or after receiving the Nobel Prize.

Year	Laureate	Chinese name	English name	Category	Life	Rationale	Place of birth
1957		楊振寧	Yang Chen-Ning	Physics	1922–2025	Shared with Tsung-Dao Lee; "for their penetrating investigation of the so-called parity laws which has led to important discoveries regarding the elementary particles"	Hefei, Anhui, China
2000		高行健	Gao Xingjian	Literature	1940–	"for an œuvre of universal validity, bitter insights and linguistic ingenuity, which has opened new paths for the Chinese novel and drama".	Ganzhou, Jiangxi, China
2010		劉曉波	Liu Xiaobo	Peace	1955–2017	"for his long and non-violent struggle for fundamental human rights in China".	Changchun, Jilin, China
2012		莫言	Mo Yan	Literature	1955–	"who with hallucinatory realism merges folk tales, history and the contemporary".	Gaomi, Shandong, China
2015		屠呦呦	Tu Youyou	Physiology or Medicine	1930–	"for her discoveries concerning a novel therapy against Malaria".	Ningbo, Zhejiang, China

=== Chinese diaspora ===
Year	Laureate	Chinese name	English name	Category	Life	Rationale	Place of birth (Note: The Nobel website lists the country of Residence at the time of the award for both the Literature and Peace (if goes to a person) prizes; see "Facts" information of the individuals at and . While the prizes for Physics, Chemistry, Physiology or Medicine, and Economic Sciences are listed by Affiliation at the time of the award; see "Facts" information of the individuals at , , , and . The official Nobel website only lists the country of the person's affiliated insititions for Physics, Chemistry, Physiology or Medicine, and Economic Sciences prizes, and not the citizenship of the person himself.)
1997		朱棣文	Steven Chu	Physics	1948–	"for development of methods to cool and trap atoms with laser light".	St. Louis, Missouri, United States
1998		崔琦	Daniel C. Tsui	Physics	1939–	"for discovery of a new form of quantum fluid with fractionally charged excitations"	Pingdingshan, Henan, China
2008		錢永健	Roger Y. Tsien	Chemistry	1952–2016	"for the discovery and development of the green fluorescent protein, GFP"	New York City, New York, United States
2009		高錕	Charles K. Kao	Physics	1933–2018	"for groundbreaking achievements concerning the transmission of light in fibers for optical communication"	Shanghai, China
2024		杰米斯·哈萨比斯	Demis Hassabis	Chemistry	1976–	“for protein structure prediction”	London, England, United Kingdom

== Others ==
Tibetan

The following are the Nobel laureates who were of uncertain citizenship at the time they were awarded the Nobel Prize.

Year	Laureate		Category	Life	Rationale	Place of birth
1989	བསྟན་འཛིན་རྒྱ་མཚོ་	14th Dalai Lama (Tenzin Gyatso)	Peace	1935–	"for advocating peaceful solutions based upon tolerance and mutual respect in order to preserve the historical and cultural heritage of his people."	Taktser, Qinghai, China (Note: The Nobel Peace Prize 1989 indicates Dalai Lama was born in Tibet in 1935. Taktser is a village located in Greater Tibet, the eastern part of which was called Qinghai (spelled Tsinghai at the time) by the Nationalist Government of the Republic of China. Although Tibet itself was not controlled by the Republic of China government, Tsinghai (Qinghai) province was under the authority of the government of the Republic of China.)

== See also ==
- List of Chinese people
- List of Chinese scientists
- List of black Nobel laureates
- List of Latino and Hispanic Nobel laureates
- List of Nobel laureates by country
