= List of Christian Nobel laureates =

In an estimate by Baruch Shalev, between 1901 and 2000 about two-thirds of Nobel Prize winners were either Christians or had a Christian background. Here is a non exhaustive list of some of the prize winners who publicly identified themselves as Christians.

== Physics ==
By one estimate made by Weijia Zhang from Arizona State University and Robert G. Fuller from University of Nebraska–Lincoln, between 1901 and 1990, 60% of Nobel Prize in Physics winners had Christian backgrounds. In an estimate by Baruch Shalev, between 1901 and 2000, about 65.3% of Physics Nobel prize winners were either Christians or had a Christian background.

Year	Laureate	Country	Denomination	Rationale
1901	Wilhelm Röntgen	Germany	Dutch Reformed Church	"for the discovery of X rays"
1902	Hendrik Lorentz	Netherlands	raised Protestant but attended Catholic services	" discovery and theoretical explanation of the Zeeman effect"
1904	Lord Rayleigh	United Kingdom	Anglican	"for his investigations of the densities of the most important gases and for his discovery of argon in connection with these studies"
1906	Joseph John Thomson	United Kingdom	Anglican	"for his theoretical and experimental investigations on the conduction of electricity by gases"
1909	Guglielmo Marconi	Italy	Roman Catholic	"for his contributions to the development of wireless telegraphy"
1914	Max von Laue	Germany	Christian	"for his discovery of the diffraction of X-rays by crystals".
1915	William Henry Bragg	United Kingdom	Christian	"for their services in the analysis of crystal structure by means of X-rays"
1917	Charles Glover Barkla	United Kingdom	Methodist	"for his discovery of the characteristic Röntgen radiation of the elements", another important step in the development of X-ray spectroscopy
1918	Max Planck	Germany	Member of the Lutheran Church (deistic outlook)	" for the discovery of energy quanta"
1923	Robert Andrews Millikan	United States	Christian He dealt with this in his Terry Lectures at Yale in 1926–27, published as Evolution in Science and Religion.	"for his work on the elementary charge of electricity and on the photoelectric effect"
1927	Arthur Holly Compton	United States	Presbyterian	"for his discovery of the effect named after him"
1932	Werner Heisenberg	Weimar Republic	Lutheran	"for the creation of quantum mechanics, the application of which has, inter alia, led to the discovery of the allotropic forms of hydrogen"
1936	Victor Francis Hess	Austria	Roman Catholic He wrote on the topic of science and religion in his article "My Faith".	"for his discovery of cosmic radiation"
1951	Ernest Thomas Sinton Walton	Ireland	Methodist	"for his pioneer work on the transmutation of atomic nuclei by artificially accelerated atomic particles"
1964	Charles Hard Townes	United States	Protestant (United Church of Christ)	"for fundamental work in the field of quantum electronics, which has led to the construction of oscillators and amplifiers based on the maser–laser principle"
1974	Antony Hewish	United Kingdom	Christian	"for his pioneering research in radio astrophysics: Ryle for his observations and inventions, in particular of the aperture synthesis technique, and Hewish for his decisive role in the discovery of pulsars"
1977	Nevill Francis Mott	United Kingdom	Anglican	"for their fundamental theoretical investigations of the electronic structure of magnetic and disordered systems".
1981	Arthur Leonard Schawlow	United States	Protestant (United Methodist Church)	"for their contribution to the development of laser spectroscopy".
1993	Joseph Hooton Taylor Jr.	United States	Quaker	“for the discovery of a new type of pulsar, a discovery that has opened up new possibilities for the study of gravitation”
1997	William Daniel Phillips	United States	Protestant (United Methodist Church)	"for development of methods to cool and trap atoms with laser light".
1998	Daniel C. Tsui	USA	Lutheran	"for their discovery of a new form of quantum fluid with fractionally charged excitations."
2007	Peter Grünberg	Germany	Roman Catholic	"for the discovery of giant magnetoresistance"
2009	Charles K. Kao	United Kingdom, United States	Roman Catholic	"for groundbreaking achievements concerning the transmission of light in fibers for optical communication"
2018	Donna Strickland	Canada	Protestant (United Church of Canada)	"for their method of generating high-intensity, ultra-short optical pulses"

== Chemistry ==
In an estimate by Baruch Shalev, between 1901 and 2000, about 72.5% of Nobel Prize in Chemistry winners were either Christians or had a Christian background.

Year	Laureate	Country	Denomination	Rationale
1905	Adolf von Baeyer	Germany	Lutheran	"in recognition of his services in the advancement of organic chemistry and the chemical industry, through his work on organic dyes and hydroaromatic compounds"
1918	Fritz Haber	Germany	Converted to Protestantism from Judaism	"for the synthesis of ammonia from its elements"
1943	George de Hevesy	Hungary	Converted to Catholicism from Judaism	“for his work on the use of isotopes as tracers in the study of chemical processes”
1996	Richard E. Smalley	United States	Christian	"for the discovery of fullerenes"
2007	Gerhard Ertl	Germany	Christian	"for his studies of chemical processes on solid surfaces"
2012	Brian Kobilka	United States	Catholic	"for studies of G-protein-coupled receptors."
2019	John B. Goodenough	United States (Born in Weimar Republic)	Christian	"for the development of lithium-ion batteries".

== Physiology or Medicine ==
In an estimate by Baruch Shalev, between 1901 and 2000, about 62% of Nobel Prize in Physiology or Medicine winners were either Christians or had a Christian background.

Year	Laureate	Country	Denomination	Rationale
1906	Santiago Ramón y Cajal	Spain	Roman Catholic	"in recognition of his work on the structure of the nervous system"
1909	Emil Theodor Kocher	Switzerland	Protestant (Moravian Church)	"for his work on the physiology, pathology and surgery of the thyroid gland"
1912	Alexis Carrel	France	Roman Catholic	"[for] his work on vascular suture and the transplantation of blood vessels and organs"
1930	Karl Landsteiner	Austria-Hungary	converted to Roman Catholicism from Judaism in 1890	"for his discovery of human blood groups"
1947	Gerty Theresa Cori, née Radnitz	United States	converted to Roman Catholicism from Judaism in 1920	"for their discovery of the course of the catalytic conversion of glycogen"
1947	Carl Ferdinand Cori	United States	Roman Catholic	“for their discovery of the course of the catalytic conversion of glycogen”
1963	Sir John Carew Eccles	Australia	Roman Catholic	"for his discoveries concerning the ionic mechanisms involved in excitation and inhibition in the peripheral and central portions of the nerve cell membrane"
1974	George Emil Palade	Romania	Romanian Orthodox Church	"for his innovations in electron microscopy and cell fractionation which together laid the foundations of modern molecular cell biology, the most notable discovery being the ribosomes of the endoplasmic reticulum – which he first described in 1955."
1978	Werner Arber	Switzerland	Protestant	"for the discovery of restriction enzymes and their application to problems of molecular genetics"
1990	Joseph E. Murray	United States	Roman Catholic	"their discoveries concerning organ and cell transplantation in the treatment of human disease."
1998	Ferid Murad	United States	Christian	"for their discoveries concerning nitric oxide as a signalling molecule in the cardiovascular system".
2007	Mario Capecchi	United States	Quaker	“for their discoveries of principles for introducing specific gene modifications in mice by the use of embryonic stem cells”
2012	Sir John B. Gurdon	United Kingdom	Protestant (Anglican)	"for the discovery that mature cells can be reprogrammed to become pluripotent"
2015	William C. Campbell	Ireland	Roman Catholic	"for their discoveries concerning a novel therapy against infections caused by roundworm parasites".

== Literature ==
In an estimate by Baruch Shalev, between 1901 and 2000, about 49.5% of Nobel Prize in Literature winners were either Christians or had a Christian background.

Year	Laureate	Country	Denomination	Rationale
1902	Theodor Mommsen	Germany	Protestant	"the greatest living master of the art of historical writing, with special reference to his monumental work, A History of Rome"
1903	Bjørnstjerne Bjørnson	Norway	Protestant	"as a tribute to his noble, magnificent and versatile poetry, which has always been distinguished by both the freshness of its inspiration and the rare purity of its spirit"
1904	Frédéric Mistral	France	Roman Catholic	"in recognition of the fresh originality and true inspiration of his poetic production, which faithfully reflects the natural scenery and native spirit of his people, and, in addition, his significant work as a Provençal philologist"
1904	José Echegaray	Spain	Roman Catholic	"in recognition of the numerous and brilliant compositions which, in an individual and original manner, have revived the great traditions of the Spanish drama"
1905	Henryk Sienkiewicz	Poland	Roman Catholic	"because of his outstanding merits as an epic writer"
1909	Selma Lagerlöf	Sweden	Christian	"in appreciation of the lofty idealism, vivid imagination and spiritual perception that characterize her writings"
1910	Paul von Heyse	Germany	Protestant of Jewish descent	"as a tribute to the consummate artistry, permeated with idealism, which he has demonstrated during his long productive career as a lyric poet, dramatist, novelist and writer of world-renowned short stories"
1916	Verner von Heidenstam	Sweden	Christian	"in recognition of his significance as the leading representative of a new era in our literature"
1923	William Butler Yeats	Ireland	Anglican	"for his always inspired poetry, which in a highly artistic form gives expression to the spirit of a whole nation"
1924	Władysław Reymont	Poland	Roman Catholic	"for his great national epic, The Peasants"
1926	Grazia Deledda	Italy	Roman Catholic	"for her idealistically inspired writings which with plastic clarity picture the life on her native island and with depth and sympathy deal with human problems in general"
1928	Sigrid Undset	Norway (Born in Denmark)	Roman Catholic	"principally for her powerful descriptions of Northern life during the Middle Ages"
1929	Thomas Mann	Germany	Protestant (Lutheran)	"principally for his great novel, Buddenbrooks, which has won steadily increased recognition as one of the classic works of contemporary literature"
1933	Ivan Bunin	France (Born in Russia)	Eastern Orthodox	"for the strict artistry with which he has carried on the classical Russian traditions in prose writing"
1938	Pearl S. Buck	United States	Protestant (Southern Presbyterian)	"for her rich and truly epic descriptions of peasant life in China and for her biographical masterpieces"
1945	Gabriela Mistral	Chile	Roman Catholic	"for her lyric poetry which, inspired by powerful emotions, has made her name a symbol of the idealistic aspirations of the entire Latin American world"
1946	Hermann Hesse	Switzerland (Born in Germany)	Christian	"for his inspired writings which, while growing in boldness and penetration, exemplify the classical humanitarian ideals and high qualities of style"
1947	André Gide	France	Protestant	"for his comprehensive and artistically significant writings, in which human problems and conditions have been presented with a fearless love of truth and keen psychological insight"
1948	T. S. Eliot	United Kingdom (Born in the United States)	Anglican	"for his outstanding, pioneer contribution to present-day poetry"
1949	William Faulkner	United States	Protestant (Episcopalian)	"for his powerful and artistically unique contribution to the modern American novel"
1952	François Mauriac	France	Roman Catholic	"for the deep spiritual insight and the artistic intensity with which he has in his novels penetrated the drama of human life"
1953	Sir Winston Churchill	United Kingdom	Anglican	"for his mastery of historical and biographical description as well as for brilliant oratory in defending exalted human values"
1954	Ernest Hemingway	United States	Converted to Roman Catholicism	"for his mastery of the art of narrative, most recently demonstrated in The Old Man and the Sea, and for the influence that he has exerted on contemporary style"
1955	Halldór Laxness	Iceland	Converted to Roman Catholicism	"for his vivid epic power which has renewed the great narrative art of Iceland"
1956	Juan Ramón Jiménez	Spain	Roman Catholic	"for his lyrical poetry, which in Spanish language constitutes an example of high spirit and artistical purity"
1958	Boris Pasternak	Soviet Union	Converted to Eastern Orthodoxy from Judaism	"for his important achievement both in contemporary lyrical poetry and in the field of the great Russian epic tradition"
1961	Ivo Andrić	Yugoslavia (Born in Austria-Hungary)	Roman Catholic	"for the epic force with which he has traced themes and depicted human destinies drawn from the history of his country"
1962	John Steinbeck	United States	Episcopalian	"for his realistic and imaginative writings, combining as they do sympathetic humour and keen social perception"
1963	Giorgos Seferis	Greece (Born in the Ottoman Empire)	Greek Orthodox	"for his eminent lyrical writing, inspired by a deep feeling for the Hellenic world of culture"
1967	Miguel Ángel Asturias	Guatemala	Roman Catholic	"for his vivid literary achievement, deep-rooted in the national traits and traditions of Indian peoples of Latin America"
1970	Aleksandr Solzhenitsyn	Soviet Union	Eastern Orthodox	"for the ethical force with which he has pursued the indispensable traditions of Russian literature"
1972	Heinrich Böll	Germany (West)	Roman Catholic	"for his writing which through its combination of a broad perspective on his time and a sensitive skill in characterization has contributed to a renewal of German literature"
1979	Odysseas Elytis	Greece	Greek Orthodox	"for his poetry, which, against the background of Greek tradition, depicts with sensuous strength and intellectual clear-sightedness modern man's struggle for freedom and creativeness"
1980	Czesław Miłosz	Poland/United States	Roman Catholic	"who with uncompromising clear-sightedness voices man's exposed condition in a world of severe conflicts"
1982	Gabriel García Márquez	Colombia	Roman Catholic	"for his novels and short stories, in which the fantastic and the realistic are combined in a richly composed world of imagination, reflecting a continent's life and conflicts"
1989	Camilo José Cela	Spain	Roman Catholic	"for a rich and intensive prose, which with restrained compassion forms a challenging vision of man's vulnerability"
1990	Octavio Paz	Mexico	Roman Catholic	"for impassioned writing with wide horizons, characterized by sensuous intelligence and humanistic integrity"
1992	Derek Walcott	Saint Lucia	Protestant (Methodist)	"for a poetic oeuvre of great luminosity, sustained by a historical vision, the outcome of a multicultural commitment"
1993	Toni Morrison	United States	Roman Catholic	"who in novels characterized by visionary force and poetic import, gives life to an essential aspect of American reality"
1995	Seamus Heaney	Ireland (born Northern Ireland)	Roman Catholic	"for works of lyrical beauty and ethical depth, which exalt everyday miracles and the living past"
1999	Günter Grass	Germany (born Free City of Danzig now Gdańsk)	Roman Catholic	"whose frolicsome black fables portray the forgotten face of history"
2009	Herta Müller	Germany (Born in Romania)	Roman Catholic	"who, with the concentration of poetry and the frankness of prose, depicts the landscape of the dispossessed"
2011	Tomas Tranströmer	Sweden	Christian	"because, through his condensed, translucent images, he gives us fresh access to reality"
2016	Bob Dylan	United States	Born-again Christian	"for having created new poetic expressions within the great American song tradition"
2019	Peter Handke	Austria	Serbian Orthodox Church	"for an influential work that with linguistic ingenuity has explored the periphery and the specificity of human experience".
2023	Jon Fosse	Norway	Converted to Roman Catholicism	"for his innovative plays and prose which give voice to the unsayable"

== Peace ==
In an estimate by Baruch Shalev, between 1901 and 2000, about 78.3% of Nobel Peace Prize winners were either Christians or had a Christian background.

Year	Laureate		Country	Denomination	Rationale
1902		Élie Ducommun	Switzerland	Protestant	"for his role as the first honorary secretary of the International Peace Bureau"
1902		Charles Albert Gobat	Switzerland	Protestant	"for his role as the first Secretary General of the Inter-Parliamentary Union"
1903		William Randal Cremer	United Kingdom	Methodist	"for his role as the "first father" of the Inter-Parliamentary Union"
1905		Bertha von Suttner	Austria-Hungary	Roman Catholic	for authoring Lay Down Your Arms and contributing to the creation of the Prize
1906		Theodore Roosevelt	United States	Protestant (Dutch Reformed Church)	"for his successful mediation to end the Russo-Japanese war and for his interest in arbitration, having provided the Hague arbitration court with its very first case"
1907		Ernesto Teodoro Moneta	Italy	Roman Catholic	"for his work as a key leader of the Italian peace movement"
1907		Louis Renault	France	Roman Catholic	"for his work as a leading French international jurist and a member of the Permanent Court of Arbitration at The Hague"
1909		Auguste Beernaert	Belgium	Roman Catholic	"for being a representative to the two Hague conferences, and a leading figure in the Inter-Parliamentary Union"
1909		Paul Henri d'Estournelles de Constant	France	Protestant (Calvinist)	"for combined diplomatic work for Franco-German and Franco-British understanding with a distinguished career in international arbitration"
1912		Elihu Root^{[A]}	United States	Protestant (Presbyterian)	"for his strong interest in international arbitration and for his plan for a world court"
1919		Woodrow Wilson	United States	Protestant (Presbyterian)	"for his crucial role in establishing the League of Nations"
1921		Hjalmar Branting	Sweden	Lutheran (Church of Sweden)	"for his work in the League of Nations"
1921		Christian Lange	Norway	Lutheran (Church of Norway)	"for his work as the first secretary of the Norwegian Nobel Committee" and "the secretary-general of the Inter-Parliamentary Union"
1925		Austen Chamberlain^{[A]}	United Kingdom	Unitarian	"for work on the Locarno Treaties."
1925		Charles G. Dawes^{[A]}	United States	Protestant (Congregationalist)	"for work on the Dawes Plan for German reparations which was seen as having provided the economic underpinning of the Locarno Pact of 1925"
1926		Gustav Stresemann	Germany	Protestant	"for work on the Locarno Treaties."
1927		Ferdinand Buisson	France	Protestant	"for contributions to Franco-German popular reconciliation"
1930		Nathan Söderblom	Sweden	Lutheran (Church of Sweden)	"for his efforts to involve the churches not only in work for ecumenical unity, but also for world peace"
1931		Jane Addams	United States	Protestant (Presbyterian)	"for her social reform work and leading the Women's International League for Peace and Freedom"
1931		Nicholas Murray Butler	United States	Protestant (Episcopalian)	"for his promotion of the Briand-Kellogg pact" and for his work as the "leader of the more establishment-oriented part of the American peace movement"
1934		Arthur Henderson	United Kingdom	Protestant (Methodist)	"for his work for the League, particularly its efforts in disarmament"
1935		Carl von Ossietzky^{[B]}	Germany	Protestant (Lutheran)	"for his struggle against Germany's rearmament"
1945		Cordell Hull	United States	Protestant (Episcopalian)	"for his fight against isolationism at home, his efforts to create a peace bloc of states on the American continents, and his work for the United Nations Organization"
1946		Emily Greene Balch	United States	Quaker	"for her work with the Women's International League for Peace and Freedom"
1946		John Raleigh Mott	United States	Protestant (Methodist)	"for establishing and strengthening international Protestant Christian student organizations that worked to promote peace"
1947		Friends Service Council	United Kingdom	Quaker	"for their work in assisting and rescuing victims of the Nazis"
1947		American Friends Service Committee	United States	Religious Society of Friends (Quaker)	"for their work in assisting and rescuing victims of the Nazis"
1949		The Lord Boyd-Orr	United Kingdom	Protestant (Free Church of Scotland)	"for his scientific research into nutrition and his works as the first Director-General of the Food and Agriculture Organization"
1950		Ralph Bunche	United States	Protestant (Baptist)	"for his works in resolving the Arab-Israeli conflict in Palestine"
1952		Albert Schweitzer	France	Christian	"for his propagation for the reverence of life, the very foundations of a lasting peace between individuals, nations, and races"
1953		George Catlett Marshall	United States	Protestant (Episcopalian)	"for his work on the post-war European recovery"
1957		Lester Bowles Pearson	Canada	Protestant (United Church of Canada)	"for his role in helping end the Suez conflict and trying to solve the Middle East question through the United Nations";
1958		Dominique Pire	Belgium	Roman Catholic	"for his work in helping refugees in the post-World War II Europe"
1959		Philip Noel-Baker	United Kingdom	Quaker	"for his lifelong work for international peace and cooperation"
1960		Albert Lutuli	South Africa (Born in Southern Rhodesia)	Protestant (Methodist)	"for his role in the non-violent struggle against apartheid in South Africa"
1961		Dag Hammarskjöld^{[C]}	Sweden	Protestant (Lutheran)	"for strengthening the foundations of the United Nations Organization"
1964		Martin Luther King Jr.	United States	Protestant (Baptist; Progressive National Baptist Convention)	"for combating racial inequality through nonviolent resistance"
1970		Norman Borlaug	United States	Protestant	"for having given a well-founded hope - the green revolution"
1971		Willy Brandt	Germany (West)	Protestant (Lutheran)	"for his efforts to strengthen cooperation in Western Europe through the European Economic Community and to achieve reconciliation between West Germany and the other countries of Eastern Europe."
1974		Seán MacBride	Ireland (Born in France)	Roman Catholic	"for his strong interest in human rights by piloting the European Convention on Human Rights through the Council of Europe, helping found and then lead Amnesty International and serving as secretary-general of the International Commission of Jurists"
1976		Betty Williams	United Kingdom	Roman Catholic	"for their works as cofounders of Community of Peace People, an organization dedicated to promoting a peaceful resolution to the Troubles in Northern Ireland"
1976		Mairead Corrigan	United Kingdom	Roman Catholic	"for their works as cofounders of Community of Peace People, an organization dedicated to promoting a peaceful resolution to the Troubles in Northern Ireland"
1979		Mother Teresa	Albania (Born in Ottoman Kosovo)	Roman Catholic	"for her work undertaken in the struggle to overcome poverty and distress, which also constitutes a threat to peace"
1980		Adolfo Pérez Esquivel	Argentina	Roman Catholic	"for his efforts in the defense of human rights and for his opposition to Argentina's last civil-military dictatorship"
1982		Alfonso García Robles	Mexico	Roman Catholic	"for his magnificent work in the disarmament negotiations of the United Nations, where they have both played crucial roles and won international recognition"
1983		Lech Wałęsa	Poland	Roman Catholic	"for his contribution and considerable personal sacrifice to ensure the workers' right to establish their own organizations"
1984		Desmond Tutu	South Africa	Protestant (Anglican)	"for his role as a unifying leader-figure in the campaign to resolve the problem of apartheid in South Africa"
1987		Óscar Arias	Costa Rica	Roman Catholic	"for his work for peace in Central America, efforts which led to the accord signed in Guatemala on August 7 this year"
1993		Nelson Mandela	South Africa	Protestant (Methodist)	"for their work for the peaceful termination of the apartheid regime, and for laying the foundations for a new democratic South Africa"
1993		Frederik Willem de Klerk	South Africa	Protestant (Reformed)	"for their work for the peaceful termination of the apartheid regime, and for laying the foundations for a new democratic South Africa"
1996		Carlos Filipe Ximenes Belo	East Timor	Roman Catholic	"for their work towards a just and peaceful solution to the conflict in East Timor."
1996		José Ramos-Horta	East Timor	Roman Catholic	"for their work towards a just and peaceful solution to the conflict in East Timor."
1998		John Hume	United Kingdom	Roman Catholic	"for their efforts to find a peaceful solution to the conflict in Northern Ireland"
1998		David Trimble	United Kingdom	Protestant (Presbyterian)	"for their efforts to find a peaceful solution to the conflict in Northern Ireland"
2000		Kim Dae-jung	South Korea	Roman Catholic	"for his work for democracy and human rights in South Korea and in East Asia in general, and for peace and reconciliation with North Korea in particular"
2001	Kofi Annan, Photo: Harry Wad	Kofi Annan	Ghana	Protestant	"for his work for a better organized and more peaceful world"
2002		Jimmy Carter	United States	Protestant (Baptist)	"for his decades of untiring effort to find peaceful solutions to international conflicts, to advance democracy and human rights, and to promote economic and social development"
2004		Wangari Muta Maathai	Kenya	Roman Catholic	"for her contribution to sustainable development, democracy and peace"
2007		Al Gore	United States	Protestant (Baptist)	"for his efforts to build up and disseminate greater knowledge about man-made climate change, and to lay the foundations for the measures that are needed to counteract such change"
2008		Martti Ahtisaari	Finland	Protestant (Lutheran)	"for his efforts on several continents and over more than three decades, to resolve international conflicts"
2009		Barack Obama	United States	Protestant	"for his extraordinary efforts to strengthen international diplomacy and cooperation between peoples".
2011		Ellen Johnson Sirleaf	Liberia	Protestant (Methodist)	"for their non-violent struggle for the safety of women and for women's rights to full participation in peace-building work"
2011		Leymah Gbowee	Liberia	Protestant (Lutheran)	"for their non-violent struggle for the safety of women and for women's rights to full participation in peace-building work"
2016		Juan Manuel Santos	Colombia	Roman Catholic	"his resolute efforts to bring the country's more than 50-year-long civil war to an end, a war that has cost the lives of at least 220 000 Colombians and displaced close to six million people"
2018		Denis Mukwege	DRC	Pentecostal	"for [his] efforts to end the use of sexual violence as a weapon of war and armed conflict. Both laureates have made a crucial contribution to focusing attention on, and combating, such war crimes"
2019		Abiy Ahmed Ali	Ethiopia	Evangelical Pentecostal	"for his efforts to achieve peace and international cooperation, and in particular for his decisive initiative to resolve the border conflict with neighbouring Eritrea"
2022		Ales Bialiatski	Belarus	Roman Catholic	"The Peace Prize laureates represent civil society in their home countries. They have for many years promoted the right to criticise power and protect the fundamental rights of citizens. They have made an outstanding effort to document war crimes, human right abuses and the abuse of power. Together they demonstrate the significance of civil society for peace and democracy."

== Economics ==
In an estimate by Baruch Shalev, between 1901 and 2000, about 54.0% of Nobel Prize in Economics winners were either Christians or had a Christian background.

Year	Laureate	Country	Denomination	Rationale
1975	Tjalling Koopmans	Netherlands; United States	Protestant	"for his contributions to the theory of optimum allocation of resources"
1979	Theodore Schultz	United States	Protestant	"for their pioneering research into economic development research with particular consideration of the problems of developing countries."
1979	W. Arthur Lewis	Saint Lucia; United Kingdom	Roman Catholic	"for their pioneering research into economic development research with particular consideration of the problems of developing countries."
1982	George Stigler	United States	Christian	"for his seminal studies of industrial structures, functioning of markets and causes and effects of public regulation"
1988	Maurice Allais	France	Roman Catholic	"for his pioneering contributions to the theory of markets and efficient utilization of resources"
1989	Trygve Haavelmo	Norway	Protestant	"for his clarification of the probability theory foundations of econometrics and his analyses of simultaneous economic structures"
1996	William Vickrey	Canada; United States	Quaker	"for his fundamental contributions to the economic theory of incentives under asymmetric information"
2009	Elinor Ostrom	United States	Protestant	"for her analysis of economic governance, especially the commons"
2010	Christopher A. Pissarides	Cyprus	Eastern Orthodox	"for his analysis of markets with search frictions"
2013	Eugene F. Fama	United States	Roman Catholic	"for their empirical analysis of asset prices".
2013	Robert J. Shiller	United States	Protestant (Methodist)	"for their empirical analysis of asset prices".

== See also ==
- List of Nobel Peace Prize Laureates
- List of black Nobel Laureates
- List of Jewish Nobel laureates
- List of nonreligious Nobel laureates
- Nobel laureates of India
- List of Christian thinkers in science
- List of Nobel laureates by country
- List of Nobel laureates
- List of female Nobel laureates
- List of Catholic priests and religious awarded the Nobel Prize
