= Vieites =

Vieites is a surname. Notable people with the surname include:

- Fran Vieites (born 1999), Spanish footballer
- Moisés Vieites (1881–?), Cuban lawyer
