= List of Asian Nobel laureates =

The Nobel Prize is an annual, international prize first awarded in 1901 for achievements in Physics, Chemistry, Physiology or Medicine, Literature, and Peace. An associated prize in Economics has been awarded since 1969. Nobel Prizes have been awarded to over 800 individuals.

Asians have been the recipients of all six award categories: Physics, Chemistry, Physiology or Medicine, Literature, Peace, and Economics. The first Asian recipient, Rabindranath Tagore, was awarded the Literature Prize in 1913. In 1930, C. V. Raman became the first Asian recipient of a Nobel Prize in one of the sciences. The most Nobel Prizes awarded to Asians in a single year was in 2014, when five Asians became laureates. The most recent Asian laureates, Japanese chemist Kensō Soai and South African jurist Navi Pillay was awarded their prize in 2026.

To date (2026), there have been ninety-one Asian winners of the Nobel Prize, including thirty-four Japanese, fourteen Chinese (not including non-Chinese Laureates born in China), fourteen Israeli, and ten Indian (not including non-Indian Laureates born in India). The list does not include Russians.

== Physics ==
As of 2021, there are 21 Asians who have won the Nobel Prize in Physics, with the Japanese comprising the most with 12 laureates.

Year	Image	Laureate	Country at the time of the award	Category	Rationale
1930		C. V. Raman	British India	Physics	“for his work on the scattering of light and for the discovery of the effect named after him”
1949		Hideki Yukawa	Japan	Physics	“for his prediction of the existence of mesons on the basis of theoretical work on nuclear forces”
1957		Chen Ning Yang	Republic of China	Physics	“for their penetrating investigation of the so-called parity laws which has led to important discoveries regarding the elementary particles”
1957		Tsung-Dao Lee	Republic of China	Physics	“for their penetrating investigation of the so-called parity laws which has led to important discoveries regarding the elementary particles”
1965		Shin'ichiro Tomonaga	Japan	Physics	“for their fundamental work in quantum electrodynamics, with deep-ploughing consequences for the physics of elementary particles”
1973		Leo Esaki	Japan	Physics	“for their experimental discoveries regarding tunneling phenomena in semiconductors and superconductors, respectively”
1976		Samuel C. C. Ting	United States	Physics	“for their pioneering work in the discovery of a heavy elementary particle of a new kind”
1979		Abdus Salam	Pakistan	Physics	“for their contributions to the theory of the unified weak and electromagnetic interaction between elementary particles, including, inter alia, the prediction of the weak neutral current”
1983		Subrahmanyan Chandrasekhar	United States	Physics	“for his theoretical studies of the physical processes of importance to the structure and evolution of the stars”
1997		Steven Chu	United States	Physics	“for development of methods to cool and trap atoms with laser light”
1998		Daniel C. Tsui	United States	Physics	“for their discovery of a new form of quantum fluid with fractionally charged excitations”
2002		Masatoshi Koshiba	Japan	Physics	“for pioneering contributions to astrophysics, in particular for the detection of cosmic neutrinos”
2008		Yoichiro Nambu	United States	Physics	“for the discovery of the mechanism of spontaneous broken symmetry in subatomic physics”
2008		Makoto Kobayashi	Japan	Physics	“for the discovery of the origin of the broken symmetry which predicts the existence of at least three families of quarks in nature”
2008		Toshihide Maskawa	Japan	Physics	“for the discovery of the origin of the broken symmetry which predicts the existence of at least three families of quarks in nature”
2009		Charles K. Kao	United Kingdom and United States	Physics	“for groundbreaking achievements concerning the transmission of light in fibers for optical communication”
2014		Isamu Akasaki	Japan	Physics	“for the invention of efficient blue light-emitting diodes which has enabled bright and energy-saving white light sources”
2014		Hiroshi Amano	Japan	Physics	“for the invention of efficient blue light-emitting diodes which has enabled bright and energy-saving white light sources”
2014		Shuji Nakamura	United States	Physics	“for the invention of efficient blue light-emitting diodes which has enabled bright and energy-saving white light sources”
2015		Takaaki Kajita	Japan	Physics	“for the discovery of neutrino oscillations, which shows that neutrinos have mass”
2021		Syukuro Manabe	United States	Physics	“for the physical modelling of Earth’s climate, quantifying variability and reliably predicting global warming”

== Chemistry ==
As of 2026, there are 23 Asians who won the Nobel Prize in Chemistry, with the Japanese comprising the most with 11 laureates.

Year	Image	Laureate	Country at the time of the award	Category	Rationale
1981		Kenichi Fukui	Japan	Chemistry	“for their theories, developed independently, concerning the course of chemical reactions”
1986		Yuan T. Lee	Taiwan and United States	Chemistry	“for their contributions concerning the dynamics of chemical elementary processes”
1987		Charles J. Pedersen	United States	Chemistry	“for their development and use of molecules with structure-specific interactions of high selectivity”
2000		Hideki Shirakawa	Japan	Chemistry	“for the discovery and development of conductive polymers”
2001		Ryōji Noyori	Japan	Chemistry	“for their work on chirally catalysed hydrogenation reactions”
2002		Koichi Tanaka	Japan	Chemistry	“for their development of soft desorption ionisation methods for mass spectrometric analyses of biological macromolecules”
2004		Aaron Ciechanover	Israel	Chemistry	“for the discovery of ubiquitin-mediated protein degradation”
2004		Avram Hershko	Israel	Chemistry	“for the discovery of ubiquitin-mediated protein degradation”
2008		Osamu Shimomura	Japan	Chemistry	“for the discovery and development of the green fluorescent protein, GFP”
2008		Roger Y. Tsien	United States	Chemistry	“for the discovery and development of the green fluorescent protein, GFP”
2009		Venki Ramakrishnan	United Kingdom and United States	Chemistry	“for studies of the structure and function of the ribosome”
2009		Ada Yonath	Israel	Chemistry	“for studies of the structure and function of the ribosome”
2010		Ei-ichi Negishi	Japan	Chemistry	“for palladium-catalyzed cross couplings in organic synthesis”
2010		Akira Suzuki	Japan	Chemistry	“for palladium-catalyzed cross couplings in organic synthesis”
2011		Dan Shechtman	Israel	Chemistry	“for the discovery of quasicrystals”
2013		Arieh Warshel	Israel and United States	Chemistry	“for the development of multiscale models for complex chemical systems”
2013		Michael Levitt	Israel, United Kingdom and United States	Chemistry	“for the development of multiscale models for complex chemical systems”
2015		Aziz Sancar	Turkey and United States	Chemistry	“for mechanistic studies of DNA repair”
2019		Akira Yoshino	Japan	Chemistry	“for the development of lithium-ion batteries”
2024		Demis Hassabis	United Kingdom	Chemistry	“for protein structure prediction”
2025		Susumu Kitagawa	Japan	Chemistry	“for the development of metal–organic frameworks”
2025		Omar M. Yaghi	Jordan	Chemistry	“for the development of metal–organic frameworks”
2026		Kensō Soai	Japan	Chemistry	“for the discovery of non-linear effects and autocatalysis in asymmetric organic synthesis”

== Physiology or Medicine ==
As of 2025, there are 8 Asians who won Nobel Prize in Physiology or Medicine, with the Japanese comprising the most with 6 laureates.

Year	Image	Laureate	Country at the time of the award	Category	Rationale
1968		Har Gobind Khorana	United States	Physiology or Medicine	“for their interpretation of the genetic code and its function in protein synthesis”
1987		Susumu Tonegawa	Japan	Physiology or Medicine	“for his discovery of the genetic principle for generation of antibody diversity”
2012		Shinya Yamanaka	Japan	Physiology or Medicine	“for the discovery that mature cells can be reprogrammed to become pluripotent”
2015		Satoshi Ōmura	Japan	Physiology or Medicine	“for their discoveries concerning a novel therapy against infections caused by roundworm parasites”
2015		Tu Youyou	China	Physiology or Medicine	“for her discoveries concerning a novel therapy against Malaria”
2016		Yoshinori Ohsumi	Japan	Physiology or Medicine	“for his discoveries of mechanisms for autophagy”
2018		Tasuku Honjo	Japan	Physiology or Medicine	“for their discovery of cancer therapy by inhibition of negative immune regulation”
2025		Shimon Sakaguchi	Japan	Physiology or Medicine	“for their discoveries concerning peripheral immune tolerance”

== Literature ==
As of 2024, there are 10 Asians who won Nobel Prize in Literature, with the Japanese comprising the most with 3 laureates.

Year	Image	Laureate	Country at the time of the award	Category	Rationale
1913		Rabindranath Tagore	British India	Literature	“because of his profoundly sensitive, fresh and beautiful verse, by which, with consummate skill, he has made his poetic thought, expressed in his own English words, a part of the literature of the West”
1966		Shmuel Yosef Agnon	Israel	Literature	“for his profoundly characteristic narrative art with motifs from the life of the Jewish people”
1968		Yasunari Kawabata	Japan	Literature	“for his narrative mastery, which with great sensibility expresses the essence of the Japanese mind”
1994		Kenzaburō Ōe	Japan	Literature	“who with poetic force creates an imagined world, where life and myth condense to form a disconcerting picture of the human predicament today”
2000		Gao Xingjian	France	Literature	“for an œuvre of universal validity, bitter insights and linguistic ingenuity, which has opened new paths for the Chinese novel and drama”
2001		V. S. Naipaul	United Kingdom	Literature	“for having united perceptive narrative and incorruptible scrutiny in works that compel us to see the presence of suppressed histories”
2006		Orhan Pamuk	Turkey	Literature	“who in the quest for the melancholic soul of his native city has discovered new symbols for the clash and interlacing of cultures”
2012		Mo Yan	China	Literature	“who with hallucinatory realism merges folk tales, history and the contemporary”
2017		Kazuo Ishiguro	United Kingdom	Literature	“who, in novels of great emotional force, has uncovered the abyss beneath our illusory sense of connection with the world”
2024		Han Kang	South Korea	Literature	“for her intense poetic prose that confronts historical traumas and exposes the fragility of human life”

== Peace ==
As of 2026, there are 22 Asians who won Nobel Peace Prize, with the Israeli comprising the most with 3 laureates.

Year	Image	Laureate	Country at the time of the award	Category	Rationale
1973		Lê Đức Thọ (declined award)	North Vietnam	Peace	“for jointly having negotiated a cease fire in Vietnam in 1973”
1974		Eisaku Satō	Japan	Peace	“for his contribution to stabilize conditions in the Pacific rim area and for signing the Nuclear Non-Proliferation Treaty”
1978		Menachem Begin	Israel	Peace	“for jointly having negotiated peace between Egypt and Israel in 1978”
1989		Tenzin Gyatso, the 14th Dalai Lama	India, China and Tibet	Peace	“for advocating peaceful solutions based upon tolerance and mutual respect in order to preserve the historical and cultural heritage of his people”
1991		Aung San Suu Kyi	Burma	Peace	“for her non-violent struggle for democracy and human rights”
1994		Yasser Arafat	Palestine	Peace	“for their efforts to create peace in the Middle East”
1994		Shimon Peres	Israel	Peace	“for their efforts to create peace in the Middle East”
1994		Yitzhak Rabin	Israel	Peace	“for their efforts to create peace in the Middle East”
1996		Carlos Filipe Ximenes Belo	Timor-Leste	Peace	“for their work towards a just and peaceful solution to the conflict in East Timor”
1996		José Ramos-Horta	Timor-Leste	Peace	“for their work towards a just and peaceful solution to the conflict in East Timor”
2000		Kim Dae-jung	South Korea	Peace	“for his work for democracy and human rights in South Korea and in East Asia in general, and for peace and reconciliation with North Korea in particular”
2003		Shirin Ebadi	Iran	Peace	“for her efforts for democracy and human rights. She has focused especially on the struggle for the rights of women and children”
2006		Muhammad Yunus	Bangladesh	Peace	“for their efforts to create economic and social development from below”
2010		Liu Xiaobo	China	Peace	“for his long and non-violent struggle for fundamental human rights in China”
2011		Tawakkul Karman	Yemen	Peace	“for their non-violent struggle for the safety of women and for women's rights to full participation in peace-building work”
2014		Kailash Satyarthi	India	Peace	“for their struggle against the suppression of children and young people and for the right of all children to education”
2014		Malala Yousafzai	Pakistan	Peace	“for their struggle against the suppression of children and young people and for the right of all children to education”
2018		Nadia Murad	Iraq	Peace	“for their efforts to end the use of sexual violence as a weapon of war and armed conflict”
2021		Maria Ressa	Philippines	Peace	“for their efforts to safeguard freedom of expression, which is a precondition for democracy and lasting peace”
2023		Narges Mohammadi	Iran	Peace	“for her fight against the oppression of women in Iran and her fight to promote human rights and freedom for all”
2024		Nihon Hidankyo	Japan	Peace	“for its efforts to achieve a world free of nuclear weapons and for demonstrating through witness testimony that nuclear weapons must never be used again”
2026		Navi Pillay	South Africa	Peace	"for her efforts to promote peace and international law"

== Economics ==
As of 2025, there are seven Asians who won Nobel Prize in Economics, with the Israeli comprising the most with four laureates.

Year	Image	Laureate	Country at the time of the award	Category	Rationale
1998		Amartya Sen	India	Economics	“for his contributions to welfare economics”
2002		Daniel Kahneman	Israel and United States	Economics	“for having integrated insights from psychological research into economic science, especially concerning human judgment and decision-making under uncertainty”
2005		Robert Aumann	Israel and United States	Economics	“for having enhanced our understanding of conflict and cooperation through game-theory analysis”
2019		Abhijit Banerjee	United States	Economics	“for their experimental approach to alleviating global poverty”
2021		Joshua Angrist	Israel and United States	Economics	“for their methodological contributions to the analysis of causal relationships”
2024		Daron Acemoglu	Turkey and United States	Economics	“for studies of how institutions are formed and affect prosperity”
2025		Joel Mokyr	Israel, Holland and United States	Economics	“for having identified the prerequisites for sustained growth through technological progress”

== See also ==
- List of African Nobel laureates
- List of Latin American Nobel laureates
