= List of Jewish Nobel laureates =

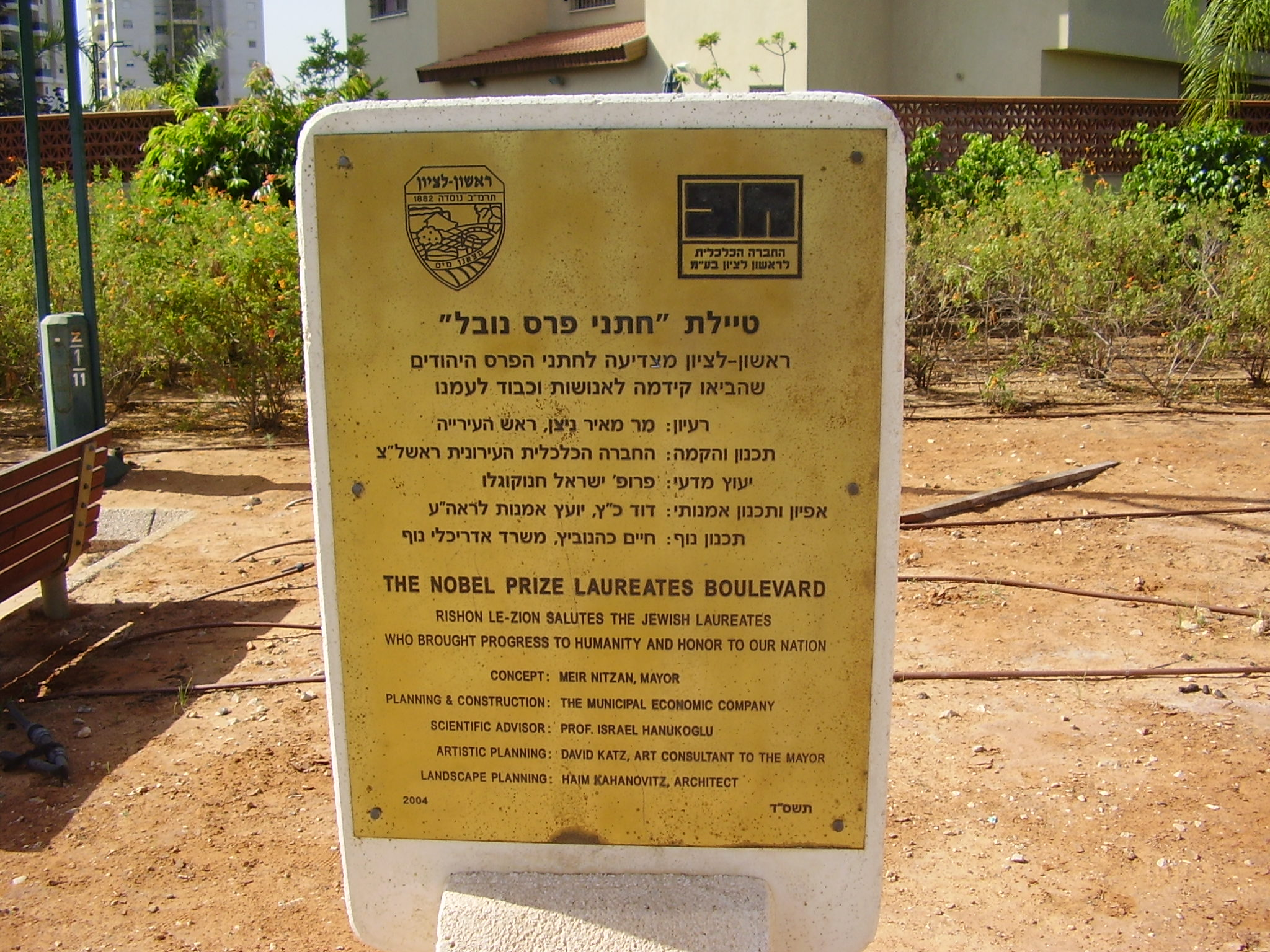
Sign on Nobel Laureates Boulevard in Rishon LeZion saluting Jewish Nobel laureates

Of the 965 individual recipients of the Nobel Prize and the Nobel Memorial Prize in Economic Sciences between 1901 and 2025, at least 220 have been Jews or people with at least one Jewish parent, representing 22% of all recipients. Jews constitute only 0.2% of the world's population, meaning their share of winners is 110 times their proportion of the world's population.

Jews have been awarded all six of the Nobel Foundation's awards:

- Chemistry: 38 (19% of total)
- Economics: 40 (40% of total)
- Literature: 17 (14% of total)
- Peace: 9 (8% of total)
- Physics: 56 (24% of total)
- Physiology or Medicine: 61 (26% of total)

Adolf von Baeyer, recipient of the 1905 Nobel Prize in Chemistry, was Jewish on his mother's side and is considered the first Jewish awardee.

Jewish laureates Elie Wiesel and Imre Kertész survived the extermination camps during the Holocaust. François Englert survived by being hidden in orphanages and children's homes. Others, such as Hans Bethe, Walter Kohn, Otto Stern, Albert Einstein, Hans Krebs and Martin Karplus, fled Nazi Germany to avoid persecution. Still others, including Rita Levi-Montalcini, Herbert Hauptman, Robert Furchgott, Arthur Kornberg, and Jerome Karle, experienced significant antisemitism in their careers.

Arthur Ashkin, a 96-year-old American Jew, was, at the time of his award, the oldest person to receive a Nobel Prize.

== Chemistry ==
Year	Laureate		Country	Rationale
1905		Adolf von Baeyer	Germany	"in recognition of his services in the advancement of organic chemistry and the chemical industry, through his work on organic dyes and hydroaromatic compounds"
1906		Henri Moissan	France	"[for his] investigation and isolation of the element fluorine, and for [the] electric furnace called after him"
1910		Otto Wallach	Germany	"[for] his services to organic chemistry and the chemical industry by his pioneer work in the field of alicyclic compounds"
1915		Richard Willstätter	Germany	"for his researches on plant pigments, especially chlorophyll"
1918		Fritz Haber	Germany	"for the synthesis of ammonia from its elements"
1943		George de Hevesy	Hungary	"for his work on the use of isotopes as tracers in the study of chemical processes"
1961		Melvin Calvin	United States	"for his research on the carbon dioxide assimilation in plants"
1962		Max Perutz	United Kingdom / Austria	"for their studies of the structures of globular proteins"
1972	Christian B. Anfinsen	Christian B. Anfinsen	United States	"for his work on ribonuclease, especially concerning the connection between the amino acid sequence and the biologically active conformation"
1972		William Howard Stein	United States	"for their contribution to the understanding of the connection between chemical structure and catalytic activity of the active centre of the ribonuclease molecule"
1977		Ilya Prigogine	Russia / Belgium	"for his contributions to non-equilibrium thermodynamics, particularly the theory of dissipative structures"
1979		Herbert C. Brown	United States / United Kingdom	"for their development of the use of boron- and phosphorus-containing compounds, respectively, into important reagents in organic synthesis"
1980		Paul Berg	United States	"for his fundamental studies of the biochemistry of nucleic acids, with particular regard to recombinant-DNA"
1980		Walter Gilbert	United States	"for their contributions concerning the determination of base sequences in nucleic acids"
1981		Roald Hoffmann	United States / Poland / Ukraine	"for their theories, developed independently, concerning the course of chemical reactions"
1982		Aaron Klug	United Kingdom / South Africa / Lithuania	"for his development of crystallographic electron microscopy and his structural elucidation of biologically important nucleic acid-protein complexes"
1985		Jerome Karle	United States	"for their outstanding achievements in developing direct methods for the determination of crystal structures"
1985	Herbert Hauptman	Herbert A. Hauptman	United States	"for their outstanding achievements in developing direct methods for the determination of crystal structures"
1986		John Polanyi	Hungary / Canada / Germany	"for his work in chemical kinetics.
1989		Sidney Altman	Canada / United States	"for their discovery of catalytic properties of RNA"
1992		Rudolph A. Marcus	United States / Canada	"for his contributions to the theory of electron transfer reactions in chemical systems"
1994	George Andrew Olah	George Andrew Olah	United States / Hungary	"for his contribution to carbocation chemistry"
1996		Harry Kroto	United Kingdom	"for the discovery of fullerenes"
1998	Walter Kohn	Walter Kohn	United States / Austria	"for his development of the density-functional theory"
2000		Alan J. Heeger	United States	"for the discovery and development of conductive polymers"
2004		Aaron Ciechanover	Israel	"for the discovery of ubiquitin-mediated protein degradation"
2004		Avram Hershko	Hungary / Israel	"for the discovery of ubiquitin-mediated protein degradation"
2004		Irwin Rose	United States	"for the discovery of ubiquitin-mediated protein degradation"
2006		Roger D. Kornberg	United States	"for his studies of the molecular basis of eukaryotic transcription"
2008		Martin Chalfie	United States	"for the discovery and development of the green fluorescent protein, GFP"
2009		Ada Yonath	Israel	"for studies of the structure and function of the ribosome"
2011		Dan Shechtman	Israel	"for the discovery of quasicrystals"
2012		Robert Lefkowitz	United States	"for studies of G-protein-coupled receptors"
2013		Arieh Warshel	Israel	"for the development of multiscale models for complex chemical systems"
2013		Michael Levitt	United States / United Kingdom / Israel / South Africa	"for the development of multiscale models for complex chemical systems"
2013		Martin Karplus	United States / Austria	"for the development of multiscale models for complex chemical systems"
2024		David Baker	United States	"for computational protein design"
2026		Henri B. Kagan	France	"for the discovery of non-linear effects and autocatalysis in asymmetric organic synthesis"

== Physiology or Medicine ==
Year	Laureate	Country	Rationale
1908	Élie Metchnikoff	Russia / Ukraine	"in recognition of their work on immunity"
1908	Paul Ehrlich	Germany	"in recognition of their work on immunity"
1914	Robert Bárány	Austria-Hungary	"for his work on the physiology and pathology of the vestibular apparatus"
1922	Otto Fritz Meyerhof	Germany	"for his discovery of the fixed relationship between the consumption of oxygen and the metabolism of lactic acid in the muscle"
1930	Karl Landsteiner	Austria	"for his discovery of human blood groups"
1931	Otto Heinrich Warburg	Germany	"for his discovery of the nature and mode of action of the respiratory enzyme"
1936	Otto Loewi	Austria / Germany	"for their discoveries relating to chemical transmission of nerve impulses"
1944	Joseph Erlanger	United States	"for their discoveries relating to the highly differentiated functions of single nerve fibres"
1945	Ernst Boris Chain	United Kingdom / Germany	"for the discovery of penicillin and its curative effect in various infectious diseases"
1946	Hermann Joseph Muller	United States	"for the discovery of the production of mutations by means of X-ray irradiation"
1947	Gerty Cori	United States / Austria-Hungary / Czechia	"for their discovery of the course of the catalytic conversion of glycogen"
1950	Tadeusz Reichstein	Switzerland / Poland	"for their discoveries relating to the hormones of the adrenal cortex, their structure and biological effects"
1952	Selman Waksman	United States / Russia / Ukraine	"for his discovery of streptomycin, the first antibiotic effective against tuberculosis"
1953	Hans Adolf Krebs	United Kingdom / Germany	"for his discovery of the citric acid cycle"
1953	Fritz Albert Lipmann	United States / Germany	"for his discovery of co-enzyme A and its importance for intermediary metabolism"
1958	Joshua Lederberg	United States	"for his discoveries concerning genetic recombination and the organization of the genetic material of bacteria"
1959	Arthur Kornberg	United States	"for their discovery of the mechanisms in the biological synthesis of ribonucleic acid and deoxyribonucleic acid"
1964	Konrad Emil Bloch	United States / Germany	"for their discoveries concerning the mechanism and regulation of the cholesterol and fatty acid metabolism"
1965	François Jacob	France	"for their discoveries concerning genetic control of enzyme and virus synthesis"
1965	André Michel Lwoff	France	"for their discoveries concerning genetic control of enzyme and virus synthesis"
1967	George Wald	United States	"for their discoveries concerning the primary physiological and chemical visual processes in the eye"
1968	Marshall Warren Nirenberg	United States	"for their interpretation of the genetic code and its function in protein synthesis"
1969	Salvador Luria	United States / Italy	"for their discoveries concerning the replication mechanism and the genetic structure of viruses"
1970	Julius Axelrod	United States	"for their discoveries concerning the humoral transmittors in the nerve terminals and the mechanism for their storage, release and inactivation"
1970	Bernard Katz	United Kingdom / Germany	"for their discoveries concerning the humoral transmittors in the nerve terminals and the mechanism for their storage, release and inactivation"
1972	Gerald Edelman	United States	"for their discoveries concerning the chemical structure of antibodies"
1975	David Baltimore	United States	"for their discoveries concerning the interaction between tumor viruses and the genetic material of the cell"
1975	Howard Martin Temin	United States	"for their discoveries concerning the interaction between tumor viruses and the genetic material of the cell"
1976	Baruch Samuel Blumberg	United States	"for their discoveries concerning new mechanisms for the origin and dissemination of infectious diseases"
1977	Rosalyn Sussman Yalow	United States	"for the development of radioimmunoassays of peptide hormones"
1978	Daniel Nathans	United States	"for the discovery of restriction enzymes and their application to problems of molecular genetics"
1980	Baruj Benacerraf	United States / Venezuela	"for their discoveries concerning genetically determined structures on the cell surface that regulate immunological reactions"
1982	John Vane	United Kingdom	along with Sune Bergström and Bengt Samuelsson for "their discoveries concerning prostaglandins and related biologically active substances".
1984	César Milstein	Argentina / United Kingdom	"for theories concerning the specificity in development and control of the immune system and the discovery of the principle for production of monoclonal antibodies"
1985	Michael Stuart Brown	United States	"for their discoveries concerning the regulation of cholesterol metabolism"
1985	Joseph L. Goldstein	United States	"for their discoveries concerning the regulation of cholesterol metabolism"
1986	Stanley Cohen	United States	"for their discoveries of growth factors"
1986	Rita Levi-Montalcini	Italy / United States	"for their discoveries of growth factors"
1988	Gertrude B. Elion	United States	"for their discoveries of important principles for drug treatment"
1989	Harold E. Varmus	United States	"for their discovery of the cellular origin of retroviral oncogenes"
1992	Edmond H. Fischer	United States / Switzerland	"for their discoveries concerning reversible protein phosphorylation as a biological regulatory mechanism"
1994	Alfred G. Gilman	United States	"for their discovery of G-proteins and the role of these proteins in signal transduction in cells"
1994	Martin Rodbell	United States	"for their discovery of G-proteins and the role of these proteins in signal transduction in cells"
1997	Stanley B. Prusiner	United States	"for his discovery of prions – a new biological principle of infection"
1998	Robert F. Furchgott	United States	"for their discoveries concerning nitric oxide as a signalling molecule in the cardiovascular system"
2000	Paul Greengard	United States	"for their discoveries concerning signal transduction in the nervous system"
2000	Eric Kandel	United States / Austria	"for their discoveries concerning signal transduction in the nervous system"
2002	Sydney Brenner	United Kingdom / South Africa	"for their discoveries concerning 'genetic regulation of organ development and programmed cell death'"
2002	H. Robert Horvitz	United States	"for their discoveries concerning 'genetic regulation of organ development and programmed cell death'"
2004	Richard Axel	United States	"for their discoveries of odorant receptors and the organization of the olfactory system"
2006	Andrew Fire	United States	"for his discovery of RNA interference – gene silencing by double-stranded RNA"
2011	Ralph M. Steinman	Canada / United States	for "his discovery of the dendritic cell and its role in adaptive immunity"
2011	Bruce Beutler	United States	"for their discoveries concerning the activation of innate immunity"
2013	James E. Rothman	United States	"for their discoveries of machinery regulating vesicle traffic, a major transport system in our cells"
2013	Randy Schekman	United States	"for their discoveries of machinery regulating vesicle traffic, a major transport system in our cells"
2017	Michael Rosbash	United States	"for their discoveries of molecular mechanisms controlling the circadian rhythm".
2020	Harvey J. Alter	United States	"for the discovery of Hepatitis C virus".
2021	David Julius	United States	"for their discoveries of receptors for temperature and touch".
2023	Drew Weissman	United States	"for their discoveries concerning nucleoside base modifications that enabled the development of effective mRNA vaccines against COVID-19".
2024	Gary Ruvkun	United States	“for the discovery of microRNA and its role in post-transcriptional gene regulation”.

== Physics ==
Year	Laureate	Country	Rationale
1907	Albert A. Michelson	United States / Germany / Poland	"for his optical precision instruments and the spectroscopic and metrological investigations carried out with their aid"
1908	Gabriel Lippmann	France / Luxemburg	"for his method of reproducing colours photographically based on the phenomenon of interference"
1921	Albert Einstein	Germany / Switzerland	"for his services to Theoretical Physics, and especially for his discovery of the law of the photoelectric effect"
1922	Niels Bohr	Denmark	"for his services in the investigation of the structure of atoms and of the radiation emanating from them"
1925	James Franck	Germany	"for their discovery of the laws governing the impact of an electron upon an atom"
1925	Gustav Hertz	Germany	"for their discovery of the laws governing the impact of an electron upon an atom"
1943	Otto Stern	United States / Germany	"for his contribution to the development of the molecular ray method and his discovery of the magnetic moment of the proton"
1944	Isidor Isaac Rabi	United States / Austria-Hungary / Poland	"for his resonance method for recording the magnetic properties of atomic nuclei"
1945	Wolfgang Pauli	Austria / United States	"for the discovery of the Exclusion Principle, also called the Pauli principle"
1952	Felix Bloch	United States / Switzerland	"for their development of new methods for nuclear magnetic precision measurements and discoveries in connection therewith"
1954	Max Born	United Kingdom / Germany	"for his fundamental research in quantum mechanics, especially for his statistical interpretation of the wavefunction"
1958	Ilya Frank	Soviet Union	"for the discovery and the interpretation of the Cherenkov effect"
1958	Igor Tamm	Soviet Union	"for the discovery and the interpretation of the Cherenkov effect"
1959	Emilio Gino Segrè	Italy / United States	"for their discovery of the antiproton"
1960	Donald A. Glaser	United States	"for the invention of the bubble chamber"
1961	Robert Hofstadter	United States	"for his pioneering studies of electron scattering in atomic nuclei and for his thereby achieved discoveries concerning the structure of the nucleons"
1962	Lev Landau	Soviet Union	"for his pioneering theories for condensed matter, especially liquid helium"
1963	Eugene Wigner	United States / Hungary	"for his contributions to the theory of the atomic nucleus and the elementary particles, particularly through the discovery and application of fundamental symmetry principles"
1965	Richard Feynman	United States	"for their fundamental work in quantum electrodynamics, with deep-ploughing consequences for the physics of elementary particles"
1965	Julian Schwinger	United States	"for their fundamental work in quantum electrodynamics, with deep-ploughing consequences for the physics of elementary particles"
1967	Hans Bethe	United States / Germany	"for his contributions to the theory of nuclear reactions, especially his discoveries concerning the energy production in stars"
1969	Murray Gell-Mann	United States	"for his contributions and discoveries concerning the classification of elementary particles and their interactions"
1971	Dennis Gabor	United Kingdom / Hungary	"for his invention and development of the holographic method"
1972	Leon Cooper	United States	"for his jointly developed theory of superconductivity, usually called the BCS-theory"
1973	Brian David Josephson	United Kingdom	"for his theoretical predictions of the properties of a supercurrent through a tunnel barrier, in particular those phenomena which are generally known as the Josephson effect"
1975	Aage Niels Bohr	Denmark	"for the discovery of the connection between collective motion and particle motion in atomic nuclei and the development of the theory of the structure of the atomic nucleus based on this connection"
1975	Ben Roy Mottelson	Denmark / United States	"for the discovery of the connection between collective motion and particle motion in atomic nuclei and the development of the theory of the structure of the atomic nucleus based on this connection"
1976	Burton Richter	United States	"for his pioneering work in the discovery of a heavy elementary particle of a new kind"
1978	Arno Allan Penzias	United States	"for his discovery of cosmic microwave background radiation"
1979	Sheldon Glashow	United States	"for their contributions to the theory of the unified weak and electromagnetic interaction between elementary particles, including, inter alia, the prediction of the weak neutral current"
1979	Steven Weinberg	United States	"for their contributions to the theory of the unified weak and electromagnetic interaction between elementary particles, including, inter alia, the prediction of the weak neutral current"
1981	Arthur Leonard Schawlow	United States	"for their contribution to the development of laser spectroscopy"
1987	Karl Alexander Müller	Switzerland	"for their important breakthrough in the discovery of superconductivity in ceramic materials"
1988	Leon M. Lederman	United States	"for the neutrino beam method and the demonstration of the doublet structure of the leptons through the discovery of the muon neutrino"
1988	Melvin Schwartz	United States	"for the neutrino beam method and the demonstration of the doublet structure of the leptons through the discovery of the muon neutrino"
1988	Jack Steinberger	United States / Germany	"for the neutrino beam method and the demonstration of the doublet structure of the leptons through the discovery of the muon neutrino"
1990	Jerome Isaac Friedman	United States	"for his pioneering investigations concerning deep inelastic scattering of electrons on protons and bound neutrons, which have been of essential importance for the development of the quark model in particle physics"
1992	Georges Charpak	France / Poland / Ukraine	"for his invention and development of particle detectors, in particular the multiwire proportional chamber"
1995	Martin Lewis Perl	United States	"'for the discovery of the tau lepton' and 'for pioneering experimental contributions to lepton physics'"
1995	Frederick Reines	United States	"'for the detection of the neutrino' and 'for pioneering experimental contributions to lepton physics'"
1996	David Morris Lee	United States	"for their discovery of superfluidity in helium-3"
1996	Douglas D. Osheroff	United States	"for their discovery of superfluidity in helium-3"
1997	Claude Cohen-Tannoudji	France / Algeria	"for development of methods to cool and trap atoms with laser light"
2000	Zhores Alferov	Russia / Belarus	"for developing semiconductor heterostructures used in high-speed- and optoelectronics"
2003	Alexei Alexeyevich Abrikosov	Russia / United States	"for pioneering contributions to the theory of superconductors and superfluids"
2003	Vitaly Ginzburg	Russia	"for pioneering contributions to the theory of superconductors and superfluids"
2004	David Gross	United States	"for the discovery of asymptotic freedom in the theory of the strong interaction"
2004	H. David Politzer	United States	"for the discovery of asymptotic freedom in the theory of the strong interaction"
2005	Roy J. Glauber	United States	"for his contribution to the quantum theory of optical coherence"
2011	Adam Riess	United States	"for the discovery of the accelerating expansion of the Universe through observations of distant supernovae"
2011	Saul Perlmutter	United States	"for the discovery of the accelerating expansion of the Universe through observations of distant supernovae"
2012	Serge Haroche	France / Morocco	"for ground-breaking experimental methods that enable measuring and manipulation of individual quantum systems"
2013	François Englert	Belgium	"for the theoretical discovery of a mechanism that contributes to our understanding of the origin of mass of subatomic particles, and which recently was confirmed through the discovery of the predicted fundamental particle, by the ATLAS and CMS experiments at CERN's Large Hadron Collider"
2016	J. Michael Kosterlitz	United Kingdom	"for discoveries in condensed-matter physics that have transformed the understanding of matter that assumes strange shapes"
2017	Rainer Weiss	United States / Germany	"for decisive contributions to the LIGO detector and the observation of gravitational waves"
2017	Barry Barish	United States	"for decisive contributions to the LIGO detector and the observation of gravitational waves"
2018	Arthur Ashkin	United States	"'for groundbreaking inventions in the field of laser physics', in particular 'for the optical tweezers and their application to biological systems'"
2020	Roger Penrose	United Kingdom	"for the discovery that black hole formation is a robust prediction of the general theory of relativity"
2020	Andrea Ghez	United States	"for the discovery of a supermassive compact object at the centre of our galaxy"
2025	Michel Devoret	France	"for the discovery of macroscopic quantum mechanical tunnelling and energy quantisation in an electric circuit"

== Literature ==
Year	Laureate	Country	Rationale
1910	Paul Heyse	Germany	"as a tribute to the consummate artistry, permeated with idealism, which he has demonstrated during his long productive career as a lyric poet, dramatist, novelist and writer of world-renowned short stories"
1927	Henri Bergson	France	"in recognition of his rich and vitalizing ideas and the brilliant skill with which they have been presented"
1958	Boris Pasternak	Soviet Union	"for his important achievement both in contemporary lyrical poetry and in the field of the great Russian epic tradition"
1966	Shmuel Yosef Agnon	Israel / Austria-Hungary / Ukraine	"for his profoundly characteristic narrative art with motifs from the life of the Jewish people"
1966	Nelly Sachs	Sweden / Germany	"for her outstanding lyrical and dramatic writing, which interprets Israel's destiny with touching strength"
1976	Saul Bellow	United States / Canada	"for the human understanding and subtle analysis of contemporary culture that are combined in his work"
1978	Isaac Bashevis Singer	United States / Poland	"for his impassioned narrative art which, with roots in a Polish-Jewish cultural tradition, brings universal human conditions to life"
1981	Elias Canetti	United Kingdom / Bulgaria	"for writings marked by a broad outlook, a wealth of ideas and artistic power"
1987	Joseph Brodsky	United States / Soviet Union	"for an all-embracing authorship, imbued with clarity of thought and poetic intensity"
1991	Nadine Gordimer	South Africa	"who through her magnificent epic writing has – in the words of Alfred Nobel – been of very great benefit to humanity"
2002	Imre Kertész	Hungary	"for writing that upholds the fragile experience of the individual against the barbaric arbitrariness of history"
2004	Elfriede Jelinek	Austria	"for her musical flow of voices and counter-voices in novels and plays that with extraordinary linguistic zeal reveal the absurdity of society's clichés and their subjugating power"
2005	Harold Pinter	United Kingdom	"who in his plays uncovers the precipice under everyday prattle and forces entry into oppression's closed rooms"
2014	Patrick Modiano	France	"for the art of memory with which he has evoked the most ungraspable human destinies and uncovered the life-world of the occupation"
2016	Bob Dylan	United States	"for having created new poetic expressions within the great American song tradition"
2020	Louise Glück	United States	"for her unmistakable poetic voice that with austere beauty makes individual existence universal."
2025	László Krasznahorkai	Hungary	“for his compelling and visionary oeuvre that, in the midst of apocalyptic terror, reaffirms the power of art”

== Economics ==
Year	Laureate	Country	Rationale
1970	Paul Samuelson	United States	"for the scientific work through which he has developed static and dynamic economic theory and actively contributed to raising the level of analysis in economic science"
1971	Simon Kuznets	United States / Russia	"for his empirically founded interpretation of economic growth which has led to new and deepened insight into the economic and social structure and process of development"
1972	Kenneth Arrow	United States	"for his pioneering contributions to general economic equilibrium theory and welfare theory"
1973	Wassily Leontief	Russia / Germany / United States	"for the development of the input-output method and for its application to important economic problems"
1975	Leonid Kantorovich	Soviet Union	"for his contributions to the theory of optimum allocation of resources"
1976	Milton Friedman	United States	"for his achievements in the fields of consumption analysis, monetary history and theory and for his demonstration of the complexity of stabilization policy"
1978	Herbert A. Simon	United States	"for his pioneering research into the decision-making process within economic organizations"
1980	Lawrence Klein	United States	"for the creation of econometric models and the application to the analysis of economic fluctuations and economic policies"
1985	Franco Modigliani	Italy / United States	"for his pioneering analyses of saving and of financial markets"
1987	Robert Solow	United States	"for his contributions to the theory of economic growth""
1990	Harry Markowitz	United States	"for their pioneering work in the theory of financial economics""
1990	Merton Miller	United States	"for their pioneering work in the theory of financial economics""
1992	Gary Becker	United States	"for having extended the domain of microeconomic analysis to a wide range of human behaviour and interaction, including nonmarket behaviour""
1993	Robert Fogel	United States	"for having renewed research in economic history by applying economic theory and quantitative methods in order to explain economic and institutional change"
1994	John Harsanyi	Hungary / United States	"for their pioneering analysis of equilibria in the theory of non-cooperative games"
1994	Reinhard Selten	Germany	"for their pioneering analysis of equilibria in the theory of non-cooperative games"
1997	Myron Scholes	Canada / United States	"for a new method to determine the value of derivatives"
1997	Robert C. Merton	United States	"for a new method to determine the value of derivatives"
2001	Joseph Stiglitz	United States	"for their analyses of markets with asymmetric information"
2001	George Akerlof	United States	"for their analyses of markets with asymmetric information"
2002	Daniel Kahneman	Israel / United States	"for having integrated insights from psychological research into economic science, especially concerning human judgment and decision-making under uncertainty"
2005	Robert Aumann	Israel / United States / Germany	"for having enhanced our understanding of conflict and cooperation through game-theory analysis"
2007	Leonid Hurwicz	United States / Poland / Russia	"for having laid the foundations of mechanism design theory"
2007	Eric Maskin	United States	"for having laid the foundations of mechanism design theory"
2007	Roger Myerson	United States	"for having laid the foundations of mechanism design theory"
2008	Paul Krugman	United States	"for his analysis of trade patterns and location of economic activity"
2009	Elinor Ostrom	United States	"for her analysis of economic governance, especially the commons"
2010	Peter Diamond	United States	"for his analysis of markets with search frictions"
2012	Alvin E. Roth	United States	"for the theory of stable allocations and the practice of market design"
2016	Oliver Hart	United States / United Kingdom	"contributions to contract theory"
2017	Richard Thaler	United States	"contributions have built a bridge between the economic and psychological analyses of individual decision-making"
2018	William Nordhaus	United States	"for integrating climate change into long-run macroeconomic analysis"
2019	Michael Kremer	United States	"for their experimental approach to alleviating global poverty"
2020	Paul Milgrom	United States	"for improvements to auction theory and inventions of new auction formats"
2021	Joshua Angrist	United States / Israel	"for their methodological contributions to the analysis of causal relationships"
2022	Ben Bernanke	United States	"for research on banks and financial crises"
2022	Douglas Diamond	United States	"for research on banks and financial crises"
2023	Claudia Goldin	United States	"for having advanced our understanding of women's labour market outcomes".
2025	Joel Mokyr	United States / Israel / Netherlands	“for having identified the prerequisites for sustained growth through technological progress”
2025	Philippe Aghion	France	“for the theory of sustained growth through creative destruction”

== Peace ==
Year	Laureate	Country	Rationale
1911	Tobias Michael Carel Asser	Netherlands	"Initiator of the Conferences on International Private Law at the Hague; Cabinet Minister; Lawyer"
1911	Alfred Hermann Fried	Austria	"Journalist; Founder of Die Friedenswarte"
1968	René Cassin	France	"President of the European Court for Human Rights"
1973	Henry Kissinger	United States / Germany	"For the 1973 Paris agreement intended to bring about a cease-fire in the Vietnam War and a withdrawal of the American forces"
1978	Menachem Begin	Israel / Russia / Poland	"for the Camp David Agreement, which brought about a negotiated peace between Egypt and Israel"
1986	Elie Wiesel	United States / Romania	"Chairman of The President's Commission on the Holocaust"
1994	Yitzhak Rabin	Israel	"to honour a political act which called for great courage on both sides, and which has opened up opportunities for a new development towards fraternity in the Middle East."
1994	Shimon Peres	Israel / Poland	"to honour a political act which called for great courage on both sides, and which has opened up opportunities for a new development towards fraternity in the Middle East."
1995	Joseph Rotblat	Poland / United Kingdom	"for his efforts to diminish the part played by nuclear arms in international politics and, in the longer run, to eliminate such arms"

== Forced to decline prize ==
Year	Laureate	Country	Rationale
1958	Boris Pasternak	USSR	Literature: "for his notable achievement in both contemporary poetry and the field of the great Russian narrative tradition". Pasternak initially accepted the award, but—after intense pressure from Soviet authorities—subsequently declined it.

== Jewish laureates per country ==
Below is a chart of all Jewish Nobel laureates per country, updated to include 2025 laureates.

Country	Number of Jewish Nobel laureates	Percent of laureates
United States	137	32.2%
Germany	29	25%
United Kingdom	20	13.9%
Israel	14	100%
Russia/Soviet Union	14	46.7%
Austria	12	48%
Poland	11	61.1%
France	11	14.1%
Hungary	11	57.9%
Canada	6	20.7%
Ukraine	5	83.3%
Switzerland	5	20%
South Africa	4	36.4%
Italy	4	19%
Denmark	3	21.4%
Belgium	2	18.2%
Netherlands	2	9.1%
Bulgaria	1	100%
Morocco	1	100%
Luxembourg	1	50%
Venezuela	1	50%
Algeria	1	50%
Lithuania	1	33.3%
Romania	1	25%
Argentina	1	20%
Belarus	1	16.7%
Czech Republic	1	16.7%
Sweden	1	2.9%

- Some laureates are counted more than once if they are citizens of more than one country.
- The column labelled "Percent of laureates" is the percentage of a country's total number of Jewish Nobel prize winners, i.e. a value of 100% means that every person from that country who won a Nobel prize was a Jew. As of 2025, the value for Israel is 100% which is not surprising given that the population is approximately 80% Jewish. The value for Bulgaria is also 100% because there has been one person who won a Nobel prize (and that person was a Jew). In contrast, there was only one Jewish laureate from Argentina, but the percent of Jewish laureates is 20% because there were a total of five laureates from Argentina.

== Nobel Laureates Boulevard ==
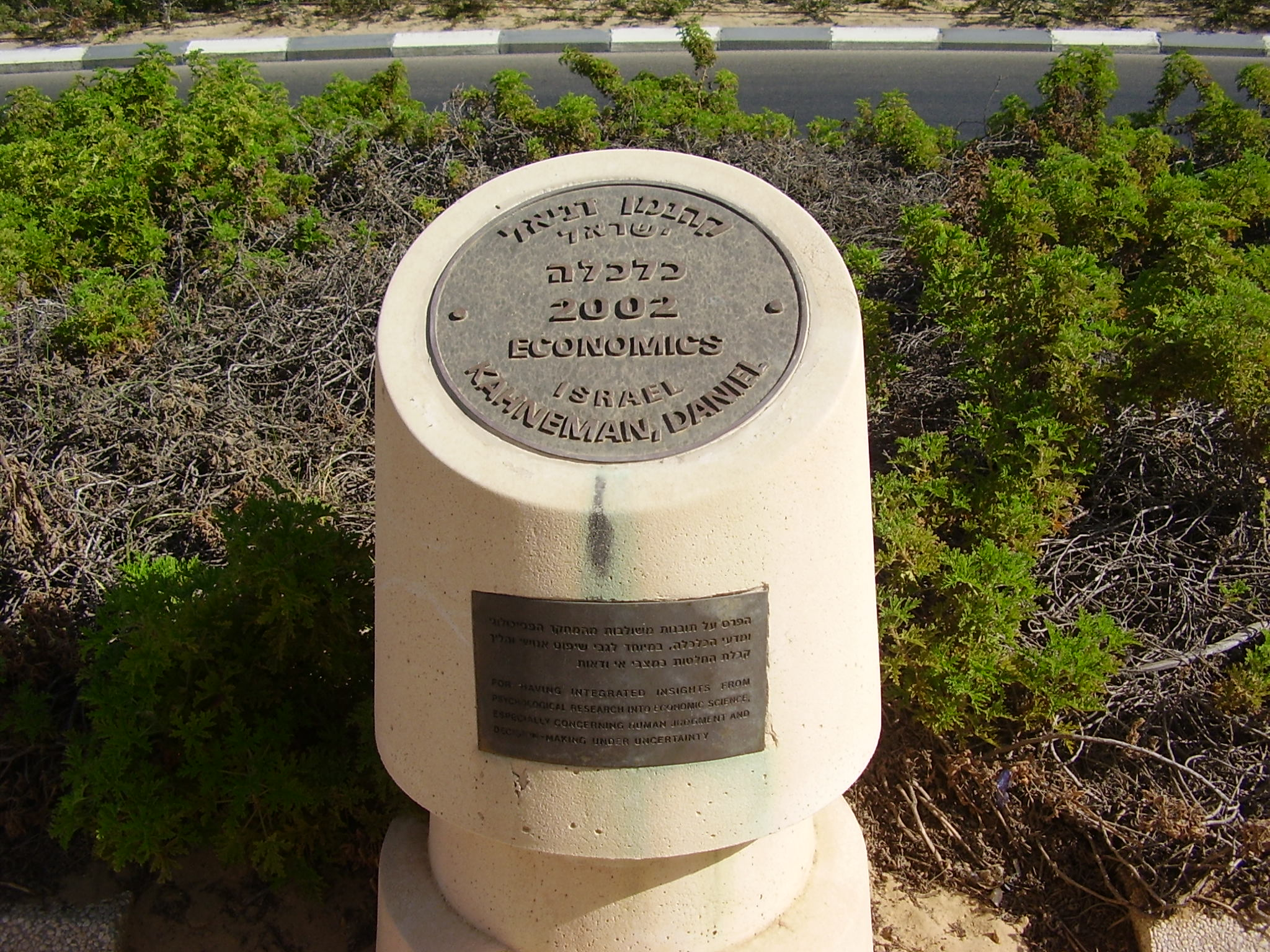
Monument and plaque honoring 2002 Economics Laureate Daniel Kahneman on Nobel Laureates Boulevard/Promenade in Rishon LeZion, Israel

The Israeli city of Rishon LeZion has an avenue dedicated to honoring all Jewish Nobel laureates. Tayelet Hatanei Pras Nobel ("Nobel Laureates Boulevard/Promenade") has a monument with attached plaque for each Nobel laureate. The scientific adviser of the project was Prof. Israel Hanukoglu.

== See also ==
- List of Nobel laureates
- List of Christian Nobel laureates
- List of black Nobel laureates
- List of Asian Nobel laureates
- List of Israeli Nobel laureates
