= List of Spanish Nobel laureates =

Since 1904, seven people born in Spain and one naturalized citizen of Spain have been awarded the Nobel Prize - six in the field of literature and two in medicine. Severo Ochoa was born in Spain, but he renounced his Spanish citizenship years before receiving the Nobel prize, to become an American citizen. The latest winner, Mario Vargas Llosa, is a Peruvian-Spanish dual national (he was not born in Spain, but he acquired Spanish citizenship in 1993). To date, only one Spanish citizen has received the Nobel prize in a scientific discipline (Santiago Ramon y Cajal, Medicine, 1906).

== Laureates ==
Year	Image	Winner	Field	Contribution
1904		José Echegaray	Literature	"in recognition of the numerous and brilliant compositions which, in an individual and original manner, have revived the great traditions of the Spanish drama"
1906		Santiago Ramón y Cajal	Medicine	"in recognition of their work on the structure of the nervous system"
1922		Jacinto Benavente	Literature	"for the happy manner in which he has continued the illustrious traditions of the Spanish drama"
1956		Juan Ramón Jiménez	Literature	"for his lyrical poetry, which in Spanish language constitutes an example of high spirit and artistical purity"
1959		Severo Ochoa	Medicine	"for their discovery of the mechanisms in the biological synthesis of ribonucleic acid and deoxyribonucleic acid"
1977		Vicente Aleixandre	Literature	"for a creative poetic writing which illuminates man's condition in the cosmos and in present-day society, at the same time representing the great renewal of the traditions of Spanish poetry between the wars"
1989		Camilo José Cela	Literature	"for a rich and intensive prose, which with restrained compassion forms a challenging vision of man's vulnerability"
2010		Mario Vargas Llosa	Literature	"for his cartography of structures of power and his trenchant images of the individual's resistance, revolt, and defeat"

== See also ==
- José Saramago, 1998 Nobel Prize in Literature, had Portuguese citizenship but was living in Spain since 1991.
