= List of Israeli Nobel laureates =

Citizens of Israel who were awarded the Nobel Prize

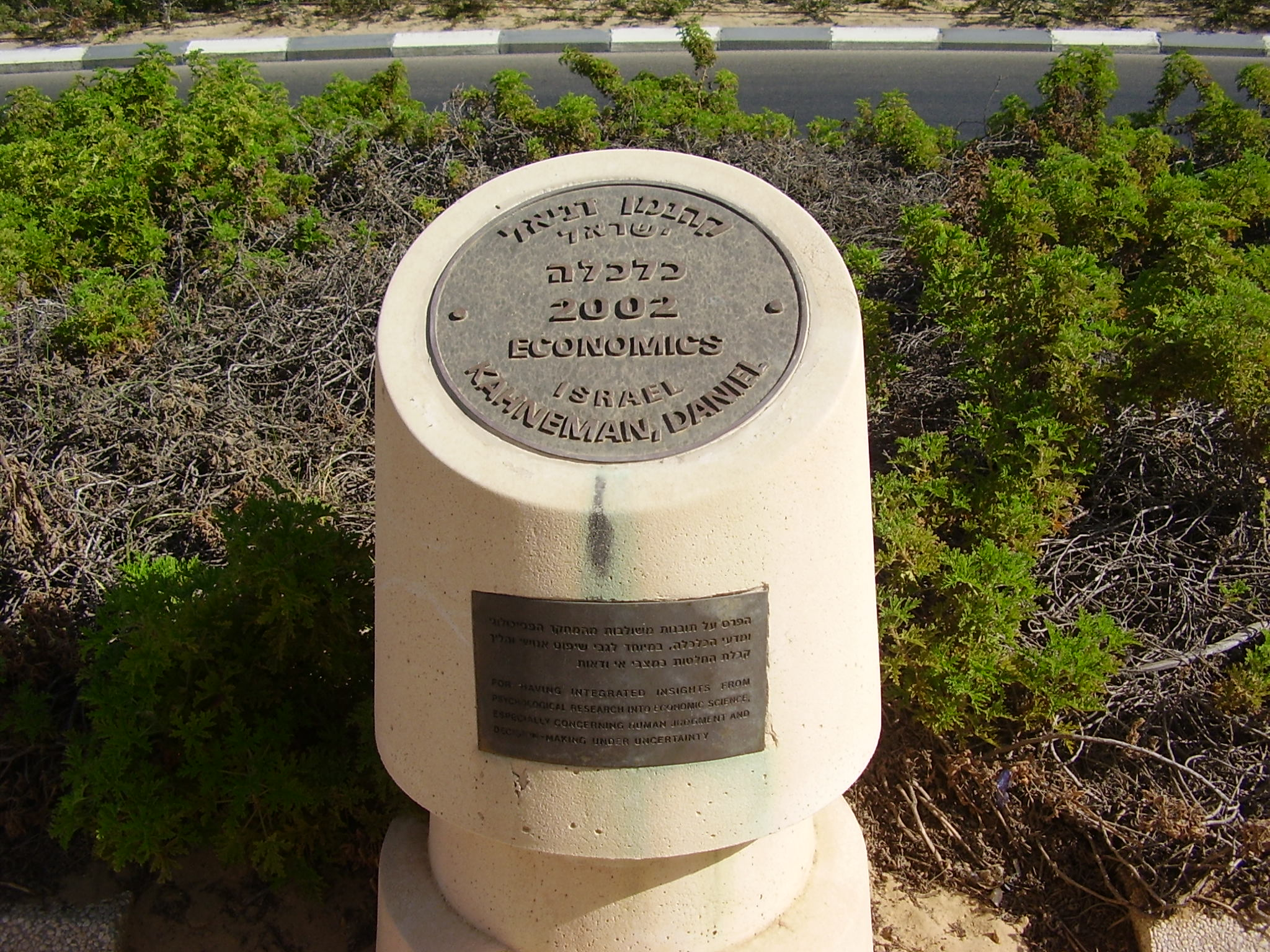
Monument honoring Daniel Kahneman on Nobel Laureates Promenade in Rishon LeZion, Israel

Since 1948, fourteen Israelis have been awarded the Nobel Prize, the most honorable award in various fields including chemistry, economics, literature and peace. Israel has more Nobel Prizes per capita than Germany, the United States and France. It has more laureates, in total, than India, China and Spain. Israel is 11th in Nobel prize per capita, just after the United Kingdom at 10th. If only scientific laureates are taken into account, Israel is 13th in Nobel prize per capita, just after Germany, 11th, and the United States, 12th.

== Laureates ==
The following is a complete list of Israeli Nobel laureates.

| Year | Laureate(s) | Prize motivation | Field |
|---|---|---|---|
| 1966 | Shmuel Yosef Agnon | "for his profoundly characteristic narrative art with motifs from the life of the Jewish people" | Literature |
| 1978 | Menachem Begin | "for the peace treaty concluded between Israel and Egypt" | Peace |
| 1994 | Shimon Peres | "for their efforts to create peace in the Middle East" | Peace |
| 1994 | Yitzhak Rabin | "for their efforts to create peace in the Middle East" | Peace |
| 2002 | Daniel Kahneman | "for having integrated insights from psychological research into economic science" | Economics |
| 2004 | Aaron Ciechanover | "for the discovery of ubiquitin-mediated protein degradation" | Chemistry |
| 2004 | Avram Hershko | "for the discovery of ubiquitin-mediated protein degradation" | Chemistry |
| 2005 | Robert Aumann | "for having enhanced our understanding of conflict and cooperation through game-theory analysis" | Economics |
| 2009 | Ada Yonath | "for studies of the structure and function of the ribosome" | Chemistry |
| 2011 | Dan Shechtman | "for the discovery of quasicrystals" | Chemistry |
| 2013 | Michael Levitt | "for the development of multiscale models for complex chemical systems" | Chemistry |
| 2013 | Arieh Warshel | "for the development of multiscale models for complex chemical systems" | Chemistry |
| 2021 | Joshua Angrist | "for their methodological contributions to the analysis of causal relationships" | Economics |
| 2025 | Joel Mokyr | “for having identified the prerequisites for sustained growth through technological progress” | Economics |

== See also ==
- List of countries by Nobel laureates
- List of Israel Prize recipients
- List of Jewish Nobel laureates
- List of Nobel laureates by country
