= List of Indian Nobel laureates =

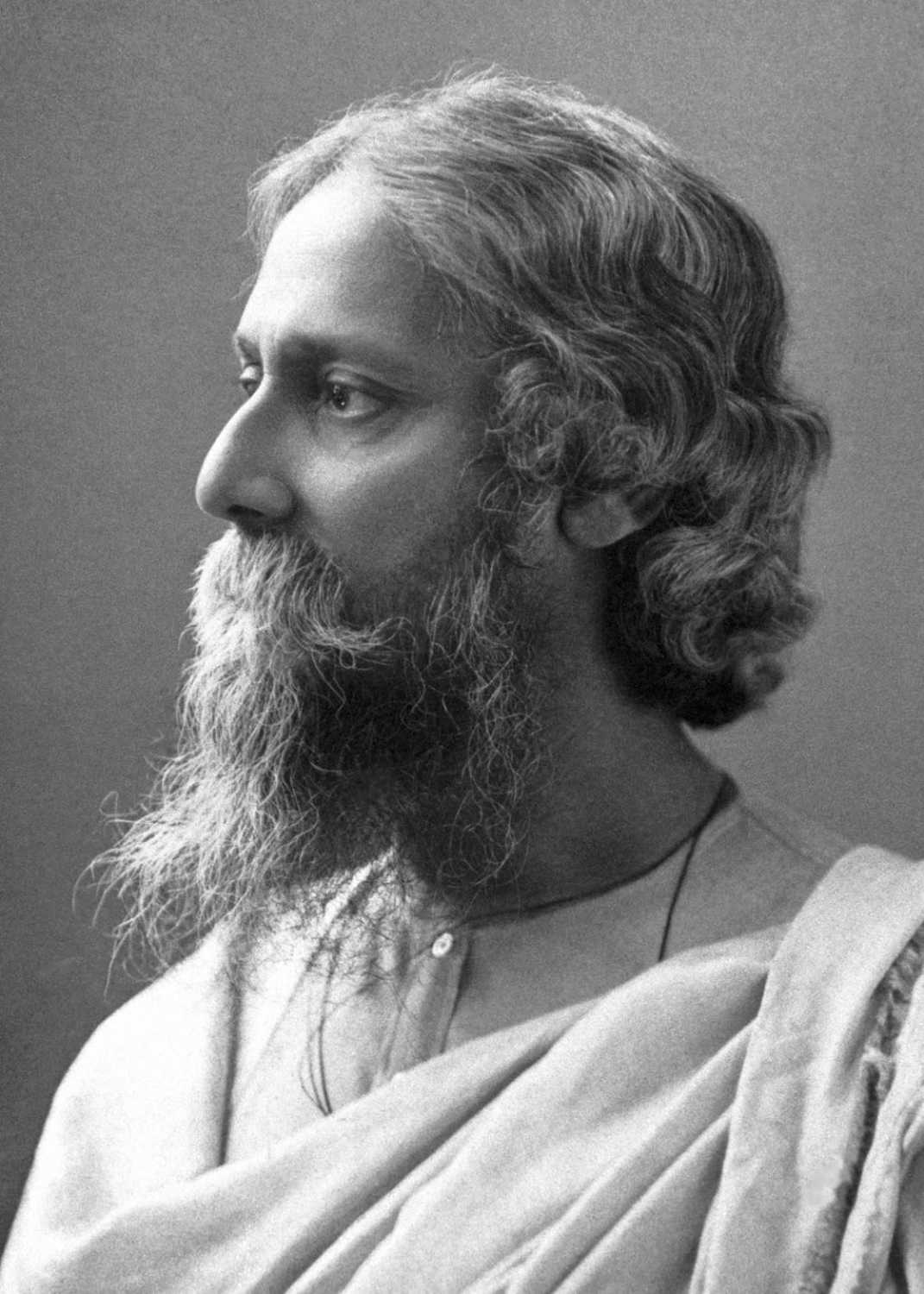
Rabindranath Tagore was the first Indian and also the first non-European and the first Asian to be awarded with the Nobel Prize. He received the prize for Literature in 1913.

The Nobel Prize is a set of annual international awards bestowed on "those who conferred the greatest benefit on humankind" in the fields of Physics, Chemistry, Physiology or Medicine, Literature, Peace and Economic Sciences, (Note: The Sveriges Riksbank Prize in Economic Sciences is an additional prize that was established in 1968 by the Bank of Sweden and was first awarded in 1969. Although not technically a Nobel Prize, it is identified with the award and the winners are announced with the Nobel Prize recipients, and the Prize in Economic Sciences is presented at the Nobel Prize Award Ceremony.) instituted by Alfred Nobel's last will, which specified that a part of his fortune be used to create the prizes. Each laureate (recipient) receives a gold medal, a diploma and a sum of money, which is decided annually by the Nobel Foundation. The Royal Swedish Academy of Sciences awards the Nobel Prize in Physics, the Nobel Prize in Chemistry and the Sveriges Riksbank Prize in Economic Sciences in Memory of Alfred Nobel; the Nobel Assembly at the Karolinska Institute awards the Nobel Prize in Physiology or Medicine; the Swedish Academy awards the Nobel Prize in Literature; and the Norwegian Nobel Committee awards the Nobel Peace Prize. They are widely recognised as one of the most prestigious honours awarded in the aforementioned fields.

First instituted in 1901, the Nobel Prize has been awarded to a total of 989 individuals (930 men and 59 women) and 30 organisations as of 2022. Among the recipients, 11 are Indians of which 5 are Indian citizens and 6 are of Indian ancestry or residency. Rabindranath Tagore was the first Indian citizen to be awarded and also the first non-European and the first Asian to be awarded in 1913. Sri Aurobindo, the Indian poet, philosopher, nationalist and developer of Integral yoga, was nominated unsuccessfully for the Nobel Prize in Literature in 1943 and for the Nobel Peace Prize in 1950.

On 1 December 1999, the Norwegian Nobel Committee confirmed that Mahatma Gandhi was nominated unsuccessfully for the Peace Prize five times (from 1937 to 1939, in 1947 and a few days before he was assassinated in January 1948). In 2006, Geir Lundestad, the Secretary of Norwegian Nobel Committee, cited it as "the greatest omission in our 106-year history".

== Laureates ==
The following are the Nobel laureates who were citizens of India at the time they were awarded the Nobel Prize. (Note: Per Indian nationality law, Article 9 of the Indian Constitution says that a person who voluntarily acquires citizenship of any other country is no longer an Indian citizen. Also, according to The Passports Act, a person has to surrender his Indian passport; it is a punishable offence under the act if he fails to surrender the passport. Hence, citizenship exclusively includes jus sanguinis (citizenship by right of blood).)

Year	Laureate		Field	Rationale	Ref.
1913	Black-and-white photographic portrait of Rabindranath Tagore taken in 1909	Rabindranath Tagore	Literature	"Because of his profoundly sensitive, fresh and beautiful verse, by which, with consummate skill, he has made his poetic thought, expressed in his own English words, a part of the literature of the West."	
1930	Black-and-white photographic portrait of Sir CV Raman	C. V. Raman	Physics	"For his work on the scattering of light and for the discovery of the effect named after him."	
1979	Photographic portrait of Mother Teresa captured in 1994	Mother Teresa (Note: Born in Skopje, Ottoman Empire)	Peace	"In recognition of [her] work in bringing help to suffering humanity."	
1998	Picture of Amartya Sen	Amartya Sen	Economic Sciences	"For his contributions to welfare economics."	
2014	Photographic portrait of Kailash Satyarthi	Kailash Satyarthi (Note: shared with Malala Yousafzai)	Peace	"For their struggle against the suppression of children and young people and for the right of all children to education."	

=== Overseas citizens of Indian origin ===
The following are not Indians, but rather Nobel laureates born in British India or laureates who are of Indian origin but subsequently non-citizens of India; however, they are still often included in lists of Indian Nobel laureates.

Year	Laureate		Country of residence	Field	Rationale	Ref.
1968	Black-and-white photographic portrait of Har Gobind Khorana	Har Gobind Khorana (Note: shared with Robert W. Holley and Marshall W. Nirenberg)	United States (born in Raipur, British India, now Pakistan)	Physiology or Medicine	"For his interpretation of the genetic code and its function in protein synthesis."	
1983	Black-and-white photographic portrait of Subrahmanyan Chandrasekhar	Subrahmanyan Chandrasekhar	United States (born in Lahore, British India, now Pakistan)	Physics	"For his theoretical studies of the physical processes of importance to the structure and evolution of the stars."	
2009	Photographic portrait of Venkatraman Ramakrishnan	Venki Ramakrishnan	United Kingdom / United States (born in Chidambaram, India)	Chemistry	"For studies of the structure and function of the ribosome."	
2019	Photographic portrait of Abhijit Banerjee	Abhijit Banerjee	United States (born in Krishnanagar, India)	Economics	"For his experimental approach to alleviating Global Poverty"	

=== Other ===
The following are Nobel laureates with Indian linkages – foreigners who were born in India, those who are of Indian ancestry and those who were residents in India when they became recipients of the Nobel Prize.

Year	Laureate		Country of residence	Field	Rationale	Ref
1902	Black-and-white photographic portrait of Ronald Ross	Ronald Ross	United Kingdom (born in Almora, British India)	Physiology or Medicine	"For his work on malaria, by which he has shown how it enters the organism and thereby has laid the foundation for successful research on this disease and methods of combating it."	
1907	Black-and-white photographic portrait of Rudyard Kipling	Rudyard Kipling	United Kingdom (born in Bombay, British India)	Literature	"In consideration of the power of observation, originality of imagination, virility of ideas and remarkable talent for narration which characterize the creations of this world-famous author."	
1989	Photographic portrait of Dalai Lama	14th Dalai Lama	India (born in Taktser, Republic of China)	Peace	"For his consistent resistance to the use of violence in his people’s struggle to regain their liberty."	
2001	Photograph of VS Naipal taken in 2016	V. S. Naipaul	United Kingdom (born in Chaguanas, British Trinidad and Tobago)	Literature	"For having united perceptive narrative and incorruptible scrutiny in works that compel us to see the presence of suppressed histories."	
2026	Photograph of Navi Pillay taken in 2014	Navi Pillay	South Africa (born in Durban, Union of South Africa)	Peace	"For her efforts to promote peace and international law."	

=== Members of laureate organizations ===
The following Indian individuals were significant members who contributed largely in making a larger organization become a Nobel laureate.

Year	Image	Individual/ organization	Born	Died	Laureate organization	Citation
2007		Rajendra K. Pachauri (Note: Pachauri was the Chairman of the Intergovernmental Panel on Climate Change when it won the 2007 Nobel Peace Prize with United States Vice President Al Gore.)	20 August 1940; Nainital, British India	13 February 2020; New Delhi, India	Intergovernmental Panel on Climate Change	"for their efforts to build up and disseminate greater knowledge about man-made climate change, and to lay the foundations for the measures that are needed to counteract such change."

== See also ==
- List of Nobel laureates
- List of Nobel laureates by country
- List of Asian Nobel laureates
