= List of African Nobel laureates =

The Nobel Prize is an international prize awarded annually since 1901 for achievements in Physics, Chemistry, Physiology or Medicine, Literature, and Peace. An associated prize in Economic Sciences has been awarded since 1969. Nobel Prizes have been awarded to over 800 individuals.

Africans have received awards in all five of the Nobel prize categories: Peace, Physics, Physiology or Medicine, Literature, and Chemistry. The first Black African recipient, Albert Luthuli, was awarded the Peace Prize in 1960 and the first White African who received the prize was Max Theiler in 1951 for Physiology or Medicine. The most recent African recipient, Navi Pillay, received the prize in 2026.

A notable recipient of the Nobel Peace Prize is Nelson Mandela (1918–2013) the first democratically elected president of South Africa, who played a key role in the repeal of apartheid laws. He was awarded the Nobel Peace Prize in 1993 alongside President F.W. de Klerk.

Two African laureates, Anwar Sadat of Egypt in 1978 and F.W. de Klerk of South Africa in 1993, were presidents of their countries at the time they were awarded the Nobel Prize. Sadat was honored along with Israeli prime minister Menachem Begin for their efforts to reach a peace agreement between their two countries. DeKlerk was awarded the Nobel Peace Prize along with Nelson Mandela, who led the ANC but was not president of South Africa until 1994.

== Laureates ==
Year	Image	Name	Country	Category	Comment
1951		Max Theiler	South Africa	Physiology or Medicine	First White African to win a Nobel Prize
1957		Albert Camus	France (born in Algeria)	Literature	First White African to win a Nobel Prize in Literature
1960		Albert Luthuli	South Africa (born in Zimbabwe)	Peace	First Black African to win a Nobel Prize
1978		Anwar El Sadat	Egypt	Peace	First Egyptian and North African to win a Nobel Prize
1979		Allan M. Cormack	South Africa	Physiology or Medicine	
1982		Aaron Klug	South Africa	Chemistry	
1984		Desmond Tutu	South Africa	Peace	
1985		Claude Simon	France (born in Madagascar)	Literature	
1986		Wole Soyinka	Nigeria	Literature	First Black African person to win the Nobel Prize for Literature
1988		Naguib Mahfouz	Egypt	Literature	First Egyptian and North African to win a Nobel Prize in Literature
1991		Nadine Gordimer	South Africa	Literature	First White African woman to win a Nobel Prize
1993		Nelson Mandela	South Africa	Peace	
1993		F. W. de Klerk	South Africa	Peace	
1997		Claude Cohen-Tannoudji	France (born in Algeria)	Physics	
1999		Ahmed Zewail	Egypt	Chemistry	First Egyptian and North African to win a Nobel Prize in Chemistry.
2001		Kofi Annan	Ghana	Peace	
2002		Sydney Brenner	South Africa	Physiology or Medicine	
2003		J. M. Coetzee	South Africa	Literature	
2004		Wangari Maathai	Kenya	Peace	First Black African woman to win a Nobel Prize
2005		Mohamed ElBaradei	Egypt	Peace	
2007		Doris Lessing	Zimbabwe (born in Iran)	Literature	
2008		J. M. G. Le Clézio	Mauritius (born in France)	Literature	
2011		Ellen Johnson Sirleaf	Liberia	Peace	
2011		Leymah Gbowee	Liberia	Peace	
2012		Serge Haroche	France (born in Morocco)	Physics	
2013		Michael Levitt	South Africa	Chemistry	
2015		Tunisian National Dialogue Quartet	Tunisia	Peace	
2018		Denis Mukwege	Democratic Republic of the Congo	Peace	
2019		Abiy Ahmed	Ethiopia	Peace	
2021		Abdulrazak Gurnah	Tanzania	Literature	
2026	High Commissioner Navy Pillay at the 26th session of the Human Rights Council.	Navi Pillay	South Africa	Peace	
