= Moisés Vieites =

Moisés Almeida-Vieites
- Born: 1881; Havana, Captaincy General of Cuba, Spanish Empire
- Occupation: Lawyer

Moisés Almeida-Vieites was a lawyer, judicial writer, and Doctor in law from Havana, Cuba. He was a member of the bar association, and a counselor to both the Centro Gallego, and the Merchants Aid Association in that city.

== Bibliography ==
- Vieites, Moisés (1929). Como debe ser la llamada ley penal: informe que expone a la consideración de la Camara de Representantes. s.n. p. 382.
- Vieites, Moisés (1933). El aborto a través de la moral y de la ley penal. Reus. p. 50.
- Vieites, Moisés (1935). Mi contribución al actual proyecto de reforma penal en Cuba. F. Verdugo. p. 259.
- Vieites, Moisés (1937). Sobre la pena de muerte: posición de los profesores Ferri, Carmignani, Romagnosi, Tarde, Lombroso y Arenal en el problema. Talleres tipográficos de F. Verdugo. p. 99.
- Vieites, Moisés (1922). Código penal para la República de Cuba. p. 32.
- Vieites, Moisés (1899). Al desnudo. Imprenta Obrapia.
- Vieites, Moisés (1923). Monografía acerca de la Catedral de Palencia.
- Vieites, Moisés (1917). Derecho y procedimientos criminales con especial relación a la esfera y límites ante jurados. p. 25.
