= Lists of Nobel laureates =

List of lists

One of the Nobel Prize medals in Physiology or Medicine awarded in 1950

Lists of Nobel laureates cover winners of Nobel Prizes for outstanding contributions for humanity in chemistry, literature, peace, physics, and physiology or medicine. The lists are organized by prize, by ethnicity, by origination and by nationality.

== General ==
- List of Nobel laureates, the general list
- List of heads of government and state Nobel laureates
- List of Nobel laureates by university affiliation
- List of couples awarded the Nobel Prize

== By prize ==
- List of Nobel laureates in Chemistry
- List of Nobel Memorial Prize laureates in Economics
- List of Nobel laureates in Literature
- List of Nobel Peace Prize laureates
- List of Nobel laureates in Physics
- List of Nobel laureates in Physiology or Medicine

== By laureate identity ==
- List of female Nobel laureates
- List of black Nobel laureates
- List of Latin American Nobel laureates
- List of Christian Nobel laureates
- List of Jewish Nobel laureates
- List of nonreligious Nobel laureates

== By origin ==
- List of countries by Nobel laureates per capita
- List of Nobel laureates by country
- List of Asian Nobel laureates
- List of African Nobel laureates

== By nationality ==
- List of American Nobel laureates
- List of Argentine Nobel laureates
- List of Armenian Nobel laureates
- List of Australian Nobel laureates
- List of Belgian Nobel laureates
- List of Brazilian Nobel laureates and nominees
- List of Chinese Nobel laureates
- List of Danish Nobel laureates
- List of Egyptian Nobel laureates and nominees
- List of Filipino Nobel laureates and nominees
- List of German Nobel laureates
- List of Greek Nobel laureates and nominees
- List of Hungarian Nobel laureates
- List of Indian Nobel laureates
- List of Irish Nobel laureates and nominees
- List of Israeli Nobel laureates
- List of Italian Nobel laureates
- List of Japanese Nobel laureates and nominees
- List of Korean Nobel laureates and nominees
- List of Mexican Nobel laureates and nominees
- List of Pakistani Nobel laureates
- List of Polish Nobel laureates
- List of Romanian Nobel laureates and nominees
- List of Russian Nobel laureates
- List of South African Nobel laureates and nominees
- List of Spanish Nobel laureates
- List of Swedish Nobel laureates
- List of Swiss Nobel laureates
- List of Venezuelan Nobel laureates
- List of Vietnamese Nobel laureates and nominees
- List of Welsh Nobel laureates

== See also ==
- Clarivate Citation Laureates
