= 1973 Nobel Peace Prize =

- Henry Kissinger and Lê Đức Thọ
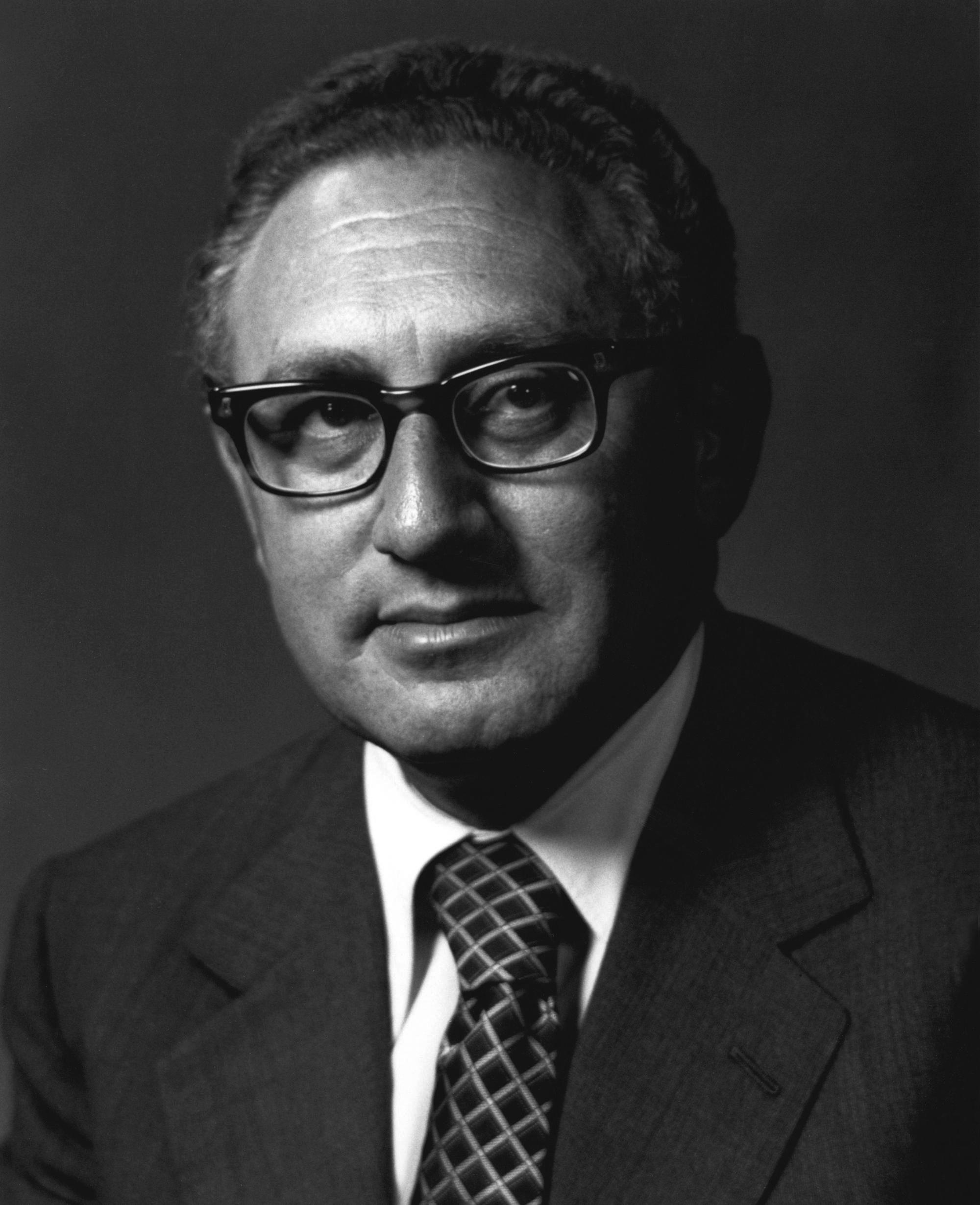
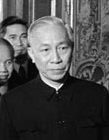
- Henry Kissinger (left) and Lê Đức Thọ (right) "for jointly having negotiated a cease fire in Vietnam in 1973"
- Date: 16 October 1973 (announced); 10 December 1973 (ceremony)
- Presented by: Norwegian Nobel Committee
- First award: 1901
- Website: Official website

The 1973 Nobel Peace Prize was awarded jointly to United States secretary of state Henry Kissinger and Worker's Party of Vietnam Politburo representative Lê Đức Thọ "for jointly having negotiated a cease fire in Vietnam in 1973". Thọ declined to accept the prize, and Kissinger accepted in absentia as he did not want to be targeted by anti-war protestors at the event. Kissinger later tried to return the award, but the committee declined his offer.

The 1973 Nobel Peace Prize is often cited as one of, if not the most, controversial in the history of the award. Two members of the Norwegian Nobel Committee resigned in protest, The New York Times referred to it as the "Nobel War Prize", and Tom Lehrer stated, "Political satire became obsolete when Henry Kissinger was awarded the Nobel Peace Prize."

== Award ==
=== Background ===
Henry Kissinger and Lê Đức Thọ had respectively been the United States and North Vietnamese representatives at discussions beginning in 1968 in Paris, France which aimed to put an end to the Vietnam War. On 26 October 1972, Kissinger held a press conference in Washington, D.C. in which he declared, "Peace is at hand." On 27 January 1973, the Paris Peace Accords were signed. Under the agreement, direct American intervention in the conflict was ended and the remaining U.S. troops were to be withdrawn from Vietnam in exchange for a ceasefire and the cessation of conflict between North and South Vietnam. However, the agreement was not ratified by the United States Senate, and fighting restarted before American soldiers left the country. Additionally, South Vietnam had not been consulted on the terms of the agreement, and in fact had not even been informed that negotiations had resumed. The South Vietnamese government subsequently refused to accept the accords, and North and South Vietnamese forces both frequently broke the terms of the agreement.

=== Announcement ===
On 16 October 1973, the Norwegian Nobel Committee held a meeting at which it decided to give the 1973 Nobel Peace Prize to Kissinger and Thọ for their roles in negotiating the Paris Peace Accords. The committee announced its decision later that day. Thọ was the first Asian chosen for the award. Two dissenting committee members, Einar Hovdhaugen and Helge Rognlien, resigned in protest of the decision.

=== Reactions ===
International responses were strongly polarized, especially regarding the decision to award Kissinger. Controversy focused on his role in orchestrating the secret bombing of Cambodia, as well as his involvement in planning or aiding events that were deemed antithetical to the principles of the Peace Prize, such as Operation Condor, the Bangladesh Liberation War supporting the Pakistani army, and just a month earlier, the 1973 Chilean coup d'état. At the time the award was given, fighting was still ongoing in Vietnam.

In the United States, reactions were widely derisive. The New York Times published an editorial dubbing it the "Nobel War Prize", describing the award as "at the very least, premature". Diplomat George Ball was quoted as saying, "The Norwegians must have a sense of humour." Ernest Cuneo lambasted the decision to award Kissinger and Thọ while conflict was still ongoing, sarcastically writing in an editorial that the award "can only mean Prime Minister Neville Chamberlain and Chancellor Adolf Hitler were most cruelly overlooked for the same award in 1938." In Norway, the Nobel Committee was subject to widespread criticism, with the Norwegian Arbeiderbladet newspaper calling the award a "bad joke" and stating, "The Norwegian Nobel Committee has disgraced itself". In a joint letter to the Norwegian Parliament, multiple Harvard professors wrote that awarding Kissinger and Thọ was "more than a person with a normal sense of justice can take". For only the second time in history, Norwegian Nobel Committee members resigned as a result of the decision; the first time being in 1935 in response to giving the award to Carl von Ossietzky. (Note: At the time, there has since been a third instance as the 1994 Nobel Peace Prize award to Yasser Arafat also prompted the withdrawal of a committee member.)

Kissinger himself contemplated declining the prize, as he considered Thọ's nomination to be an affront. He is quoted as saying to Soviet ambassador Anatoly Dobrynin, "I figure it like Groucho Marx said, 'any club that took him in he would not want to join'. I would say that anything Lê Đức Thọ is eligible for, there must be something wrong with it." Thọ, in turn, did decline the prize, stating that "such bourgeois sentimentalities" were not for him, and citing the fact that the Paris Peace Accords had not yet stopped the fighting in Vietnam, though he said he would consider accepting the prize if the Paris Accord "is respected, the arms are silenced and real peace is established in South Vietnam". The deadline for Thọ to accept of 1 October 1974 passed without Thọ accepting the prize.

=== Ceremony ===
The award ceremony was held on 10 December 1973, on the traditional anniversary of Alfred Nobel's death, to give the Nobel Peace Prize to Kissinger. Kissinger declined to attend, concerned that the event would be targeted by anti-war protestors. Aase Lionaes, the chairwoman of the 1973 Nobel Committee, gave the award ceremony speech, stating

In awarding the Prize in 1973 as well to two responsible politicians at the centre of events, the Nobel Committee of the Norwegian Storting emphasizes its belief that the approach to a solution of the many controversies that have led to or may lead to war must be via negotiations, not through total war aiming at total victory.

In the course of her speech, Aase also read from Kissinger's letter to the Nobel Committee accepting the award, in which he said

I am deeply moved by the award of the Nobel Peace Prize, which I regard as the highest honor one could hope to achieve in the pursuit of peace on this earth. When I consider the list of those who have been so honored before me, I can only accept this award with humility. The people of the United States, and indeed of the whole world, share the hope expressed by the Nobel Peace Prize Committee that all parties to this conflict will feel morally responsible for turning the ceasefire in Vietnam into a lasting peace for the suffering peoples of Indochina. Certainly my Government, for its part, intends to continue to conduct its policies in such a way as to turn this hope into reality.

Kissinger received half of the allotted prize pool for 1973, roughly $65,000 (equivalent to $471,000 in 2025), which he used to set up a scholarship fund in the name of his parents for the children of dead or missing American servicemen.

== Nominations ==
In total, the Norwegian Nobel Committee received 170 nominations for 45 nominees: 39 individuals and 8 organizations.

Official list of nominees and their nominators for the prize
No.	Nominee	Country/ Headquarters	Motivations	Nominator(s)
1	Napoleón Bilbao Rioja (1902–?)	Bolivia	"for having avoided the bacteriological war that the Bolivian high command had already decided to launch against the Republic of Paraguay, contaminating, to this effect, water courses with bacilli encouraged to cause deadly epidemics."	Antonio Jorge Pérez Amuchãstegui (1921–1983)
2	Charles K. Bliss (1897–1985)	Austria; Australia	"for establishing an educational non-profit trust for the furtherance of his work during and after his lifetime."	Doug Everingham (1923–2017)
3	Pearl S. Buck (1892–1973)	United States	"for her compassion and as a great humanist that is known worldwide because of her writings."	Robert Stafford (1913–2006)
3	Pearl S. Buck (1892–1973)	United States	"for her work in Korea and countries nearby where she is devoted to helping the racially mixed children economically, educationally and morally through her foundation 'The Pearl S. Buck Foundation'."	Lee Hai-rang (1916–1989)
3	Pearl S. Buck (1892–1973)	United States	"for her participation in humanitarian projects, through moral and financial support to thousands of mixed-blood children in Korea as a pilot endeavor with intent to aid in all Asian countries."	Kim Jong-pil (1926–2018)
3	Pearl S. Buck (1892–1973)	United States	"for her work with her foundation 'Pearl S. Buck Foundation' that was setting up opportunity centers for children in capitals in Southeast Asia."	Carlos P. Romulo (1899–1985)
3	Pearl S. Buck (1892–1973)	United States	"for her establishment of the Pearl S. Buck Foundation which, through opportunity centers seeks to gather all orphan Amerasians to house them, educate them and teach them skills."	Gil Puyat (1907–1981)
4	Hélder Câmara (1909–1999)	Brazil	"for his work pleading to different instances on behalf of the world's poor and for a non-violence struggle to liquidate the injustices and to bring peace to the world."	Sef Imkamp (1925–2013)
4	Hélder Câmara (1909–1999)	Brazil	"for his work in the North-eastern region of Brazil and work outside of that with social justice and non-violent movements."	American Friends Service Committee
4	Hélder Câmara (1909–1999)	Brazil	"for his striving after righteousness, justice and peace working not only in Brazil but at international level."	C. A. Koopman (?)
4	Hélder Câmara (1909–1999)	Brazil	"for all of his activities in favour of justice and peace."	Edward Brongersma (1911–1998)
4	Hélder Câmara (1909–1999)	Brazil	"for his striving after justice and peace, not only in Brazil, but also at an international level."	Lambertus Marie de Rijk (1924–2012)
4	Hélder Câmara (1909–1999)	Brazil	"for his noble fights for peace and justice."	Yoshiaki Iisaka (1926–2003)
4	Hélder Câmara (1909–1999)	Brazil	No motivation included.	William Hare, 5th Earl of Listowel (1906–1997)
4	Hélder Câmara (1909–1999)	Brazil	"among others for his authentic striving after righteousness, justice and peace working not only in Brazil but at international level."	Onorio Cengarle (1923–2007)
4	Hélder Câmara (1909–1999)	Brazil	"because of his work against the threat to world peace caused both by racial problems and the gap between rich and poor nations and people."	Henry Walston, Baron Walston (1912–1991)
4	Hélder Câmara (1909–1999)	Brazil	"for his striving after righteousness, justice and peace working not only in Brazil but at international level."	Several members of the Dutch Parliament
4	Hélder Câmara (1909–1999)	Brazil	"for the work he has done in Brazil and Latin America, as well as his many publications, discussions and lectures all over the world."	Several members of the German Parliament
4	Hélder Câmara (1909–1999)	Brazil	"for his pursuit for peace by his actions and commitment on a global level."	Several members of the Belgian Parliament
4	Hélder Câmara (1909–1999)	Brazil	No motivation included.	Renaat Van Elslande (1916–2000)
4	Hélder Câmara (1909–1999)	Brazil	"for his sacrifice for the good of humanity and for peace."	E. Rothen (?)
4	Hélder Câmara (1909–1999)	Brazil	"for his activities so that the underprivileged of his country and those of the Third World in general will enjoy more humane living conditions."	Léon Bollendorff (1915–2011)
4	Hélder Câmara (1909–1999)	Brazil	"for his righteousness, justice and peace working not only in Brazil but at an international level."	Giuseppe Spataro (1897–1979)
4	Hélder Câmara (1909–1999)	Brazil	No motivation included.	Eigil Liand (?); Olav Totland (1904–1996)
4	Hélder Câmara (1909–1999)	Brazil	"for his work to create a social and political change in Brazil, a change that is needed for peace to be created."	9 members of the Swedish Parliament
5	Umberto Campagnolo (1904–1976)	Italy	"for his role in European Society of Cultures (SEC) which brings together the bearers of all ideologies, all religions all philosophical thoughts and the adherents of all political systems."	Antony Babel (1888–1979)
5	Umberto Campagnolo (1904–1976)	Italy	"for his dedication to promoting peace and encouraging a free dialogue between cultures forming the will to achieve a peaceful future."	Giovanni Stiffoni (1934–1994)
6	Josué de Castro (1908–1973)	Brazil	"for his contribution in promoting understanding of problems of development and the third world and awareness of interrelationship of development population and environment."	David Wismark (?)
7	Jean Chazal (1907–1991)	France	"because of the nominator's wish to give the problem of mal-adjusted youth its greatest possible prominence."	Pablo Herrera Campíns (1917–2015)
8	Sri Chinmoy (1931–2007)	India; United States	"for his undeniable power he has to impart inner peace, that will lead to actively work for outer peace."	Francis Cephas Cady (1925–2014)
8	Sri Chinmoy (1931–2007)	India; United States	"for his contribution to the West offering immense spiritual wealth and the message that the world's inner and outer well-being are inseparably one."	William Barrett (1913–1992)
9	John Collins (1905–1982)	United Kingdom	No motivation included.	Garth Nettheim (1913–2018)
9	John Collins (1905–1982)	United Kingdom	"for his efforts to combat racialism and to bring peace and understanding between different races and ideologies."	Whetu Tirikatene-Sullivan (1932–2011)
9	John Collins (1905–1982)	United Kingdom	No motivation included.	Olle Westberg (1926–2013)
9	John Collins (1905–1982)	United Kingdom	"for his work for reconciliation between the belligerents after the end of the second World War, reconciliation between peoples of different races and ideologies, for the promotion of international harmony and for the banning of nuclear weapons."	6 members of the British Parliament
10	Andrew W. Cordier (1901–1975)	United States	"for his earnest compulsion for seeking peace among a global medley of nations occasionally intent upon conflict amongst other through his role in the United Nations."	Ralph Regula (1924–2017)
11	Daniel Ellsberg (1931–2023)	United States	No motivation included.	Johan Galtung (1930–2024)
12	Indira Gandhi (1917–1984)	India	"for her outstanding contribution to the promotion of world peace and international understanding."	Buddha Priya Maurya (1926–2004)
13	Robert S. Hartman (1910–1973)	West Germany; United States	"for his work on the The Structure of Value: Foundations of Formal Axiology."	Luigi Bagolini (1913–2005)
13	Robert S. Hartman (1910–1973)	West Germany; United States	"for his many publications on the question of value to prevent intellectual and ethical anarchy."	Fritz-Joachim von Rintelen (1898–1979)
13	Robert S. Hartman (1910–1973)	West Germany; United States	"for his seminal work The Structure of Value: Foundations of Formal Axiology, and for his life of outstanding contribution to peace among nations, among classes, and in man's heart."	John W. Davis (1873–1955)
13	Robert S. Hartman (1910–1973)	West Germany; United States	"for his philosophical works, articles and lectures on the theory of values, and his tireless efforts towards common understanding."	Daniel Christoff (1926–1996)
14	Marc Joux (?)	France	"for his continuous work to create a climate for thought and action, a public movement, in favour of enhancing human conditions and a grander peace."	Auguste Billiemaz (1903–1983)
15	Spurgeon Milton Keeny (1924–2012)	United States	"for his work in East Asia with family planning programs that can avoid human suffering and major economic and social dislocations."	Chester E. Jarvis (1910–1999)
16	Jomo Kenyatta (c. 1897–1978)	Kenya	"because under his leadership Kenya has made great strides in the social and economic fields in the short period of nine years of independence."	Njoroge Mungai (1926–2014)
17	Henry Kissinger (1923–2023)	United States	"being responsible for paving the way to a rapprochement between the United States and the Soviet Union, as well as ensuring a rationalisation and normalisation of Sino-American relations, and also prepared the way to a cease-fire and pacification of the war in Vietnam."	Leslie C. Green (1920–2011); F. C. Engelmann (?)
17	Henry Kissinger (1923–2023)	United States	"[with Tho] for their roles as negotiators in the conflict between North-Vietnam and The United States."	John Sanness (1913–1984)
18	Luis Kutner (1908–1993)	United States	"for his concept of 'world habeas corpus' to prevent arbitrary detainment of prisoners and recognize certain international rights of all men."	Morgan F. Murphy (1932–2016)
19	Paul-Émile Léger (1904–1991)	Canada	"for his work as a missionary in central Africa."	Several members of the Canadian Parliament
20	Isaac Lewin (1906–1995)	United States	"for his solution to world politics through the establishment of a 'High Commission for Peace' by the United Nations."	4 members of the Israeli Parliament
21	Seán MacBride (1904–1988)	Ireland	"for his indefatigable work that is the essence of skilled and effective step-by-step peacemaking, based on a deep concern for human dignity and justice."	Arthur Booth (?)
21	Seán MacBride (1904–1988)	Ireland	"for his contribution to international thinking and action for peace."	Arthur Booth (?)
21	Seán MacBride (1904–1988)	Ireland	"for being one of the most dedicated and influential figures in the contemporary peace movement."	Arthur Hewlett (1907–1997)
21	Seán MacBride (1904–1988)	Ireland	"because of his power to bring large parts of the traditional peace movement with its idealistic and pacifist basis into contact with bodies representing political power and responsibility."	Øivind Andersen (born 1944)
21	Seán MacBride (1904–1988)	Ireland	"for his effort to help individuals who have been wronged because of their personal convictions as well as to strengthen the institutions that represent a counterweight to the all-powerful organization of a state apparatus."	Rainer Köning (?)
22	Jules Moch (1893–1985)	France	"for his continuous fight for disarmament and attendance to conferences where he plays a leading part in the discussions of constructive plans for ending the arms race and demilitarizing the world."	Philip Noel-Baker (1889–1982)
23	Jean Monnet (1888–1979)	France	No motivation included.	Hélène Leynen (1907–1983)
23	Jean Monnet (1888–1979)	France	"for his contributions to peace by being the father of European collaboration."	Frits Portheine (1923–1990)
23	Jean Monnet (1888–1979)	France	"for his work for European unity which has led to the enlargement of the European Economic Community."	Bill Rodgers, Baron Rodgers of Quarry Bank (born 1928)
23	Jean Monnet (1888–1979)	France	"for being one of the founders of Europe and for establishing a European community."	Alain Poher (1909–1996)
23	Jean Monnet (1888–1979)	France	"for his efforts towards promoting the continued expansion of European cooperation to as many countries as possible."	Svante Bergström (1931–2014); Stig Strömholm (born 1931); Göran Ohlin (1925–1996)
24	Richard Nixon (1913–1994)	United States	"for several achievements towards peace, among other things his 'journey for peace' to Peking and his acceptance of responsibility for repulsing armed invasion of South Vietnam while providing a peaceful alternative on generous and compassionate terms."	Allen E. Smith (1921–?)
24	Richard Nixon (1913–1994)	United States	"for his accomplishments that makes it clear that he is the premier peacemaker of our time."	John D. Calamari (1921–1994)
24	Richard Nixon (1913–1994)	United States	"for his contribution to world peace including basic reform of monetary agreements which may very well lay the foundation for a new international economic order, and negotiating the Strategic Arms Limitations Treaty agreements between the world's two most powerful nations."	Arthur A. Weeks (1914–2009)
24	Richard Nixon (1913–1994)	United States	"for the record of initiatives and accomplishments he did in 1972 for a lasting world peace."	Kenji Fukunaga (1910–1998)
24	Richard Nixon (1913–1994)	United States	"for his leadership in repelling aggression and defending the internationally recognized right of self-determination in Indo-China."	Louis C. Wyman (1917–2002); Several members of the American Congress
24	Richard Nixon (1913–1994)	United States	"for his work and being a dedicated international servant of great stature that have added significant dimensions of experience to the social welfare and over-all development of underdeveloped nations."	Dominic J. Bing (?)
24	Richard Nixon (1913–1994)	United States	"for his initiatives and accomplishments in pursuit for an honourable meaningful and lasting era of world peace."	Émile F. Luke (1895–1980)
24	Richard Nixon (1913–1994)	United States	"for his initiatives and accomplishments in pursuit for an honourable meaningful and lasting era of world peace."	George B. Fraser (1914–1995)
24	Richard Nixon (1913–1994)	United States	"for being a world leader for world peace and his activities towards this."	George Kenneth Reiblich (1905–1992)
24	Richard Nixon (1913–1994)	United States	"for re-establishing normal trade relations and dialogue between the United States and the Soviet Union and between the United States and mainland China, amongst other activities towards world peace."	Hugh Yancey Bernard (1919–2007)
25	Marcelo Nubla (1898–1985)	Philippines	"for his identification of two evils, namely 'selfishness' and 'greed', and advocating for peace through elimination of these evils."	Jose Roy (1904–1986)
26	Samuel Pisar (1929–2015)	Poland; United States	"for his work, thoughts and actions that have contributed to birth of new structures allowing a lasting world peace."	Jean-Jacques Servan-Schreiber (1924–2006)
27	Jeannette Rankin (1880–1973)	United States	"for being the first woman to be elected to the United States congress, as a promoter of the cause of woman suffrage in the state of Washington and for opposing the Vietnam war."	Mike Mansfield (1903–2001)
28	Adam Schaff (1913–2006)	Poland	"for founding and running the European Coordination Centre which has gathered social scientists from communist and capitalist countries and for organizing peace conferences."	Dietrich Sperling (1933–2023)
29	Gerard C. Smith (1914–1994)	United States	"for how he, under the direction as United States Representative, was able to reach an agreement with Soviet Union and the U.S. on a Treaty on the Limitation of Anti-Ballistic Missile Systems and the Interim Agreement on Certain Measures with respect to the Limitation of Strategic Offensive Arms which were signed in Moscow on May 26, 1972."	Clement Zablocki (1912–1983)
30	Joseph Gabriel Starke (1911–2006)	Australia	"for his contribution to international law and for written the first text-book on science of peace called An Introduction to the Science of Peace (Irenology)."	Patrick Harding Lane (1923–2007)
31	Clarence Streit (1896–1986)	United States	No motivation included.	Lee Metcalf (1911–1978)
32	Fernando Tamayo Tamayo (1950–2018)	Colombia	"for his work with Profamilia and International Planned Parenthood Federation, transforming the climate of opinion in Colombia, previously opposed to family planning by tradition and religion."	Norman Borlaug (1914–2009)
33	Lê Đức Thọ (1911–1990)	North Vietnam	"for their roles as negotiators in the conflict between North-Vietnam and The United States."	John Sanness (1913–1984)
34	Tran Minh Tiet (1922–1986)	South Vietnam	"for his ideas and work to better Asia's position in the world."	Members of the South Vietnamese Government
35	Josip Broz Tito (1892–1980)	Yugoslavia	No motivation included.	Pierre Grégoire (1907–1991)
35	Josip Broz Tito (1892–1980)	Yugoslavia	"for his development and strengthening of the federal system in Yugoslavia."	Alfons Vranckx (1907–1979)
35	Josip Broz Tito (1892–1980)	Yugoslavia	"or his effort to world peace and peaceful relations between all people, whatever their social or political regime."	Paul Struye (1896–1974)
35	Josip Broz Tito (1892–1980)	Yugoslavia	"for being one of the first to activate 'active neutralism' and the 'peaceful and active coexistence of nations and not blocs'."	Guy Mollet (1905–1975)
35	Josip Broz Tito (1892–1980)	Yugoslavia	"for having pacified and consolidating his own country."	Grga Novak (1888–1978); Juraj Andrassy (1896–1977); Predrag Vranicki (1922–2002)
35	Josip Broz Tito (1892–1980)	Yugoslavia	"for his effort to always work for peace and cooperation between people, and because of that has made Yugoslavia a free, united and respected state."	Léopold Sédar Senghor (1906–2001)
35	Josip Broz Tito (1892–1980)	Yugoslavia	"for showing that even in an age of power-blocs and super-powers, it is possible for a small but well led and resolute nation to preserve its own independence and pursue its own individual policies."	Sir Fitzroy Maclean, 1st Baronet (1911–1996)
35	Josip Broz Tito (1892–1980)	Yugoslavia	"for being a fighter for equal and thorough co-operation among nations and countries in the world."	Kenneth Kaunda (1924–2021)
35	Josip Broz Tito (1892–1980)	Yugoslavia	"for being one of the greatest fighters for preserving peace, freedom, independence, peaceful and democratic international relationships."	Ali Hadri (1928–1987)
35	Josip Broz Tito (1892–1980)	Yugoslavia	"for advancing the cause of peace by his calm but firm and successful resistance to Russian designs over his country, as well as demonstrating how it's possible for different social systems to live together."	Jo Grimond (1913–1993)
35	Josip Broz Tito (1892–1980)	Yugoslavia	"for leading the way towards peaceful coexistence in his own country, but also in the Third World by bringing together the developed and developing countries in an atmosphere of mutual understanding."	Henry Walston, Baron Walston (1912–1991)
35	Josip Broz Tito (1892–1980)	Yugoslavia	"for his policy of non-alignment implemented by periodical meetings of nations on a worldwide scale."	Rubén Carpio Castillo (?)
35	Josip Broz Tito (1892–1980)	Yugoslavia	"for his contribution to world peace and his unwavering commitment to the principles of peaceful coexistence between people."	Kamel Asaad (1932–2010)
35	Josip Broz Tito (1892–1980)	Yugoslavia	"for his principles of active and peaceful coexistence, of the policy of non-alignment and of overcoming the gap between developed and underdeveloped countries."	Víctor Flores Olea (1932–2020)
35	Josip Broz Tito (1892–1980)	Yugoslavia	"for his achievements in bringing his country through the war and in maintaining its unity and independence."	Hartley Shawcross (1902–2003)
35	Josip Broz Tito (1892–1980)	Yugoslavia	"for working tirelessly to create a group of non-aligned nations among the hostile military blocs in order to bring about a new world order featuring disarmament, peaceful coexistence, self-determination of nations and the disappearance of military blocs."	Demetrio Boersner (1930–2016)
35	Josip Broz Tito (1892–1980)	Yugoslavia	"for his devotion to the service of peace and the happiness of humanity."	Hafez Badawi (1922–1983)
35	Josip Broz Tito (1892–1980)	Yugoslavia	"for his work as a statesman to the objective of peace and recognition for a small country which considers its struggle for peace as an organic part of the struggle for freedom and progress."	Mijalko Todorović (1913–1999)
35	Josip Broz Tito (1892–1980)	Yugoslavia	"for being one of the creators of the policy of non-alignment which represents the expression of the aspirations of most peoples and countries to overcome divisions and confrontations of the blocs."	Jovan Gligorijević (1918–1982)
35	Josip Broz Tito (1892–1980)	Yugoslavia	"for his personal contribution to the world peace by the courage and skill which he has maintained in the years since the end of the Second World War."	John Harding, 1st Baron Harding of Petherton (1896–1989)
35	Josip Broz Tito (1892–1980)	Yugoslavia	"for his tireless effort to establish freedom and independence for alle people, following the example of what he has achieved for his own country."	Pierre de Montesquiou (1909–1976)
35	Josip Broz Tito (1892–1980)	Yugoslavia	"for his fight for peace, mutual cooperation and collaboration on equal rights among the states and peoples of the world."	Diego Uribe Vargas (1931–2022)
35	Josip Broz Tito (1892–1980)	Yugoslavia	"for his work as a statesman that has largely contributed to promoting peace and harmony in the world."	Habib Bourguiba (1903–2000)
35	Josip Broz Tito (1892–1980)	Yugoslavia	"for his struggle and efforts to build peaceful, friendly and democratic relations in the world."	Alejandro Carrillo Castro (born 1941)
35	Josip Broz Tito (1892–1980)	Yugoslavia	"for his active role in promoting non-alignment, to help reduce a number of conflicts, particularly that in the Middle East, and to reduce the antagonism between the blocs and to develop mutual understanding between them."	Maurice Duverger (1917–2014)
35	Josip Broz Tito (1892–1980)	Yugoslavia	"for his efforts to peace and collaboration among the peoples and countries of the world."	Salvador Allende (1908–1973)
35	Josip Broz Tito (1892–1980)	Yugoslavia	"for his search for peace and human understanding in the world."	Kenneth Kaunda (1924–2021)
35	Josip Broz Tito (1892–1980)	Yugoslavia	"for his contribution to world peace and as one of the founders of the policy of non-alignment."	Sirimavo Bandaranaike (1916–2000)
35	Josip Broz Tito (1892–1980)	Yugoslavia	"for his work to establish a world of justice and peace by contributing to the rapprochement between peoples that history has not always allowed to know each other."	Moktar Ould Daddah (1924–2003)
35	Josip Broz Tito (1892–1980)	Yugoslavia	"for his tireless work to reduce tensions between alliance blocs and encouraged non-aligned countries in their efforts to find their own place and independence."	4 members of the German Parliament
35	Josip Broz Tito (1892–1980)	Yugoslavia	"for his achievements of the economic, cultural and political development of contemporary Yugoslavia as well as with the struggle for peace, independence, freedom and democratic relations."	Saburō Eda (1907–1977)
35	Josip Broz Tito (1892–1980)	Yugoslavia	"for contribution as a statesman for safeguarding peace in the present world and for development of democratic relations among the states and nations all over the world."	Tomomi Narita (1912–1979)
35	Josip Broz Tito (1892–1980)	Yugoslavia	"for his work for independence and unity of the peoples of Yugoslavia, especially during the Second World War."	Rafael Paasio (1903–1980)
35	Josip Broz Tito (1892–1980)	Yugoslavia	"for being a significant example for the new generations for having been able to choose at every moment for peace, the future of peoples and their progress."	Arrigo Boldrini (1915–2008)
35	Josip Broz Tito (1892–1980)	Yugoslavia	"for his work relating to the Conference of Non-Aligned Nations that has played an important part in the maintenance of world peace and the continued territorial integrity of the small nations which are members of it."	Julius Nyerere (1922–1999)
35	Josip Broz Tito (1892–1980)	Yugoslavia	"for his work as a statesman after the Second World War and his fight for international peace."	Erik Castrén (1904–1984)
35	Josip Broz Tito (1892–1980)	Yugoslavia	"for being a leading statesman in Europe to strengthening the state of peace and for succeeding in an admirable way in leading his own country, Yugoslavia, towards internal stability and welfare."	Bengt Broms (1929–2023)
35	Josip Broz Tito (1892–1980)	Yugoslavia	"for his tireless effort to break down the division of the world into Eastern and Western blocs."	Knud Børge Andersen (1914–1984); Poul Hartling (1914–2000)
35	Josip Broz Tito (1892–1980)	Yugoslavia	"for begin an outstanding statesman and a fighter for peace, equal and broad cooperation among peoples and states all over the world."	Funada Naka (1895–1979)
35	Josip Broz Tito (1892–1980)	Yugoslavia	"for his work for international understanding between states with different social systems and his activities have been of particular importance within the circle of non-aligned countries."	Ahti Karjalainen (1923–1990)
35	Josip Broz Tito (1892–1980)	Yugoslavia	"for his work towards peace and freedom, and for contributing to stabilizing the conditions in Southeast Europe through his leadership in Yugoslavia."	Otto Bastiansen (1918–1995); 5 members of the Norwegian Parliament; 3 members of the Finnish Parliament
35	Josip Broz Tito (1892–1980)	Yugoslavia	No motivation included.	3 members of the Swedish Parliament
35	Josip Broz Tito (1892–1980)	Yugoslavia	"for his activity in the development and deepening of international relations, intensification of cooperation between peoples and consolidation of peace in the world."	Vladislav Brajković (1905–1989)
35	Josip Broz Tito (1892–1980)	Yugoslavia	"for his contribution to world peace through the idea of non-alignment."	Aklilu Habte-Wold (1912–1974)
36	Cláudio Villas-Bôas (1916–1998)	Brazil	No motivation included.	Alan Lennox-Boyd, 1st Viscount Boyd of Merton (1904–1983)
37	Orlando Villas-Bôas (1914–2002)	Brazil	No motivation included.	Alan Lennox-Boyd, 1st Viscount Boyd of Merton (1904–1983)
38	Kurt Waldheim (1918–2007)	Austria	"for his bravery to serve world peace since he assumed as Secretary-General of the United Nations, considering his prime duty to set forth initiatives and to set foot all necessary to work for peace in the Middle East as well as in Indochina."	Trần Ngọc Tám (1926–2011)
39	Elie Wiesel (1928–2016)	Romania; United States	"for that through his writings and his skill as a teacher he has moved men to remember the realities of war and has awakened their desire to overcome war."	Henry M. Jackson (1912–1983)
39	Elie Wiesel (1928–2016)	Romania; United States	No motivation included.	Ingemund Gullvåg (1925–1998)
39	Elie Wiesel (1928–2016)	Romania; United States	"for his efforts to promote peace and for symbolizing hope and inspiration for all people."	Hubert Humphrey (1911–1978)
Organizations
40	Amnesty International (founded in 1961)	London	"for their work with Article 5 of the United Nations Universal Declaration of Human Rights and their activities for the political prisoners in Indochina."	Members of the Swedish Parliament
41	The Hague Academy of International Law (founded in 1923)	The Hague	No motivation included.	Paul Guggenheim (1899–1977)
41	The Hague Academy of International Law (founded in 1923)	The Hague	"for being the institution known most widely throughout the world as the for the study and the teaching of international law."	Philip Jessup (1897–1986)
41	The Hague Academy of International Law (founded in 1923)	The Hague	"in relation to their half-century jubilee to underline the importance of international law in the world."	Lester B. Pearson (1897–1972)
41	The Hague Academy of International Law (founded in 1923)	The Hague	"for its contribution to increase international understanding, and to create personal connections that help to bridge national borders and political contradictions, and also the gap between the new and old states."	Edvard Hambro (1911–1977)
41	The Hague Academy of International Law (founded in 1923)	The Hague	"for its work to broaden and strengthen international law, to create a community of international lawyers who have known and worked with each other and to develop an understanding of international law among the older and the new nations."	Dean Rusk (1909–1994)
41	The Hague Academy of International Law (founded in 1923)	The Hague	"for its mission in dissemination of international law, and for always exercising this in the service of peace and international understanding with openness to all countries."	Jean Foyer (1921–2008)
41	The Hague Academy of International Law (founded in 1923)	The Hague	"for their effort to lay the foundations of a peaceful international society based on law."	Alfred von Overbeck (1877–1945)
41	The Hague Academy of International Law (founded in 1923)	The Hague	"for their ability to gather theoreticians and practitioners of law and discuss peace through law."	Haroldo Valladão (1901–1987)
41	The Hague Academy of International Law (founded in 1923)	The Hague	"for being a facilitator for many instances, but specially lawyers and diplomats from the Third World."	Boutros Boutros-Ghali (1922–2016)
41	The Hague Academy of International Law (founded in 1923)	The Hague	"for its work to the 'promotion of fraternity between nations', and for international peace based on law, order and humanistic ideals."	Sobhi Mahmassani (1909–1986)
41	The Hague Academy of International Law (founded in 1923)	The Hague	"for its work to gather people all over the world to teach, talk and discuss about international law."	Frank Pakenham, 7th Earl of Longford (1905–2001)
41	The Hague Academy of International Law (founded in 1923)	The Hague	"for their effort to bringing together jurists from all nations and developing an international law capable of avoiding tensions between states."	Seydou Madani Sy (born 1933)
41	The Hague Academy of International Law (founded in 1923)	The Hague	"for the effort undertaken by the Academy to disseminate knowledge in the Third World countries."	Henri Rolin (1891–1973)
41	The Hague Academy of International Law (founded in 1923)	The Hague	"for their lectures, activities, exchanges and relationships taking place within and around the Academy, bringing together young and older scholars in international law."	Georges Abi-Saab (born 1933)
41	The Hague Academy of International Law (founded in 1923)	The Hague	"for their different activities that has contributed to spread the principles of International law as widely as possible in the service of world peace."	Jorge Castañeda y Álvarez de la Rosa (1921–1997)
41	The Hague Academy of International Law (founded in 1923)	The Hague	"for their effort to gather people from different countries and different systems of law and legislations, and the value of the contact between them."	Arnold McNair, 1st Baron McNair (1885–1975)
41	The Hague Academy of International Law (founded in 1923)	The Hague	"for the reason that since its foundation in 1923, The Hague Academy has been instrumental in furthering the role of international law in international relations."	Bert Röling (1906–1985)
41	The Hague Academy of International Law (founded in 1923)	The Hague	"for its important role in promoting the development, dissemination and wider practice of International Law in the international community."	Tommy Koh (1937)
41	The Hague Academy of International Law (founded in 1923)	The Hague	"for the importance of spreading the knowledge of international law, promoting public interest in this subject and familiarizing the peoples with the principles and rules that govern international relations."	Endre Ustor (1909–1998)
41	The Hague Academy of International Law (founded in 1923)	The Hague	"for the international training of the young generation and the orientation of these people towards peace."	René Cassin (1887–1976)
41	The Hague Academy of International Law (founded in 1923)	The Hague	"for establishing human contact under the auspices of International law."	Ignaz Seidl-Hohenveldern (1918–2001)
41	The Hague Academy of International Law (founded in 1923)	The Hague	"for valuable contribution to the cause of peace and international understanding."	César Sepúlveda Gutiérrez (1916–1994)
41	The Hague Academy of International Law (founded in 1923)	The Hague	"for their contribution to the development of international law and the dissemination of the idea of international peace."	Nachum Feinberg (born 1944)
41	The Hague Academy of International Law (founded in 1923)	The Hague	"for their dynamic reassessment of its possible contributions to peace and law and their opportunities for training of larger numbers of able students from the emerging new States of Africa and Asia."	Herbert W. Briggs (1900–1990)
41	The Hague Academy of International Law (founded in 1923)	The Hague	"for their work on the dissemination of the law of peace but also gathering professors and young jurists coming from all regions of the world."	Gaetano Morelli (1990–1989)
41	The Hague Academy of International Law (founded in 1923)	The Hague	"for their contribution to enhancing the role of international law in international relations, to the development of understanding among States and Peoples and to the maintenance of international peace and security."	Lazar Lunz (?)
41	The Hague Academy of International Law (founded in 1923)	The Hague	"for gathering students from around the globe and fostered the free exchange of ideas on matters crucial for the future of the world peace."	Willem Riphagen (1919–1994)
41	The Hague Academy of International Law (founded in 1923)	The Hague	"for promoting the international exchange of ideas and views in regards to rules of international law without any form of discrimination."	Norbert Schmelzer (1921–2008)
41	The Hague Academy of International Law (founded in 1923)	The Hague	"for preparing thousands of people around the world to work for the cause of peace through law."	Jacques-Yvan Morin (1931–2023)
41	The Hague Academy of International Law (founded in 1923)	The Hague	"for being the only institution of its kind that is truly international in character, and that it has played an important role in encouraging scholars and researchers in developing countries."	Ronald St. John Macdonald (1928–2006)
41	The Hague Academy of International Law (founded in 1923)	The Hague	"for its work in the cultivation and dissemination of knowledge concerning the law of nations."	Julius Stone (1907–1985)
41	The Hague Academy of International Law (founded in 1923)	The Hague	"for their work on international law and the cause of peace."	Stephan Verosta (1909–1998)
42	International League of Associations for the Mentally Handicapped (founded in 1969)	Brussels	"for their influence around the world and that their aims and activities are pursued without any political, racial, religious or philosophical consideration."	Jean Kickx (?); Marc-Antoine Pierson (1908–1988)
42	International League of Associations for the Mentally Handicapped (founded in 1969)	Brussels	"for their work to recognize the human value of the mentally handicapped."	G. Schrans (?)
43	International Union for Land Value Taxation and Free Trade (founded in 1926)	London	No motivation included.	Alfred Henningsen (1918–2012)
44	International Union for Child Welfare (founded in 1946)	Brussels	No motivation included.	Marie Lous Mohr (1892–1973)
45	Population Council (founded in 1952)	New York City	"for its work to improve, develop and simplify international communications and to perfect postal services."	Roger Bonvin (1907–2002)
45	Population Council (founded in 1952)	New York City	"for its work to develop the connection between people through the efficient performance of the postal service and the contribution to the achievement of international cooperation in the cultural, social and economic area."	6 members of the Norwegian Parliament
46	Universal Esperanto Association (founded in 1908)	Rotterdam	"for its fight for equal rights of the languages and cultures of small and large nations to achieve the mutual understanding of all people and to secure peace all over the world."	Miloslav Kaňák (1917–1985); Rudolf Horský (1914–2001); Jan Blahoslav Čapek (1903–982)
47	World Health Organization (founded in 1948)	Geneva	"for their leading role among international organizations in favor of world peace, giving solid content to this fragile framework."	Christian Dominice (1931–2021)

== Prize committee ==
The following members of the Norwegian Nobel Committee were appointed by the Norwegian Parliament for 1973.

*	Resigned in protest

1971 Norwegian Nobel Committee
Picture	Name	Position	Political Party	Other posts
	Aase Lionæs (1907–1999)	Chairwoman	Labour	Vice President of the Lagting (1965–1973)
	Bernt Ingvaldsen (1902–1982)	Deputy Chairman	Conservative	Vice president of the Storting (1972–1973)
	Einar Hovdhaugen* (1908–1996)	Member	Centre	Former Centre Party Parliament representative
	Helge Rognlien* (1920–2001)	Member	Liberal	Liberal party chairman (1972–1974)
	John Sanness (1913–1984)	Member	Labour	Director of the Norwegian Institute of International Affairs (1960–1983)

== Legacy ==
As hostilities in Vietnam resumed in full, the 1975 spring offensive and subsequent fall of Saigon marked the complete failure of the Paris Peace Accords, and South Vietnam surrendered on 30 April 1975. On 1 May, the day after Saigon fell, Kissinger tried to give back the prize, stating via a cable to the Nobel Committee that "I regret, more profoundly than I can ever express, the necessity for this letter... the peace we sought through negotiations has been overturned by force." The Nobel committee declined his offer to return the award. As of February 2024, Lê Đức Thọ is the only person to have ever declined the Nobel Peace Prize, and one of only two people to ever decline any Nobel Prize. (Note: The other being Jean-Paul Sartre, who declined the 1964 Nobel Prize in Literature. This does not include people who were forbidden from accepting the Nobel Prize, such as Richard Kuhn (1938 Nobel Prize in Chemistry), Adolf Butenandt (1939 Nobel Prize in Chemistry) and Gerhard Domagk (1939 Nobel Prize in Physiology or Medicine) who were prevented from accepting their awards by Nazi Germany, or Boris Pasternak who declined the 1958 Nobel Prize in Literature under pressure from the Soviet Union.)

The award has endured as a critique of the Nobel Prize and its chosen winners, and is often remembered as one of the most controversial Nobel prizes ever given. With regard to why he stopped writing politically satirical music, comedian and musician Tom Lehrer famously quipped, "Political satire became obsolete when Henry Kissinger was awarded the Nobel Peace Prize." After the war, it was revealed in the Chennault Affair that Kissinger may have intentionally sabotaged peace talks in Vietnam in 1968 in order to help Richard Nixon become president, casting further derision on the choice to award him a Peace Prize for his work in Vietnam.

On 11 January 2023, documents from the 1973 nomination process were unsealed, showing that even the members of the committee who voted for Kissinger and Thọ believed that they could prove to be poor choices; further, they were skeptical that the Paris Accords would bring lasting peace. Stein Tønnesson, a Norwegian historian who reviewed the documents, said of them "I am even more surprised than I was at the time that the committee could come to such a bad decision." The records also revealed that John Sanness, a member of the committee, personally nominated Kissinger, and that the committee jointly awarded the prize to Thọ despite knowing relatively little about him as they felt they "could not give it to Kissinger alone." Following the unsealing of the documents and Kissinger's subsequent death in 2023, renewed attention was given to Kissinger's Peace Prize. One editorial published by Al-Jazeera labeled him "a war criminal with a Nobel Prize," calling the 1973 award "abhorrent" and "a slap in the face for the victims of Kissinger's brutality," while Norwegian Nobel historian Asle Sveen told the Agence France-Presse that it was "the worst prize in the entire history of the Nobel Peace Prize." However, some defended Kissinger's award. In an op-ed in the National Review, Jay Nordlinger argued that North Vietnam, not Kissinger, was responsible for the collapse of the Paris Peace Accords, and that an undue amount of backlash was directed at Kissinger as opposed to Thọ.

== Works cited ==
- Abrams, Irwin (2001). The Nobel Peace Prize and the Laureates: An Illustrated Biographical History. Science History Publications/USA. ISBN 0-88135-388-4.
- Feldman, Burton (2000). The Nobel Prize: A History of Genius, Controversy, and Prestige. Arcade Publishing. ISBN 1-55970-537-X.
- Horne, Alistair (2009). Kissinger's year: 1973. Weidenfeld & Nicolson. ISBN 9780297850915.
