= List of Vietnamese Nobel laureates and nominees =

Vietnamese Nobel laureates and nominees

The Nobel Prize medal received by the laureates

The Nobel Prizes and the Nobel Memorial Prize in Economic Sciences, which began in 1969, is a set of award based on Alfred Nobel's will given to "those who, during the preceding year, have conferred the greatest benefit to mankind." Since 1901, the prestigious Swedish Prize have been awarded 609 times to 975 people and 27 organizations including a Vietnamese diplomat.

The first and only Vietnamese Nobel laureate was Lê Đức Thọ when he was awarded the 1973 Nobel Peace Prize jointly with Henry Kissinger. But, Tho rejected the awarded claiming "peace has not yet really been established in South Vietnam."

== Laureates ==
=== Recognized laureates ===
Year	Image	Laureate	Born	Died	Field	Citation	Nominator(s)
Citizens
1973		Lê Đức Thọ (Note: Lê Đức Thọ declined the 1973 Nobel Peace Prize, claiming that peace had not yet been established, and that the United States and the South Vietnamese governments were in violation of the Paris Peace Accords. He became the first Asian laureate and first to decline the Peace Prize.)	14 October 1911; Nam Trực, Nam Định, French Indochina	13 October 1990; Hanoi, Vietnam	Peace	"for jointly having negotiated a cease fire in Vietnam in 1973." (awarded together with American diplomat Henry Kissinger)	

=== Members of laureate organizations ===
The following Vietnam-based organizations are members of a larger organization that are Nobel laureates.

Year	Image	Individual/ organization	Born	Laureate organization	Citation	Nominator(s)
Peace
1963		Vietnam Red Cross Society	founded on 23 November 1946 in Ứng Hòa, Hanoi, North Vietnam (now Hanoi, Vietnam)	League of Red Cross Societies (with International Committee of the Red Cross (ICRC))	"for promoting the principles of the Geneva Convention and cooperation with the U.N."	Max Huber (1874–1960); Nils Langhelle (1907–1967); Berte Rognerud et al. (Note: The other nominators of the Red Cross Societies include: 36 members of the Norwegian Parliament, 4 professors at the University of Oslo, 92 members of the Swedish Parliament, members of the Danish Parliament, the International Committee of the Red Cross, Einar Gerhardsen (1897–1987), Sjur Lindebrække (1909–1998), Sverre Steen (1898–1983), Johannes Andenæs (1912–2003), Rickard Sandler (1884–1964), and Sir Anthony Eden (1897–1977).) (1907–1997)

== Nominations ==
=== Nominees ===
Since 1967, Vietnamese citizens started receiving nominations for the prestigious Swedish Prize in any category. The following list are the nominees with verified nominations from the Nobel Committee and recognized international organizations. There are also other purported nominees whose nominations are yet to be verified since the archives are revealed 50 years after, among them:

- For Physics: Đàm Thanh Sơn, Minh Quang Tran and Trần Thanh Vân.
- For Literature: Nguyễn Chí Thiện, Nguyễn Quang Hồng, Xuân Diệu, Bảo Ninh and Kim Thúy.
- For Peace: Cardinal Nguyễn Văn Thuận, 2013 convicted Vietnamese dissidents, Amanda Nguyen, Nguyễn Đan Quế, Lê Công Định and Phạm Đoan Trang.

Image	Nominee	Born	Died	Years Nominated	Citation	Nominator(s)
Physiology or Medicine
	Alexandre Yersin (Note: Alexandre Yersin, a Swiss-French physician and bacteriologist, has been living since 1890 in French Indochina and took up residence in Nha Trang, Vietnam.)	22 September 1863 in Aubonne, Vaud, Switzerland	1 March 1943 in Nha Trang, Khánh Hòa, French Indochina	1904	"for his discovery of the plague bacillus."	Jaques-Louis Reverdin (1842–1929); Switzerland
Literature
	Hồ Hữu Tường	c. 1910 in Thường Thạnh, Cái Răng, Cần Thơ, French Indochina	26 June 1980 in Ho Chi Minh City, Vietnam	1969		Đông Hồ (1906–1969); South Vietnam
	Vũ Hoàng Chương	5 May 1915 in Phù Ủng, Ân Thi, Hưng Yên, French Indochina	6 September 1976 in Ho Chi Minh City, Vietnam	1972		Thanh Lãng (1924–1978); South Vietnam
Peace
	Thích Nhất Hạnh	11 October 1926; Huế, Thừa Thiên Huế, French Indochina	22 January 2022; Huế, Vietnam	1967	"for his lifelong efforts to promote peace, social justice and reconciliation in between North and South Vietnam."	George McTurnan Kahin (1918–2000); United States
	Thích Nhất Hạnh	11 October 1926; Huế, Thừa Thiên Huế, French Indochina	22 January 2022; Huế, Vietnam	1967	"for his lifelong efforts to promote peace, social justice and reconciliation in between North and South Vietnam."	Martin Luther King Jr. (1929–1968); United States
	Thích Nhất Hạnh	11 October 1926; Huế, Thừa Thiên Huế, French Indochina	22 January 2022; Huế, Vietnam	1967	"for his lifelong efforts to promote peace, social justice and reconciliation in between North and South Vietnam."	Walter Nash (1882–1968); New Zealand
	Thích Nhất Hạnh	11 October 1926; Huế, Thừa Thiên Huế, French Indochina	22 January 2022; Huế, Vietnam	1967	"for his lifelong efforts to promote peace, social justice and reconciliation in between North and South Vietnam."	Jim Cairns (1914–2003); Australia
	Thích Nhất Hạnh	11 October 1926; Huế, Thừa Thiên Huế, French Indochina	22 January 2022; Huế, Vietnam	1967	"for his lifelong efforts to promote peace, social justice and reconciliation in between North and South Vietnam."	John G. Dow (1905–2003); United States
	Thích Nhất Hạnh	11 October 1926; Huế, Thừa Thiên Huế, French Indochina	22 January 2022; Huế, Vietnam	1967	"for his lifelong efforts to promote peace, social justice and reconciliation in between North and South Vietnam."	Lawrence Fuchs (1927–2013); United States
	Thích Nhất Hạnh	11 October 1926; Huế, Thừa Thiên Huế, French Indochina	22 January 2022; Huế, Vietnam	1967	"for his lifelong efforts to promote peace, social justice and reconciliation in between North and South Vietnam."	Horace L. Friess (1900–1975); United States
	Lê Đức Thọ	14 October 1911 in Nam Trực, Nam Định, French Indochina	13 October 1990 in Hanoi, Vietnam	1972		John Sanness (1913–1984); Norway
	Trần Minh Tiết	28 December 1922 in Cam Lộ, Quảng Trị, French Indochina	18 April 1986 in Monterey Park, California, United States	1972		Vietnamese professors and members of the South Vietnamese government
	Thích Quảng Độ	27 November 1928 in Thành Châu, Thái Bình, French Indochina	22 February 2020 in Ho Chi Minh City, Vietnam	1978	"[with Quang] for their non-violent struggle for human rights and opposition against the Communist regime in Vietnam."	Betty Williams (1943–2020) Ireland; Mairead Maguire (b. 1944) Ireland
	Thích Quảng Độ	27 November 1928 in Thành Châu, Thái Bình, French Indochina	22 February 2020 in Ho Chi Minh City, Vietnam	2013	"[with Lý] for their selfless devotion in the pursuit of peaceful political reform and respect for fundamental freedoms in Vietnam."	Chris Smith (b. 1953) United States; Zoe Lofgren (b. 1947) United States
	Thích Huyền Quang	19 September 1919; An Nhơn, Bình Định, French Indochina	5 July 2008; Ho Chi Minh City, Vietnam	1978	"[with Độ] for their non-violent struggle for human rights and opposition against the Communist regime in Vietnam."	Betty Williams (1943–2020) Ireland; Mairead Maguire (b. 1944) Ireland
	Thích Huyền Quang	19 September 1919; An Nhơn, Bình Định, French Indochina	5 July 2008; Ho Chi Minh City, Vietnam	2008	"for his non-violent combat for freedom and justice amidst intimidation and imprisonment for three decades, inspiring Vietnamese of all generations and helping them to overcome fear."	60 members of the European Parliament
	Thích Huyền Quang	19 September 1919; An Nhơn, Bình Định, French Indochina	5 July 2008; Ho Chi Minh City, Vietnam	2008	"for his non-violent combat for freedom and justice amidst intimidation and imprisonment for three decades, inspiring Vietnamese of all generations and helping them to overcome fear."	67 members of the Italian Parliament
	Thích Huyền Quang	19 September 1919; An Nhơn, Bình Định, French Indochina	5 July 2008; Ho Chi Minh City, Vietnam	2008	"for his non-violent combat for freedom and justice amidst intimidation and imprisonment for three decades, inspiring Vietnamese of all generations and helping them to overcome fear."	members of the United States Congress
	12 Vietnamese women (part of the 1000 PeaceWomen) (Note: The 12 Vietnamese women who formed part in the 1000 PeaceWomen were Bùi Tiến Dũng (b. 1959), Đào Thị Bích Vân (?), Dương Thu Hương (b. 1947), Hà Thị Khiết (b. 1950), Lê Thị Quý (b. 1950), Nguyễn Thanh Hiện (b. 1940), Nguyễn Thị Bình (b. 1929), Nguyễn Thị Hoài Thu (b. 1943), Nguyễn Thị Hòe (b. 1946), Nguyễn Thị Ngọc Phượng (b. 1944), Trần Thị Lành (?) and Trần Bạch Thu Hà (b. 1949).)	began in 2003 in Bern, Switzerland		2005	"in recognition of women's efforts and visibility in promoting peace all over the world."	Ruth-Gaby Vermont-Mangold (b. 1941); Switzerland
	Thadeus Nguyễn Văn Lý	15 May 1946; Vĩnh Chấp, Vĩnh Linh, Quảng Trị, State of Vietnam	—N/a	2013	"[with Độ] for their selfless devotion in the pursuit of peaceful political reform and respect for fundamental freedoms in Vietnam."	Chris Smith (b. 1953) United States; Zoe Lofgren (b. 1947) United States
