= 1964 Nobel Prize in Literature =

- Jean-Paul Sartre
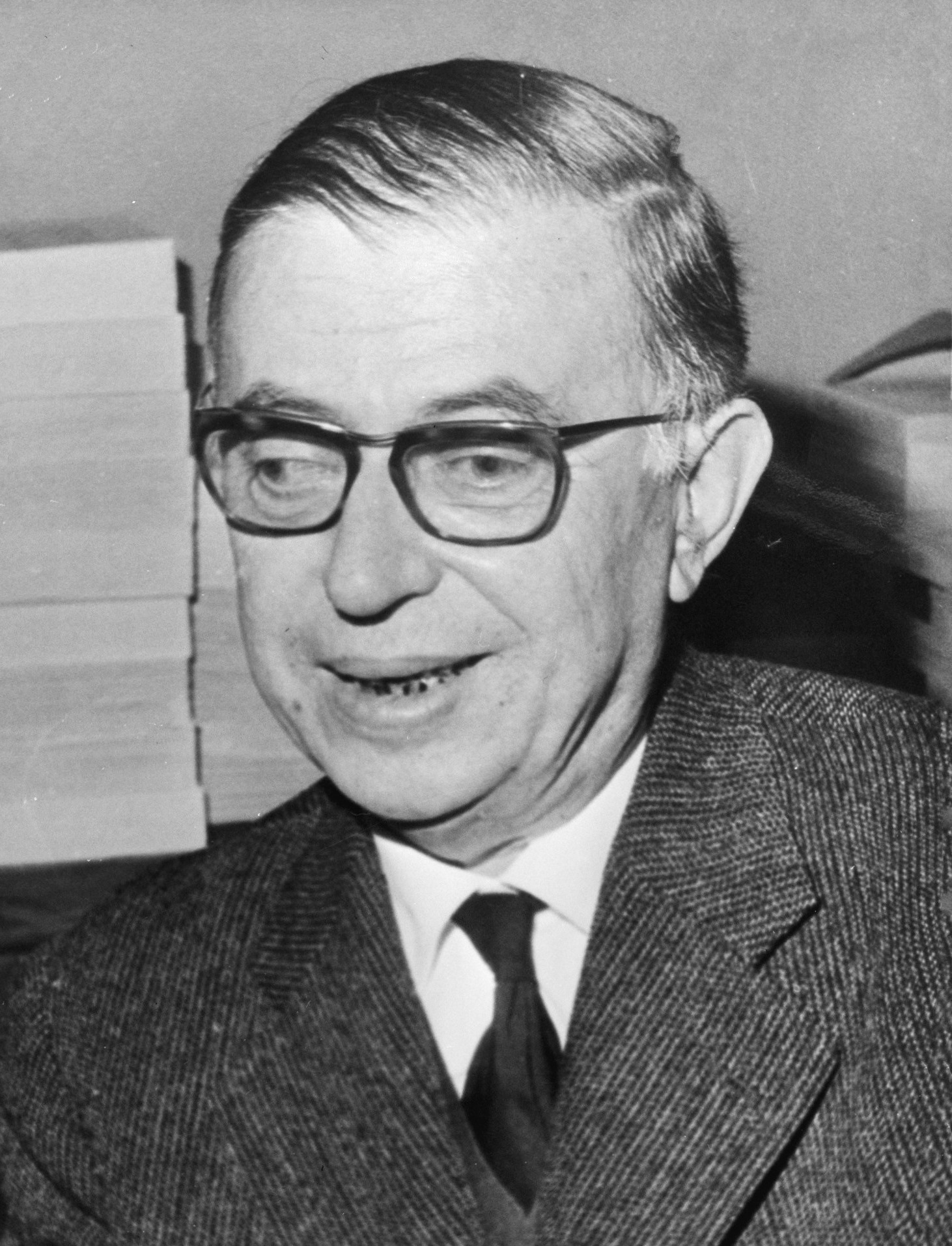
- "for his work, which rich in ideas and filled with the spirit of freedom and the quest for truth, has exerted a far-reaching influence on our age."
- Date: 22 October 1964 (announcement); 10 December 1964 (ceremony)
- Location: Stockholm, Sweden
- Presented by: Swedish Academy
- First award: 1901
- Website: Official website

The 1964 Nobel Prize in Literature was awarded to the French writer Jean-Paul Sartre (1905–1980) "for his work which, rich in ideas and filled with the spirit of freedom and the quest for truth, has exerted a far-reaching influence on our age".

Sartre declined the prize, saying that he never accepted any official honours and that he did not want the writer to become an institution. Furthermore, regarding the political grounds for his action, Sartre declared about the Nobel prize that it is one that goes only to Westerners "or to rebels of the East". "It is regrettable that the only Soviet work honored was one that was published abroad and forbidden in its own country." The Swedish Academy said in announcement:

It will be recalled that the laureate has made it known that he did not wish to accept the prize. The fact that he has declined this distinction does not in the least modify the validity of the award. Under the circumstances, however, the Academy can only state that the presentation of the prize cannot take place.

It is the only known occasion where a Laureate has voluntarily declined to accept the Nobel Prize in Literature after the Swedish Academy's permanent secretary Erik Axel Karlfeldt declined to accept the cancelled prize in 1919, and the first of only two occasions where any Nobel Prize has been voluntarily declined. (Note: The other being Lê Đức Thọ, who declined the 1973 Nobel Peace Prize. This does not include people who were forbidden from accepting the Nobel Prize, such as Richard Kuhn (1938 Nobel Prize in Chemistry), Adolf Butenandt (1939 Nobel Prize in Chemistry) and Gerhard Domagk (1939 Nobel Prize in Physiology or Medicine) who were prevented from accepting their awards by the Nazi Germany, or Boris Pasternak who declined the 1958 Nobel Prize in Literature under pressure from the Soviet Union.)

== Laureate ==
Sartre was a philosopher – formulated and popularized the philosophy existentialism largely formed in his Being and Nothingness ("L'Être et le néant", 1943) – and playwright but also wrote novels and short stories. Through the protagonist Antoine Roquentin, his first novel La Nausée ("Nausea", 1938) articulates the existentialist themes of alienation, devotion and loneliness.

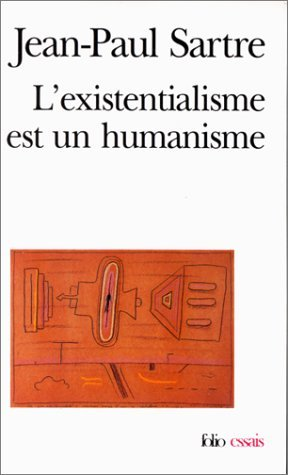
Sartre's essay published in October 1945.

His play Huis Clos ("No Exit", 1944) depicts hell as a perpetual co-existence with other people, while Les Mouches ("The Flies", 1943) is an adaptation of the ancient Electra myth. His autobiography Les Mots ("The Words", 1964), in which the author tries to distance himself from his writing and reconstruct his childhood, was received with great acclaim when it came out.

== Deliberations ==
=== Nominations ===
Sartre had received 16 nominations since 1957. In 1964, the Swedish Academy received two nominations for him with which he was eventually awarded. He was nominated by the Swedish PEN-Club and a professor of German language from the University of Strasbourg. Sartre was included in the shortlisted nominees together with Russian novelist Mikhail Sholokhov (awarded in 1965) and British writer W. H. Auden.

There were 76 authors nominated in 1964. Nineteen of them were nominated first-time, among them Eugène Ionesco, Paul Celan, José María Pemán, Hossein Ghods-Nakhai, James T. Farrell, Camilo José Cela (awarded in 1989), Harry Martinson (awarded in 1974), Hugh MacDiarmid, and Miguel Ángel Asturias (awarded in 1967). The highest number of nominations – 3 nominations each – were for Väinö Linna, Friedrich Dürrenmatt, André Malraux, and Mikhail Sholokhov (awarded in 1965). Four of the nominees were women: Judith Wright, Ina Seidel, Nelly Sachs (awarded in 1966), and Katherine Anne Porter.

The authors Halide Edib Adıvar, Abbas Mahmoud al-Aqqad, Brendan Behan, Angel Cruchaga Santa María, J. Frank Dobie, Wenceslao Fernández Flórez, Ian Fleming, Réginald Garrigou-Lagrange, Vassily Grossman, Ben Hecht, Thakin Kodaw Hmaing, Samuil Marshak, Moa Martinson, Flannery O'Connor, Karl Polanyi, Davíð Stefánsson, Păstorel Teodoreanu, Ion Vinea, Felix Weltsch, T. H. White, María Wiesse Romero, Helen Wodehouse, and Madeleva Wolff all died in 1964 without having been nominated for the prize.

Official list of nominees and their nominators for the prize
No.	Nominee	Country	Genre(s)	Nominator(s)
1	Jean Anouilh (1910–1987)	France	drama, screenplay, translation	Ragnar Josephson (1891–1966)
2	Miguel Ángel Asturias (1899–1974)	Guatemala	novel, short story, poetry, essays, drama	Erik Lindegren (1910–1968)
3	Wystan Hugh Auden (1907–1973)	United Kingdom; United States	poetry, essays, screenplay	William Empson (1906–1984); Simeon Potter (1898–1976)
4	Samuel Beckett (1906–1989)	Ireland	novel, drama, poetry	Bengt Holmqvist (1924–2002); William Stuart Maguinness (1903–1983)
5	Jorge Luis Borges (1899–1986)	Argentina	poetry, essays, translation, short story	Henry Olsson (1896–1985)
6	André Breton (1896–1966)	France	history, poetry, essays, literary criticism	Gabriel Germain (1903–1978); Jean Rousset (1910–2002)
7	Martin Buber (1878–1965)	Austria; Israel	philosophy	André Neher (1914–1988)
8	Michel Butor (1926–2016)	France	poetry, novel, essays, translation	Félix Carrère (1911–1991)
9	Heinrich Böll (1917–1985)	West Germany	novel, short story	Gustav Korlén (1915–2014)
10	Josep Carner (1884–1970)	Spain; Catalonia	poetry, drama, translation	Marie-Jeanne Durry (1901–1980); Marcel Ruff (1896–1993)
11	Jérôme Carcopino (1881–1970)	France	history	Pierre Grimal (1912–1996)
12	Camilo José Cela (1916–2002)	Spain	novel, short story, essay, poetry, drama, memoir	Daniel Poyán Díaz (1923–2007)
13	Paul Celan (1920–1970)	Romania; France	poetry, translation	Wilhelm Emrich (1909–1998); Hermann Bausinger (1926–2021)
14	Heimito von Doderer (1896–1966)	Austria	novel, short story, poetry, essays	Ernst Alker (1895–1972)
15	Lawrence Durrell (1912–1990)	United Kingdom	novel, short story, poetry, drama, essays	Georg Luck (1926–2013)
16	Friedrich Dürrenmatt (1921–1990)	Switzerland	drama, novel, short story, essays	Friedrich Sengle (1909–1994); Wolfgang Schmid (1913–1980); Walter Spoerri (1927–2016)
17	Gunnar Ekelöf (1907–1968)	Sweden	poetry, essays	Gunnar Tideström (1906–1985)
18	Pierre Emmanuel (1916–1984)	France	poetry	Jacques Robichez (1914–1999)
19	James Thomas Farrell (1904–1979)	United States	novel, short story, poetry	Edgar Marquess Branch (1913–2006)
20	Edward Morgan Forster (1879–1970)	United Kingdom	novel, short story, drama, essays, biography, literary criticism	Pierre Legouis (1891–1980)
21	Max Frisch (1911–1991)	Switzerland	novel, drama	Hennig Brinkmann (1901–2000)
22	Christopher Fry (1907–2005)	United Kingdom	poetry, drama, screenplay	Carl Becker (1925–1973)
23	Rómulo Gallegos (1884–1969)	Venezuela	novel, short story	John Callan James Metford (1916–2007)
24	Hossein Ghods-Nakhai (1911–1977)	Iran	poetry, essays	Ahmad Matin-Daftari (1897–1971)
25	Étienne Gilson (1884–1978)	France	philosophy	Pierre Mesnard (1900–1969)
26	Jean Giono (1895–1970)	France	novel, short story, essays, poetry, drama	Raymond Lebègue (1895–1984); Louis Moulinier (1904–1971)
27	Robert Graves (1895–1985)	United Kingdom	history, novel, poetry, literary criticism, essays	Sigfrid Siwertz (1882–1970)
28	Jean Guéhenno (1890–1978)	France	essays, literary criticism	Edmond Jarno (1905–1985)
29	Taha Hussein (1889–1973)	Egypt	novel, short story, poetry, translation	Régis Blachère (1900–1973); César Dubler (1915–1966)
30	Eugène Ionesco (1909–1994)	Romania; France	drama, essays	Erik Lindegren (1910–1968)
31	Eyvind Johnson (1900–1976)	Sweden	novel, short story	Carl-Eric Thors (1920–1986)
32	Marcel Jouhandeau (1888–1979)	France	short story, novel	Jean Gaulmier (1905–1997)
33	Pierre Jean Jouve (1887–1976)	France	poetry, novel, literary criticism	Claude Pichois (1925–2005)
34	Ernst Jünger (1895–1998)	West Germany	philosophy, novel, memoir	Rudolf Till (1911–1979)
35	Yasunari Kawabata (1899–1972)	Japan	novel, short story	Harry Martinson (1904–1978)
36	Miroslav Krleža (1893–1981)	Yugoslavia	poetry, drama, short story, novel, essays	The Yugoslavian Writers Association
37	Väinö Linna (1920–1992)	Finland	novel	Aarni Penttilä (1899–1971); Kauko Aatos Ojala (1919–1987); Henry Olsson (1896–1985)
38	Robert Lowell (1917–1977)	United States	poetry, translation	Erik Lindegren (1910–1968)
39	Karl Löwith (1897–1973)	West Germany	philosophy	Franz Dirlmeier (1904–1977)
40	Hugh MacDiarmid (1892–1978)	United Kingdom; Scotland	poetry, essays	David Daiches (1912–2005)
41	André Malraux (1901–1976)	France	novel, essays, literary criticism	Léon Cellier (1911–1976); Pierre Mesnard (1900–1969); John Martin Cocking (1914–1986)
42	Gabriel Marcel (1889–1973)	France	philosophy, drama	Yves Le Hir (1919–2005)
43	Harry Martinson (1904–1978)	Sweden	poetry, novel, drama, essays	Sigurd Erixon (1888–1968)
44	William Somerset Maugham (1874–1965)	United Kingdom	novel, short story, drama, essays	Richard Broxton Onians (1899–1986)
45	Ramón Menéndez Pidal (1869–1968)	Spain	philology, history	Gunnar Tilander (1894–1973)
46	Henri Michaux (1899–1984)	Belgium; France	poetry, essays	Bengt Holmqvist (1924–2002)
47	Yukio Mishima (1925–1970)	Japan	novel, short story, drama, literary criticism	Harry Martinson (1904–1978)
48	Vilhelm Moberg (1898–1973)	Sweden	novel, drama, history	Reginald John McClean (1899–1974); Gösta Bergman (1894–1984)
49	Henry de Montherlant (1895–1972)	France	essays, novel, drama	Eugène Napoleon Tigerstedt (1907–1979)
50	Alberto Moravia (1907–1990)	Italy	novel, literary criticism, essays, drama	Uberto Limentani (1913–1989)
51	Vladimir Nabokov (1899–1977)	Russia; United States	novel, short story, poetry, drama, translation, literary criticism, memoir	Elizabeth Hill (1900–1996)
52	Pablo Neruda (1904–1973)	Chile	poetry	Bengt Holmqvist (1924–2002); Ragnar Josephson (1891–1966)
53	Junzaburō Nishiwaki (1894–1982)	Japan	poetry, literary criticism	Naoshirō Tsuji (1899–1979)
54	José María Pemán (1897–1981)	Spain	poetry, drama, novel, essays, screenplay	José Martínez Ruiz (1873–1967); Ramón Menéndez Pidal (1869–1968)
55	Jacques Perret (1901–1992)	France	novel, short story, memoir, essays	Paul Pédech (1912–2005)
56	Jacques Pirenne (1891–1972)	Belgium	history, law	Pierre Nothomb (1887–1966)
57	Katherine Anne Porter (1890–1980)	United States	short story, essays	George Hendrick (1929–2021)
58	John Boynton Priestley (1894–1984)	United Kingdom	novel, drama, screenplay, literary criticism, essays	Hugh Sydney Hunt (1911–1993)
59	Nelly Sachs (1891–1970)	West Germany; Sweden	poetry, drama	Walter Arthur Berendsohn (1884–1984)
60	Aksel Sandemose (1899–1965)	Denmark; Norway	novel, essays	Harry Martinson (1904–1978); Eyvind Johnson (1900–1976)
61	Jean-Paul Sartre (1905–1980)	France	philosophy, novel, drama, essays, screenplay	The Swedish PEN-Club; Jean Charier (1915–1998)
62	Jean Schlumberger (1877–1968)	France	poetry, essays	Pierre Legouis (1891–1973)
63	Ina Seidel (1885–1974)	West Germany	poetry, novel	Günther Jachmann (1887–1979)
64	Ramón Jose Sender (1901–1982)	Spain	novel, essays	Robert Graves (1895–1985)
65	Charles Percy Snow (1905–1980)	United Kingdom	novel, essays	Friedrich Schubel (1904–1991)
66	Mikhail Sholokhov (1905–1984)	Soviet Union	novel	John Stephenson Spink (1909–1985); Konstantin Fedin (1892–1977); Russian Academy of Sciences; Gorky Institute of World Literature
67	Jun'ichirō Tanizaki (1886–1965)	Japan	novel, short story	Harry Martinson (1904–1978)
68	Gustave Thibon (1903–2001)	France	philosophy	Édouard Delebecque (1910–1990)
69	Pietro Ubaldi (1886–1972)	Italy	philosophy, essays	João de Freitas Guimarães (d. 1996)
70	Giuseppe Ungaretti (1888–1970)	Italy	poetry, essays, literary criticism	Georges Poulet (1901–1991)
71	Arthur David Waley (1889–1966)	United Kingdom	translation, essays	David Hawkes (1923–2009)
72	Mika Waltari (1908–1979)	Finland	short story, novel, poetry, drama, essays, screenplay	Aapeli Saarisalo (1896–1986)
73	Tarjei Vesaas (1897–1970)	Norway	poetry, novel	Edvard Beyer (1920–2003)
74	Simon Vestdijk (1898–1971)	Netherlands	novel, poetry, essays, translation	Royal Netherlands Academy of Arts and Sciences
75	Thornton Wilder (1897–1975)	United States	drama, novel, short story	Fritz Wölcken (1903–1992); Emil Staiger (1908–1987)
76	Judith Wright (1915–2000)	Australia	poetry, literary criticism, novel, essays	Greta Hort (1903–1967); Torsten Dahl (1897–1968); Henri Roddier (1898–1964)

=== Prize Decision ===
On 17 September 1964 the Nobel committee proposed that the prize should be awarded to Jean-Paul Sartre. The second name on the list was Mikhail Sholokov (who was awarded the prize in 1965) and the third name was W.H. Auden. There was some ambivalence within the Swedish Academy to award Sartre. He had been nominated the first time in 1957, but his candidacy was postponed for the future as the Academy was not sure if Sartre's work would have any historical importance. His candidacy was considered and postponed again in 1962 for similar reasons. The publication of Les Mots in 1963 is believed to have strengthened Sartre's candidacy and in October 1964 the Academy decided to award Sartre, their decision was sealed with a final vote on 22 October 1964. A week earlier Sartre, knowing that he was a candidate for the prize, had sent a letter to the Swedish Academy saying he would not accept the award, but as the Academy had already made their decision before the formal final vote they disregarded the letter. The Academy's permanent secretary Karl Ragnar Gierow replied to Sartre's letter saying that the decision had already been made and urged Sartre to reconsider and accept the prize.

== Reactions ==
In a text published in Le Figaro on 23 October 1964, Sartre wrote that he regretted that his refusal to accept the prize had caused a scandal. He explained that he never accepted any prizes or membership of institutions as he believed an author who accepted such things became forever associated with the prize or institution, and that the author should not allow himself to become an institution.

== Aftermath ==
In his memoirs Lars Gyllensten claimed that someone, either Sartre himself or someone related to him, in 1975 had contacted the Swedish Academy and asked if the prize money was available.
