= List of Egyptian Nobel laureates and nominees =

Egyptian Nobel laureates and nominees

⁹

The following is a list of Egyptian Nobel laureates and nominees:

== Egyptian Laureates ==
Year	Image	Laureate	Born	Died	Field	Citation	Country
1978		Muhammad Anwar el-Sadat [محمد أنور السادات]	25 December 1918; Mit Abu El Kom, Monufia, Egypt	6 October 1981; Cairo, Egypt	Peace	"for jointly having negotiated peace between Egypt and Israel in 1978." (awarded together Israeli politician Menachem Begin)	Egypt
1988		Naguib Mahfouz [نجيب محفوظ]	11 December 1911; Cairo, Egypt	30 August 2006; Agouza, Giza, Egypt	Literature	"who, through works rich in nuance – now clear-sightedly realistic, now evocatively ambiguous – has formed an Arabic Literature and art that apply to all mankind."	Egypt
1999		Ahmed Hassan Zewail [أحمد حسن زويل]	26 February 1946; Damanhour, Beheira, Egypt	2 August 2016; Pasadena, California, United States	Chemistry	"for his studies of the transition states of chemical reactions using femtosecond spectroscopy."	Egypt, US
2005		Mohamed Mustafa ElBaradei [محمد مصطفى البرادعي]	17 June 1942; Cairo, Egypt		Peace	"for their efforts to prevent nuclear energy from being used for military purposes and to ensure that nuclear energy for peaceful purposes is used in the safest possible way." (awarded together with the international organization International Atomic Energy Agency (IAEA))	Egypt

== Egypt-born Laureates ==
Year	Image	Laureate	Born	Died	Field	Citation	Country
1964		Dorothy Crowfoot Hodgkin (Note: Hodgkin was born in the English expatriate community in Egypt up until she was 11 years old.)[دوروثي هودجكين]	12 May 1910; Cairo, Egypt	29 July 1994; Ilmington, Warwickshire, United Kingdom	Chemistry	"for her determinations by X-ray techniques of the structures of important biochemical substances."	UK
1994		Yasser Arafat [ياسر عرفات]	24 August 1929 Cario, Egypt	11 November 2004	Peace	"for having opted for the olive branch by signing the so-called Oslo Accords in Washington"	Palestinian Tettorities

== Nominees ==
The following list are the nominees with verified nominations from the Nobel Committee and recognized international organizations. There are also other purported nominees whose nominations are yet to be verified since the archives are revealed 50 years after, among them Nawal El Saadawi [نوال السعداوي] (for Literature), Sonallah Ibrahim [ صنع الله إبراهيم] (for Literature), Alaa Al Aswany [علاء الأسواني] (for Literature), Ahdaf Soueif [ميرال الطحاوي] (for Literature), Yusuf Idris [يوسف إدريس] (for Literature), Miral al-Tahawy [ميرال الطحاوي] (for Literature), Gamal al-Ghitani [جمال الغيطانى] (for Literature), Maikel Nabil Sanad [مايكل نبيل سند] (for Peace), Wael Ghonim [وائل غنيم] (for Peace), Israa Abdel Fattah [إسراء عبد الفتاح] (for Peace), Sister Emmanuelle Cinquin NDS (for Peace), and Abdel Fattah el-Sisi [عبد الفتاح السیسی] (for Peace).

Image	Laureate	Born	Died	Years Nominated	Citation	Nominator(s)
Chemistry (Note: The asterisk (*) denotes nominees who were in Egypt with foreign origin.)
	Dorothy Crowfoot Hodgkin	12 May 1910; Cairo, Egypt	29 July 1994; Ilmington, Warwickshire, United Kingdom	1950, 1956, 1957, 1959, 1960, 1961, 1962, 1963, 1964	"for her pioneering discoveries of the structures of penicillin, vitamin B_{12}, and insulin."	Joseph Donnay (1902–1994), Robert Robinson (1886–1975), et al. (Note: William Lipscomb (1919–2011), Robert Livingston (?), William Wardlaw (?), Leopold Ružička (1887–1976), Otto Bastiansen (1918–1995), Johannes Martin Bijvoet (1892–1980), Carl Martius (1906–1993), Richard L. Synge (1914–1994), Lawrence Bragg (1890–1971), Arne Westgren (1889–1975), Max Perutz (1914–2002), John Kendrew (1917–1997), Linus Pauling (1901–1994), Einar Stenhagen (1911–1973), and Harry Lundin (1896–1973).)
	Ahmed Riad Tourky	16 March 1902; Tanta, Gharbia, Egypt	17 January 1971; Cairo, Egypt	1967	"for his works which dealt with metal corrosion and the development and application of electrochemical methods of research.	Abdel Aziz Ali Mousa (1915-1979)
Literature
	Percival George Elgood*	3 July 1863; Marlborough, Wiltshire, United Kingdom	20 December 1941; Cairo, Egypt	1932		Arthur James Grant (1862–1948)
	Asis Domet*	25 June 1890; Cairo, Egypt	27 June 1943; Berlin, Germany	1936		G. E. Khuri (?)
	Taha Hussein [طه حسين]	15 November 1889; Maghagha, Minya, Egypt	28 October 1973; Cairo, Egypt	1949, 1950, 1951, 1952, 1960, 1961, 1962, 1963, 1964, 1965, 1967, 1968, 1969		Ahmed Lutfi el-Sayed (1872–1963) et al. (Note: Bernard Guyon (1904–1975), members of the Academy of the Arabic Language, Karl Vilhelm Zetterstéen (1866–1953), Olle Hedberg (1899–1974), Henrik Samuel Nyberg (1889–1974), Muhammad Ahmad Khalafallah (1916–1991), Charles Pellat (1914–1992), César Dubler (1915–1966), Régis Blachère (1900–1973), Jussi Taneli Aro (1928–1983), faculty of University of Jordan, professors of Kuwait University, William Montgomery Watt (1909–2006), Sheikh Mustafa Al-Amin (1889–1988), and Abdel Hamid Gouda El Sahhar (1913–1974).)
	Giuseppe Ungaretti*	8 February 1888; Cape Town, South Africa	2 June 1970; Milan, Italy	1955, 1956, 1958, 1964, 1965, 1969, 1970		Thomas Stearns Eliot (1888–1965), et al. (Note: Robert Vivier (1894–1989), Giuseppe De Robertis (1888–1963), Marcel Raymond (1897–1981), Howard Rosario Marraro (1897–1972), Georges Poulet (1902–1991), Otis Fellows (1908–1993), Domenico De Robertis (1921–2011), Lanfranco Caretti (1915–1995), Giacomo Devoto (1897–1974), several professors from the University of Florence, Marcello Gigante (1923–2001), Marco Scovazzi (1923–1971), Carlo Bo (1911–2001), Egon Huber (1907–1986), and Maria Bellonci (1902–1986))
	Tawfiq al-Hakim [توفيق الحكيم]	9 October 1898; Alexandria, Egypt	26 July 1987; Cairo, Egypt	1969		Shawqi Daif (1910–2005)
	Georges Schéhadé*	2 November 1905; Alexandria, Egypt	17 January 1989; Paris, France	1971		Camille Aboussouan (1919–2013)
Peace
	Mohammad Reza Pahlavi (Note: The Shah Mohammad Reza died in exile in Egypt, where he had been granted asylum by President Anwar Sadat.)	26 October 1919; Tehran, Iran	27 July 1980; Cairo, Egypt	1964, 1967	"for introducing important social reforms in Iran that helped secure peace in the Middle East, and negotiating in a conflict between Pakistan and Afghanistan from 1961 to 1963."	Ahmad Matin-Daftari (1897–1971); members of the British Parliament
	Nada Thadet [ندى ثابت] (included in the 1000 PeaceWomen)	began on 2003 in Bern, Switzerland		2005	"in recognition of women’s efforts and visibility in promoting peace all over the world."	Ruth-Gaby Vermont-Mangold (b. 1941); Swisspeace
	Maggie Gobran [ماجي جبران]	1949; Cairo, Egypt		2012, 2020	"in recognition of her constant commitment and dedication to serving illiterate and poor women throughout Egypt."	Dagfinn Høybråten (b. 1957); Garnett Genuis (b. 1987); 5 members of the U.S. House of Representatives
	Coptic Orthodox Church	originated in 42 A.D. in Alexandria, Egypt		2018	"for their refusal to retaliate against deadly and ongoing persecution from governments and terrorist groups in Egypt and elsewhere."	
