= List of Mexican Nobel laureates and nominees =

The following is a list of Mexican Nobel laureates and nominees.

== Laureates ==
Year	Image	Laureate	Born	Died	Field	Citation
Citizens
1982		Alfonso García Robles	20 March 1911 in Zamora, Michoacán, Mexico	2 September 1991 in Mexico City, Mexico	Peace	"for their work for disarmament and nuclear and weapon-free zones." (awarded together with Swedish diplomat Alva Myrdal)
1990		Octavio Paz Lozano	31 March 1914 in Mexico City, Mexico	19 April 1998 in Mexico City, Mexico	Literature	"for impassioned writing with wide horizons, characterized by sensuous intelligence and humanistic integrity."
1995		Mario José Molina Henríquez	19 March 1943 in Mexico City, Mexico	7 October 2020 in Mexico City, Mexico	Chemistry	"for their work in atmospheric chemistry, particularly concerning the formation and decomposition of ozone." (awarded together with Dutch meteorologist Paul J. Crutzen and American chemist Frank Sherwood Rowland)
Expatriates
1982		Gabriel García Márquez	6 March 1927 in Aracataca, Magdalena, Colombia	17 April 2014 in Mexico City, Mexico	Literature	"for his novels and short stories, in which the fantastic and the realistic are combined in a richly composed world of imagination, reflecting a continent's life and conflicts."

== Nominations ==
=== Nominees ===
Since 1949, Mexicans began to receive nominations for the prestigious Swedish prize. The following list are the nominees with verified nominations archived by the Nobel Committee and recognized international organizations. There are also other purported nominees whose nominations are yet to be verified since the archives are revealed 50 years after, among them:

- For Literature: Martín Luis Guzmán (1887–1976), Ernesto Galarza (1905–1984), Juan Rulfo (1917–1986), Elena Garro (1916–1998), Juan José Arreola (1918–2001), Carlos Fuentes (1928–2012), José Emilio Pacheco (1939–2014), Fernando del Paso (1935–2018), Sergio Pitol (1933–2018), Elena Poniatowska (born 1932), Homero Aridjis (born 1940), Adolfo Castañón (born 1952) and Cristina Rivera Garza (born 1964).
- For Peace: Juan Manuel Estrada Juárez (?), José Raúl Vera López (born 1945), Rosa María de la Garza (born 1960), Claudia Sheinbaum (born 1962), and Adán Cortés Salas (born 1993)

Image	Nominee	Born	Died	Years Nominated	Citation	Nominator(s)
Physiology or Medicine
	Arturo Rosenblueth	2 October 1900 in Ciudad Guerrero, Chihuahua, Mexico	20 September 1970 in Mexico City, Mexico	1952	"for his pioneering contributions to cybernetics."	G. Guzman (?); Mexico
Literature
	Rafael Altamira y Crevea	10 February 1866 in Alicante, Spain	1 June 1951 in Mexico City, Mexico	1911	Historia de la Propiedad Comunal (1890); Historia de España y de la Civilización Española (1899)	Aniceto Sela Sampil (1863–1935); Spain
	Rafael Altamira y Crevea	10 February 1866 in Alicante, Spain	1 June 1951 in Mexico City, Mexico	1912	Historia de la Propiedad Comunal (1890); Historia de España y de la Civilización Española (1899)	Fermín Canella Secades (1849–1924); Spain
	Enrique González Martínez	13 April 1871 in Guadalajara, Jalisco, Mexico	19 February 1952 in Mexico City, Mexico	1949	Los senderos ocultos (1911); La palabra del viento (1921); Poemas truncos (1935); Bajo el signo mortal (1942)	Antonio Castro Leal (1896–1981); Mexico
	Enrique González Martínez	13 April 1871 in Guadalajara, Jalisco, Mexico	19 February 1952 in Mexico City, Mexico	1952	Los senderos ocultos (1911); La palabra del viento (1921); Poemas truncos (1935); Bajo el signo mortal (1942)	Academia Mexicana de la Lengua
	Alfonso Reyes Ochoa	17 May 1889 in Monterrey, Nuevo León, Mexico	27 December 1959 in Mexico City, Mexico	1949	Cuestiones estéticas (1911); Visión de Anáhuac (1915); Ifigenia cruel (1924); Discurso por Virgilio (1931); Cantata en la tumba de Federico García Lorca (1937)	Gabriela Mistral (1889–1957); Chile
	Alfonso Reyes Ochoa	17 May 1889 in Monterrey, Nuevo León, Mexico	27 December 1959 in Mexico City, Mexico	1953	Cuestiones estéticas (1911); Visión de Anáhuac (1915); Ifigenia cruel (1924); Discurso por Virgilio (1931); Cantata en la tumba de Federico García Lorca (1937)	Fidelino de Figueiredo (1888–1967); Portugal
	Alfonso Reyes Ochoa	17 May 1889 in Monterrey, Nuevo León, Mexico	27 December 1959 in Mexico City, Mexico	1956	Cuestiones estéticas (1911); Visión de Anáhuac (1915); Ifigenia cruel (1924); Discurso por Virgilio (1931); Cantata en la tumba de Federico García Lorca (1937)	National Autonomous University of Mexico
	Alfonso Reyes Ochoa	17 May 1889 in Monterrey, Nuevo León, Mexico	27 December 1959 in Mexico City, Mexico	1958	Cuestiones estéticas (1911); Visión de Anáhuac (1915); Ifigenia cruel (1924); Discurso por Virgilio (1931); Cantata en la tumba de Federico García Lorca (1937)	Ángel del Río (1900–1962); United States
	Alfonso Reyes Ochoa	17 May 1889 in Monterrey, Nuevo León, Mexico	27 December 1959 in Mexico City, Mexico	1959	Cuestiones estéticas (1911); Visión de Anáhuac (1915); Ifigenia cruel (1924); Discurso por Virgilio (1931); Cantata en la tumba de Federico García Lorca (1937)	Jean Camp (?); France
	María Enriqueta Camarillo Roa	19 February 1872 in Coatepec, Veracruz, Mexico	13 February 1968 in Mexico City, Mexico	1951	Jirón de Mundo (1918); El Secreto (1922); Album sentimental (1926); Cuentecillos de cristal (1928)	Leavitt Olds Wright (1891–1980); United States
	Germán Pardo García	19 July 1902 in Ibagué, Tolima, Colombia	23 August 1991 in Mexico City, Mexico	1967, 1968, 1969	Noche triste (1918); Las voces naturales (1945); Poemas contemporáneos (1949); Labios nocturnos (1965)	James Willis Robb (1918–2010); United States
	Germán Pardo García	19 July 1902 in Ibagué, Tolima, Colombia	23 August 1991 in Mexico City, Mexico	1968, 1970	Noche triste (1918); Las voces naturales (1945); Poemas contemporáneos (1949); Labios nocturnos (1965)	Kurt Leopold Levy (1917–2000); Canada
	Luis Buñuel Portolés	22 February 1900 in Calanda, Aragon, Spain	29 July 1983 in Mexico City, Mexico	1968	List of Luis Buñuel filmography	unnamed nominator
	Luis Buñuel Portolés	22 February 1900 in Calanda, Aragon, Spain	29 July 1983 in Mexico City, Mexico	1972	List of Luis Buñuel filmography	Lars Forssell (1928–2007); Sweden
Peace
	Rafael Altamira y Crevea	10 February 1866 in Alicante, Spain	1 June 1951 in Mexico City, Mexico	1908, 1909, 1911		Fermín Canella Secades (1849–1924); Spain
	Rafael Altamira y Crevea	10 February 1866 in Alicante, Spain	1 June 1951 in Mexico City, Mexico	1933	"for introducing internationalistic and humanitarian reforms in his work as a history professor and for his role in drafting the statutes of the Permanent Court of International Justice at The Hague."	Michel Lhéritier (1889–1951); France
	Rafael Altamira y Crevea	10 February 1866 in Alicante, Spain	1 June 1951 in Mexico City, Mexico	1951	"for his important contribution to international law, especially his extensive authorship on international law."	José Isidro Fabela Alfaro (1882–1964); Mexico
	Rafael Altamira y Crevea	10 February 1866 in Alicante, Spain	1 June 1951 in Mexico City, Mexico	1951	"for his important contribution to international law, especially his extensive authorship on international law."	Jean Sarrailh (1891–1964); France
	Edo Fimmen	18 June 1881 in Nieuwer-Amstel, North Holland, Netherlands	14 December 1942 in Cuernavaca, Morelos, Mexico	1937	"for encouraging a joint action by the European trade unions against the new dangers of war and for the protection of the German working class."	Eugène van Walleghem (1882–1964); Belgium
	Edo Fimmen	18 June 1881 in Nieuwer-Amstel, North Holland, Netherlands	14 December 1942 in Cuernavaca, Morelos, Mexico	1937	"for encouraging a joint action by the European trade unions against the new dangers of war and for the protection of the German working class."	Vladimír Clementis (1902–1952); Slovakia
	Miguel Alemán Valdés	29 September 1900 in Sayula de Alemán, Veracruz, Mexico	14 May 1983 in Mexico City, Mexico	1952	"for his Pan-American work and his contribution for creating international understanding."	José Maria Salazar (?); El Salvador
	Miguel Alemán Valdés	29 September 1900 in Sayula de Alemán, Veracruz, Mexico	14 May 1983 in Mexico City, Mexico	1953	"for his Pan-American work and his contribution for creating international understanding."	Albert Ethéart (?); Haiti
	Adolfo López Mateos	26 May 1909 in Ciudad López Mateos, Mexico	22 September 1969 in Mexico City Mexico	1963		Benjamin Peralta (?); Mexico
	Adolfo López Mateos	26 May 1909 in Ciudad López Mateos, Mexico	22 September 1969 in Mexico City Mexico	1963	"for his many action to create a more peaceful world, being a pacifist and humanitarian, and has done much to prevent war."	José Isidro Fabela Alfaro (1882–1964); Mexico
	Adolfo López Mateos	26 May 1909 in Ciudad López Mateos, Mexico	22 September 1969 in Mexico City Mexico	1964	"for leading the way towards world peace through his declaration of Mexico as a non nuclear zone."	José Isidro Fabela Alfaro (1882–1964); Mexico
	Alfonso García Robles	20 March 1911 in Zamora, Michoacán, Mexico	2 September 1991 in Mexico City, Mexico	1968	"for his work in negotiating the Treaty for the Prohibition of Nuclear Weapons in Latin America, and for his other services to international goodwill and understanding."	Philip Noel-Baker (1889–1982); United Kingdom
	Alfonso García Robles	20 March 1911 in Zamora, Michoacán, Mexico	2 September 1991 in Mexico City, Mexico	1970	"for his support of disarmament in Latin-America and almost making it a non-nuclear zone."	Philip Noel-Baker (1889–1982); United Kingdom
	Alfonso García Robles	20 March 1911 in Zamora, Michoacán, Mexico	2 September 1991 in Mexico City, Mexico	1971	"for being a moving force in securing the adoption of the Disarmament Resolutions by the United Nations General Assembly, which set forth a programme for general and complete disarmament."	Philip Noel-Baker (1889–1982); United Kingdom
	Alfonso García Robles	20 March 1911 in Zamora, Michoacán, Mexico	2 September 1991 in Mexico City, Mexico	1969	"for his years of international activity tending to the progress of law and the strengthening of peace and for his leadership in the work that culminated with the Treaty of Tlatelolco, which prohibits nuclear arms in Latin America."	Antonio Carrillo Flores (1909–1986); Mexico
	Alfonso García Robles	20 March 1911 in Zamora, Michoacán, Mexico	2 September 1991 in Mexico City, Mexico	1971	"for his merits and contribution to the creation of treaties against nuclear-arms in Latin-America, which he contributed greatly to through his intelligence, perseverance, and love for peace."	Jorge Castañeda y Álvarez de la Rosa (1921–1997); Mexico
	Alfonso García Robles	20 March 1911 in Zamora, Michoacán, Mexico	2 September 1991 in Mexico City, Mexico	1971	"because he took a decisive part in the adoption of the Treaty signed in Mexico City on April 12, 1967, establishing a denuclearization regime for Latin America."	René-Jean Dupuy (1918–1997); France
	Samuel Ruíz García	3 November 1924 in Guanajuato, Mexico	24 January 2011 in Mexico City, Mexico	1994, 1995, 1996	"for his efforts to achieve peace in Chiapas and his passionate advocacy for indigenous communities."	Rigoberta Menchú (born 1959) Guatemala; Adolfo Pérez Esquivel (born 1931) Argentina
	12 Mexican women (part of the 1000 PeaceWomen) (Note: The 12 Mexican who formed part in the 1000 PeaceWomen were Elsa Patria Jiménez Flores (born 1957), Guadalupe Hernández Dimas (born ?), Macedonia Blas Flores (born 1958), Maria del Pilar Sertvije de Mariscal (born 1946), Marta Lamas Encabo (born 1947), Martha Lucía Mícher Camarena (born 1954), Nuria Costa Leonardo (born 1960), Rosario Ibarra de Piedra (1927–2022), Sandra Jiménez Loza (born ?), Sara Lovera López (born 1949), Sylvia Aguilera García (born 1974), and Teresa Columba Ulloa Ziáurriz (1949-2025).)	began in 2003 in Bern, Switzerland		2005	"in recognition of women's efforts and visibility in promoting peace all over the world."	Ruth-Gaby Vermont-Mangold (born 1941) Switzerland
	Alejandro Solalinde Guerra	19 March 1945 in Texcoco de Mora, Mexico	—N/a	2017	"because of his many achievements and his unbreakable spirit to serve the most marginalized members of society."	Jorge Olvera García (born 1962); Mexico
	Daniel Alonso Rodríguez	13 November 1998 in Tlaxcoapan, Hidalgo, Mexico	—N/a	2017	"for his unusual sensitivity and dedication to human rights in Mexico."	Juan Gabriel Zamora Jiménez (?); Mexico
