= Daniel Alonso Rodríguez =

Mexican human rights activist

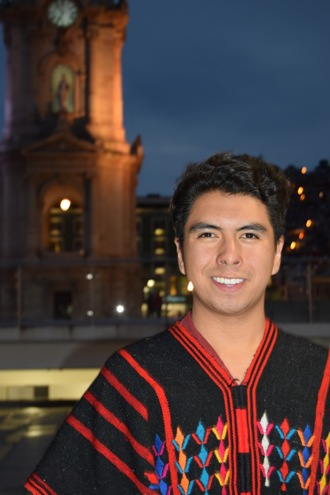
- Daniel Alonso Rodríguez Pérez
- Born: Tlaxcoapan
- Occupations: Human rights activist, politician

Daniel Alonso Rodriguez is a human rights activist in Mexico, who was nominated for the Nobel Peace Prize in 2017. At that time, he was only nineteen years old (same age as Malala Yousafzai when she won), and a law student at the Monterrey Institute of Technology and Higher Studies, Hidalgo campus. His nomination was made by one of his professors, Juan Gabriel Zamora Jimenez, for his unusual sensitivity and dedication to human rights. In March 2017 Rodriguez received a letter from the Nobel committee that his nomination had been accepted, along with those of 317 other candidates. He is one of the youngest ever to be nominated.

Rodriguez is from the municipality of Tlaxcoapan in the state of Hidalgo. His inclination to activism was evident has a young child. In primary school he wondered what he could do to change things in the world. His main activity is conferences and other talks directed at children, youths and adults promoting social reform. He promotes a reform initiative with three parts: peace education, human rights formation and promoting social responsibility in business.

He stated that he was never interested in winning the Nobel Prize. “I do not believe that any activist, any dreamer or any entrepreneur works to win prizes.” In 2014, he received the Hidalgo State Award for Youth for his work in human rights. In October 2017, he was awarded the Congreso con Valores medal from the state of Puebla.

He has registered with the National Action Party of Mexico and is running to be a local representative in Tula de Allende.
