= The Words (book) =

1963 book by Jean-Paul Sartre

- Cover of the French edition
- Author: Jean-Paul Sartre
- Original title: Les Mots
- Translator: Bernard Frechtman
- Language: French
- Genre: Autobiography
- Publisher: Gallimard
- Publication date: 1963
- Publication place: France
- English publication date: September 1964
- Media type: Print (hardback and paperback)
- Pages: 255
- OCLC: 455681411
- Dewey Decimal: 848.91409
- LC Class: PQ2637 .A82

The Words (French: Les Mots) is the philosopher Jean-Paul Sartre's 1963 autobiography.

== Structure and presentation ==
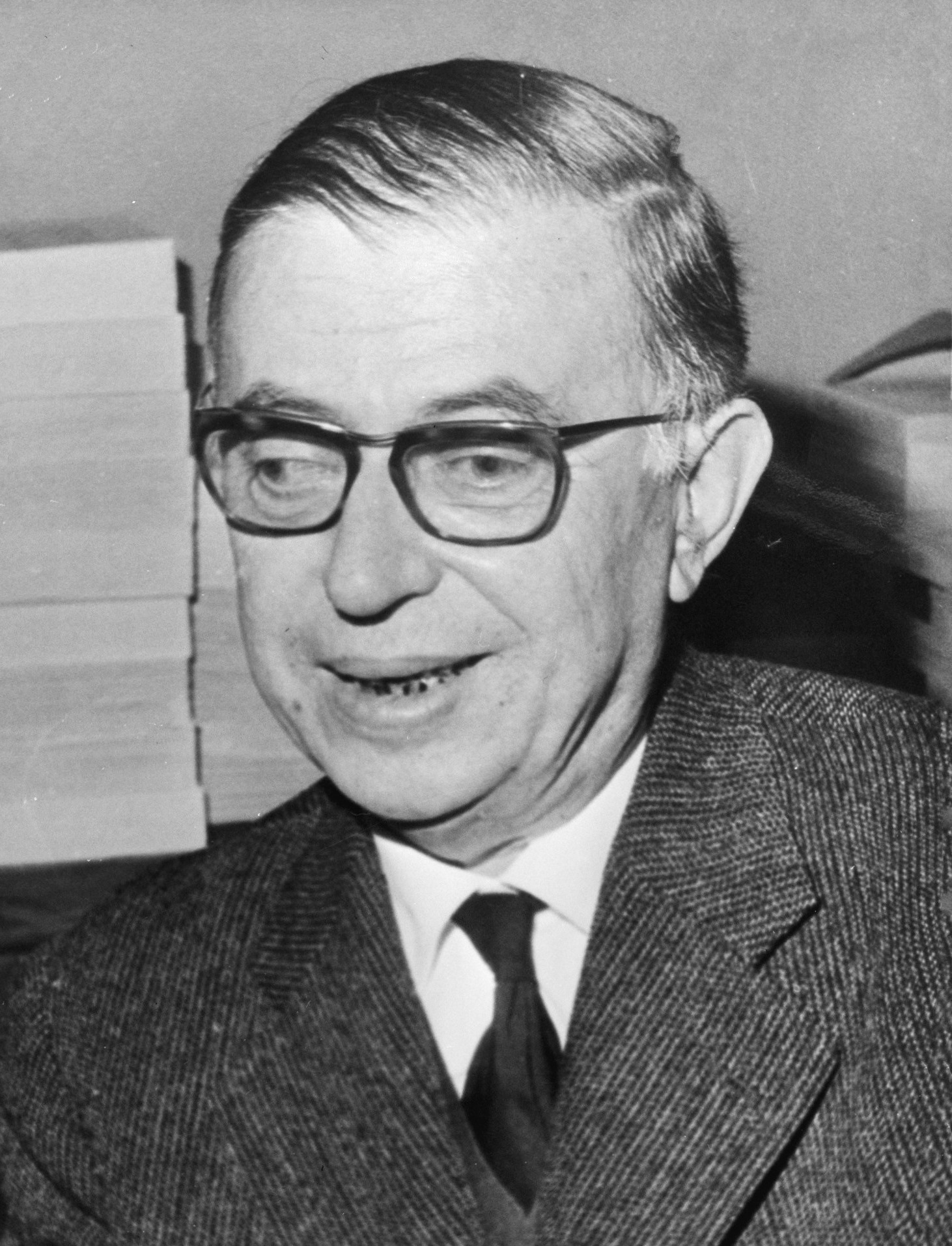
Sartre in 1965

The text is divided into two near-equal parts entitled 'Reading' (Lire) and 'Writing' (Écrire). However, according to Philippe Lejeune, these two parts are only a façade and are not relevant to the chronological progression of the work. He considers the text to instead be divided into five parts which he calls 'acts':

- The first act presents in chronological order the 'prehistory' of the child by giving his family origin.
- The second act evokes the different roles Sartre acted out in his seclusion to an imaginary world, enabled by his family.
- The third act tells of his conscious realization of his imposture, his contingency, his fear of death and his ugliness.
- The fourth act presents the development of a new imposture, in which Sartre took up multiple different postures of writing.
- The fifth act relates Sartre's delusion, which he considers the source of his dynamism, and contains the announcement of a second book which he did not complete before his death.

The first title which Sartre thought of was Jean sans terre.

== Reception ==
The book, consisting of Sartre distancing himself from writing and making his farewells to literature, was very successful for the author and was hailed nearly unanimously as a "literary success". In November of the same year, 1964, he refused the Nobel Prize for Literature awarded for his work, described as "rich in ideas and filled with the spirit of freedom and the quest for truth, [it] has exerted a far-reaching influence on our age."
