= Lê Thị Quý =

- Born: 1950 (age 75–76); Bắc Ninh province, North Vietnam

Lê Thị Quý (born 1950) is a Vietnamese sociologist and Women's Rights activist. She founded Institute for Gender and Development (INGAD) in 2013 and held the position of the director until 2015. She was accredited with being the first person doing research on domestic violence in Vietnam. In 2005, she was one of the 1,000 women nominated for the Nobel Peace Prize. She has been recognized for her contributions to gender research and domestic violence mitigation in Vietnam.

== Career ==
Her research mainly focuses on theories of Feminism, Women and Social Evils.

In 2002, she invented domestic violence prevention ideas with a project called "House of Refuge in the Community” in two domestic violence hotspots which were Thanh Ne (in Kien Xuong District, Thai Binh Province) and Vu Lac Commune (in Thai Binh). The project involved local police, veterans' and women's association to protect women from their husbands' violence. Under the project, domestic violence decreased by 90% as compared to that in the past.

In 2013, she founded Institute for Gender and Development (INGAD) which is under the management of Vietnam Union of Science and Technology Associations - VUSTA.

== Book and research highlights ==
- Vấn đề ngăn chặn nạn buôn bán phụ nữ ở Việt Nam, Labour and Social Publisher Company Limited, 2000.
- Bạo lực gia đình - Một sự sai lệch giá trị (co-author), Social Sciences Publishing House, 2007.
- Mại dâm, quan điểm và giải pháp, Ministry of Labour, Invalids and Social Affairs, 2000.
- Gia đình học (co-author with her husband Professor Đặng Cảnh Khanh), The Publishing House of Political Theory, 2007.
- Giáo trình Xã hội học Giới, Vietnam Education Publishing House Limited Company, 2010.
- Giáo trình Xã hội học Gia đình, Politics - Administration Publishing House, 2011.
- Domestic Violence in Vietnam: Context, Forms, Causes, and Recommendations for Action. Mekong Region Consultation Series, Asia Pacific Forum on Women Law and Development, Chiang Mai, 2000.
