= Juraj Andrassy =

Croatian jurist (1896–1977)

Juraj Andrassy (Zagreb, 1896 – Zagreb, 1977) was a Croatian jurist who brought international recognition to Yugoslav studies of international law.

Andrassy taught law in Zagreb from 1928 to 1937, where he founded the Institute for international law and international relations. He was a member of the Institut de Droit International, which he presided 1969–71.

His publications include more than 600 works. The principal work, International law, a Croatian language textbook, was the basis of the international law education of generations of Yugoslav jurists; the most recent 11th edition dates from 1998.
