= Nam Trực =

- Commune
- Interactive map of Nam Trực
- Coordinates: 20.332749858701032°N 106.17874614922768°E
- Country: Vietnam
- Region: Red River Delta
- Province: Ninh Bình
- Established: 16 June 2025

Area
  - Total: 20.47 km^{2} (7.90 sq mi)

Population (2025)
  - Total: 39,822
  - Density: 1,945/km^{2} (5,040/sq mi)
- Postal code: 07526
- Website: namtruc.ninhbinh.gov.vn

Nam Trực is a commune in Ninh Bình province, Vietnam. It is one of 129 new communes and wards in Ninh Bình province established as part of the 2025 Vietnamese administrative reforms. The commune inherited its name from the former Nam Trực district, Nam Định province.

On 12 June 2025, the National Assembly of Vietnam adopted Resolution No. 202/2025/QH15 on the reorganization of provincial-level administrative units (effective from 12 June 2025). Under the resolution, the entire area and population of Hà Nam province, Nam Định province, and Ninh Bình province were merged to form a new province named Ninh Bình.

On 16 June 2025:

- The National Assembly of Vietnam adopted Resolution No. 203/2025/QH15 amending and supplementing several articles of the Constitution of Vietnam (effective from 16 June 2025). Under the resolution, district-level administrative units nationwide ceased to operate from 1 July 2025.
- The Standing Committee of the National Assembly of Vietnam issued Resolution No. 1674/NQ-UBTVQH15 on the arrangement of commune-level administrative units in Ninh Bình province in 2025 (effective from 16 June 2025). Under the resolution, Nam Giang township, Nam Cường commune, and Nam Hùng commune, formerly part of Nam Trực district, were merged to form a new commune named Nam Trực.
