= Burton Feldman =

American professor (1926–2003)

Burton Edward Feldman (May 3, 1926 – January 10, 2003) was an American professor of English.

He was born in Albany, New York. He spent much of his early life in Troy, New York, before enlisting in the army in 1945, achieving the rank of second lieutenant while serving as a field artillery commander.

Feldman received a B.A. from Union College in Schenectady, New York, in 1949, and then a M.A. in English from Columbia University in 1954. While working on his master's degree at Columbia University, he married Margaret (Peggy) Mary Gildea in 1953.

In 1956, Feldman worked for United Productions of America, helping write episodes of Gerald McBoing Boing, and was also employed to conduct research on storylines in the public domain that could potentially be adopted into cartoons. He then moved on to the University of Chicago to teach and work on his Ph.D., which he received in 1965.

During his time in Chicago, Feldman studied under Leo Strauss and became friends with Mircea Eliade, a Romanian author and scholar of religion. After leaving the University of Chicago, Feldman and his wife spent two years in Europe and Turkey teaching for the University of Maryland.

After returning to the U.S., Feldman was hired by the University of Denver. During his time at the university, Feldman acted as director of undergraduate honors in English (1968–1974), editor of the Denver Quarterly (1970–1975), and director of graduate studies in English (1980–1984). While teaching at the University of Denver, Feldman undertook his professional scholarship in earnest. Working with Professor Robert D. Richardson Jr., Feldman published The Rise of Modern Mythology: 1680 – 1860 in 1972. The book explored the use of myth in the Western world and how it was used in literature and society from 1680 to 1860. Richardson and Feldman continued to work together from 1979 to 1984, and published a 50-volume compendium of rare and important mythological texts used by Romantic poets. The anthology is entitled Myth and Romanticism. Feldman wanted to write a sequel to The Rise of Modern Mythology: 1680 – 1860 that would update it to modern day, but the project was never completed or published.

In 2000, Feldman published a history of the Nobel Prizes entitled The Nobel Prize: A History of Genius, Controversy, and Prestige. Feldman worked on a book tentatively titled Fame and Glory explored the idea of notoriety and the seeking of recognition in literary figures, both authors and characters.

Feldman was also a poet, amateur novelist, and an artist. His poetry was published in a number of different journals over the course of his life, but was unsuccessful in getting a book of poetry published. He was also unsuccessful in publishing any of his several novels during his lifetime.

Feldman retired from the University of Denver in 1998 and died of cancer in Denver, Colorado, on January 10, 2003. At the time of his death, Feldman had been working on a book that was part fact and part historical fiction that chronicled the friendship of Albert Einstein, Wolfgang Pauli, Bertrand Russell, and Kurt Gödel in their declining years. Feldman had tentatively entitled the work Einstein and Friends. Two books were published in 2007, under the supervision of Peggy Feldman and Katherine Williams, with the titles 112 Mercer St.: Einstein, Russell, Godel, Pauli, and the End of Innocence in Science, and Einstein's Genius Club: The True Story of a Group of Scientists Who Changed the World.

Open access – public domain – not under copyright.
