= List of Danish Nobel laureates =

This is a list of Danish Nobel laureates. Since the Nobel Prize was established per the will of Swedish inventor Alfred Nobel in 1895, 14 of the prize winners have been from Denmark. The first Danish Nobel laureate was Niels Ryberg Finsen, who won a Nobel Prize for medicine in 1903 for his work on using light therapy to treat diseases. The most recent Danish Nobel Prize winner was Morten Meldal who won the prize in chemistry in 2022 for the development of click chemistry and bioorthogonal chemistry. To date, of the 14 Nobel Prizes won by Danish people, five have been for medicine, three have been for physics, three have been for literature, two have been for chemistry, and one has been for peace.

== List ==
| # | Year | Winner | Field |
|---|---|---|---|
| 1 | 1903 | Niels Ryberg Finsen | Medicine |
| 2 | 1908 | Fredrik Bajer | Peace |
| 3 & 4 | 1917 | Karl Adolph Gjellerup and Henrik Pontoppidan | Literature |
| 5 | 1920 | August Krogh | Medicine |
| 6 | 1922 | Niels Bohr | Physics |
| 7 | 1926 | Johannes Fibiger | Medicine |
| 8 | 1943 | Henrik Dam | Medicine |
| 9 | 1944 | Johannes V. Jensen | Literature |
| 10 & 11 | 1975 | Aage Bohr and Ben Roy Mottelson | Physics |
| 12 | 1984 | Niels Kaj Jerne | Medicine |
| 13 | 1997 | Jens Christian Skou | Chemistry |
| 14 | 2022 | Morten P. Meldal | Chemistry |
