= Sef Imkamp =

Dutch politician

Sef Imkamp (10 March 1925, in Beek – 2 July 2013, in The Hague) was a Dutch politician.

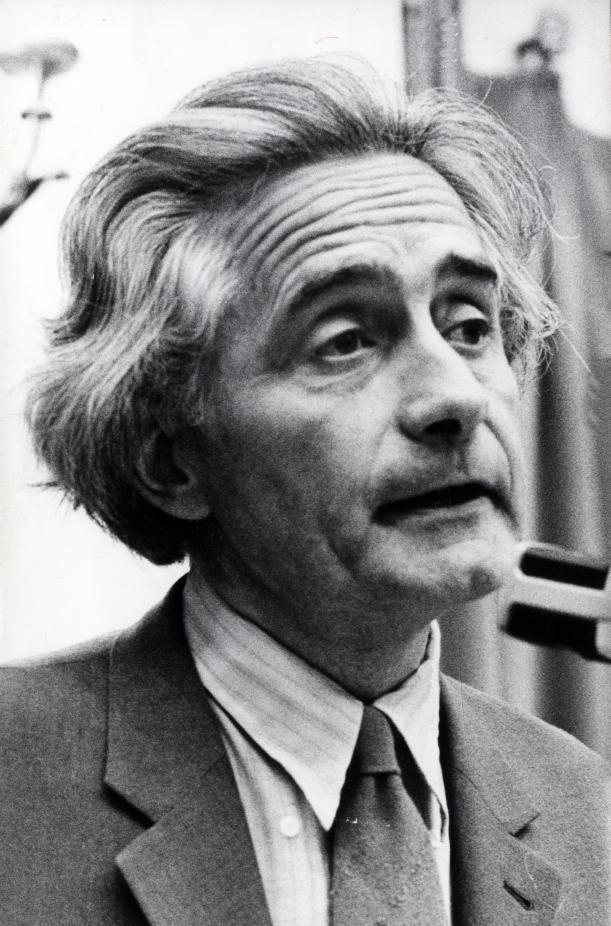
