= List of Welsh Nobel laureates =

Listed below are the Nobel laureates born in Wales, in alphabetical order. Wales is a constituent part of the United Kingdom; this means that Welsh Nobel laureates are included in the list of Nobel laureates for Great Britain by the Nobel Foundation.

== Nobel laureates ==
=== Sir Clive Granger ===
Sir Clive Granger (4 September 1934 – 27 May 2009) was born in Swansea and was awarded the Nobel Memorial Prize in Economic Sciences in 2003, sharing the prize with Robert F. Engle.

=== Brian Josephson ===
Brian Josephson (born 4 January 1940) is best known for his pioneering work on superconductivity and quantum tunnelling. He was born in Cardiff and won the Nobel Prize in Physics in 1973 for the prediction of the Josephson effect.

=== Bertrand Russell ===
The philosopher Bertrand Russell (18 May 1872 – 2 February 1970) won the Nobel Prize in Literature in 1950 'in recognition of his varied and significant writings in which he champions humanitarian ideals and freedom of thought’. Russell was born at Cleddon Hall in Trellech, Monmouthshire, and died at his home at Plas Penrhyn, Penrhyndeudraeth, Merionethshire.
