= List of Swiss Nobel laureates =

The Nobel Prize

Laureates by field
Field	Number of recipients
Physics	7
Chemistry	8
Physiology or Medicine	8
Literature	2
Peace	3
Economic Sciences	0

The Nobel Prize is a set of annual international awards bestowed on "those who conferred the greatest benefit on humankind" in the fields of Physics, Chemistry, Physiology or Medicine, Literature, Peace, and Economic Sciences, (Note: The Sveriges Riksbank Prize in Economic Sciences is an additional prize that was established in 1968 by the Bank of Sweden and was first awarded in 1969. Although not technically a Nobel Prize, it is identified with the award and the winners are announced with the Nobel Prize recipients, and the Prize in Economic Sciences is presented at the Nobel Prize Award Ceremony.) instituted by Alfred Nobel's last will, which specified that a part of his fortune be used to create the prizes. Each laureate (recipient) receives a gold medal, a diploma and a sum of money, which is decided annually by the Nobel Foundation. They are widely recognized as one of the most prestigious honours awarded in the aforementioned fields.

First instituted in 1901, the Nobel Prize has been awarded to a total of 965 individuals and 27 organizations as of 2023. Among them, 28 Swiss nationals have been honored with the Nobel Prize. (Note: Some lists, such as the one published by the Neue Zürcher Zeitung, count a total of 30 individuals including some that acquired the nationality after the award, as well as Hermann Staudinger, a German national who was a Swiss resident.) Additionally, two laureates acquired Swiss citizenship through naturalization after the award: Wolfgang Pauli and Jack Steinberger. (Note: Not included in the list is Kofi Annan, Ghanaian diplomat and secretary-general of the United Nations who received the Peace Nobel prize in 2000. Annan was granted honorary citizenship from Geneva in 2001; however, in Swiss law, an honorary citizenship does not have the same effects of naturalization.)

Nine organizations headquartered in Switzerland have received the Nobel Peace Prize. (Note: This is based on the global list of awarded organizations published by the Nobel Prize Outreach. Non-comprehensive lists have been published by the Schweizer Radio und Fernsehen, with seven entries, and the Canton of Geneva, featuring the eight Geneva-based organizations who received the award.) The Office of the United Nations High Commissioner for Refugees has been awarded twice, and the International Committee of the Red Cross three times. Five of these organizations were also founded in Switzerland, and eight of them had their headquarters in Geneva, a city hosting more than 40 international organizations and 750 non-governmental organizations.

The first Nobel Peace Prize, awarded in 1901, went to the Swiss humanitarian Henry Dunant. The latest Swiss laureates are Michel Mayor and Didier Queloz, who received the Nobel Prize in Physics in 2019. The 28 prizes are distributed as follows: eight for medicine, eight for chemistry, seven for physics, three for peace, and two for literature. No Swiss national has yet received a Nobel Memorial Prize in Economic Sciences.

Switzerland is among the countries with the highest number of Nobel laureates, both in total and per capita. Several factors have been suggested as possible explanation, including large public funding for research, the presence of highly ranked universities such as ETH Zurich and EPFL, and the neutrality of Switzerland in the two World Wars, which attracted scientists from abroad. The Nobel Prize has also been often recognized as being biased towards Western countries. According to Nobel laureate Werner Arber, the large number of awards to Swiss nationals is "likely a statistical anomaly", while Richard R. Ernst believes the number of Swiss laureates will keep increasing as the country still attracts talent.

== Laureates ==
Swiss Nobel laureates
Year	Image	Laureate	Born	Died	Field	Rationale
1901	Portrait of Henry Dunant	Henry Dunant, co-founder of the Red Cross	8 May 1828 in Geneva	30 October 1910 in Heiden	Peace	"for his humanitarian efforts to help wounded soldiers and create international understanding" prize shared with Frédéric Passy
1902	Portrait of Albert Gobat	Charles Albert Gobat, politician and director of the Permanent International Peace Bureau	21 May 1843 in Tramelan	16 March 1914 in Bern	Peace	"for his eminently practical administration of the Inter-Parliamentary Union" prize shared with Élie Ducommun
1902	Portrait of Élie Ducommun	Élie Ducommun, peace activist and director of the Permanent International Peace Bureau	19 February 1833 in Geneva	7 December 1906 in Bern	Peace	"for his untiring and skilful directorship of the Bern Peace Bureau" prize shared with Charles Albert Gobat
1909	Portrait of Emil Theodor Kocher	Emil Theodor Kocher, physician who introduced scientific methods in surgery	28 August 1841 in Bern	27 July 1917 in Bern	Physiology or Medicine	"for his work on the physiology, pathology and surgery of the thyroid gland"
1913	Portrait of Alfred Werner	Alfred Werner, professor at the University of Zurich	12 December 1866 in Mulhouse, France acquired Swiss citizenship in 1894	15 November 1919 in Zurich	Chemistry	"in recognition of his work on the linkage of atoms in molecules by which he has thrown new light on earlier investigations and opened up new fields of research especially in inorganic chemistry"
1919	Portrait of Carl Spitteler	Carl Spitteler, poet and writer	24 April 1845 in Liestal	29 December 1924 in Lucerne	Literature	"in special appreciation of his epic, Olympian Spring"
1920	Portrait of Charles Édouard Guillaume	Charles Édouard Guillaume, physicist, head of the International Bureau of Weights and Measures	15 February 1861 in Fleurier	13 June 1938 in Sèvres, France	Physics	"in recognition of the service he has rendered to precision measurements in Physics by his discovery of anomalies in nickel steel alloys"
1921	Portrait of Albert Einstein	Albert Einstein, theoretical physicist who developed the theory of relativity	14 March 1879 in Ulm, Germany acquired Swiss citizenship in 1901	18 April 1955 in Princeton, US	Physics	"for his services to Theoretical Physics, and especially for his discovery of the law of the photoelectric effect"
1937	Portrait of Paul Karrer	Paul Karrer, organic chemist known for his contributions on vitamins	21 April 1889 in Moscow, Russia	18 June 1971 in Zurich, Switzerland	Chemistry	"for his investigations on carotenoids, flavins and vitamins A and B2" prize shared with Norman Haworth
1939	Portrait of Leopold Ruzicka	Leopold Ružička, chemist, professor at ETH Zurich	13 September 1887 in Vukovar, Austria-Hungary acquired Swiss citizenship in 1917	26 September 1976 in Zurich	Chemistry	"for his work on polymethylenes and higher terpenes" prize shared with Adolf Butenandt
1946	Portrait of Hermann Hesse	Hermann Hesse, poet, novelist and painter	2 July 1877 in Calw, Germany acquired Swiss citizenship in 1924	9 August 1962 in Montagnola	Literature	"for his inspired writings which, while growing in boldness and penetration, exemplify the classical humanitarian ideals and high qualities of style"
1948	Portrait of Paul Hermann Müller	Paul Hermann Müller, chemist at J. R. Geigy AG who synthesized DDT	12 January 1899 in Olten	12 October 1965 in Basel	Physiology or Medicine	"for his discovery of the high efficiency of DDT as a contact poison against several arthropods"
1949	Portrait of Walter Rudolf Hess	Walter Rudolf Hess, physiologist and professor at the University of Zurich who mapped areas of the brain	17 March 1881 in Frauenfeld	12 August 1973 in Ascona	Chemistry	"for his discovery of the functional organization of the interbrain as a coordinator of the activities of the internal organs" prize shared with Egas Moniz
1950	Portrait of Tadeusz Reichstein	Tadeusz Reichstein, chemist and professor at the University of Basel who contributed to the isolation of cortisone	20 July 1897 in Włocławek, Poland acquired Swiss citizenship in 1914	1 August 1996 in Basel	Physiology or Medicine	"for their discoveries relating to the hormones of the adrenal cortex, their structure and biological effects" prize shared with Edward Calvin Kendall and Philip Showalter Hench
1951	Portrait of Max Theiler	Max Theiler, South African-American virologist and physician	30 January 1899 in Pretoria, South Africa (Note: The Historical Dictionary of Switzerland reports that Theiler was Swiss citizen by birth to a Swiss parent; he later acquired honorary citizenship from Hasle in 1952. A SERI report states he held Swiss citizenship at the time of the award.)	11 August 1972 in New Haven, US	Physiology or Medicine	"for his discoveries concerning yellow fever and how to combat it"
1952	Portrait of Felix Bloch	Felix Bloch, physicist, first director-general of CERN and among the developers of nuclear magnetic resonance	23 October 1905 in Zurich	10 September 1983 in Zurich	Physics	"for their development of new methods for nuclear magnetic precision measurements and discoveries in connection therewith" prize shared with Edward Mills Purcell
1957	Portrait of Daniel Bovet	Daniel Bovet, pharmacologist who discovered antihistamines	23 March 1907 in Neuchâtel	8 April 1992 in Rome, Italy	Physiology or Medicine	"for his discoveries relating to synthetic compounds that inhibit the action of certain body substances, and especially their action on the vascular system and the skeletal muscles"
1975	Portrait of Vladimir Prelog	Vladimir Prelog, organic chemist, professor at ETH Zurich	23 July 1906 in Sarajevo, Austria-Hungary acquired Swiss citizenship in 1959	7 January 1998 in Zurich	Chemistry	"for his research into the stereochemistry of organic molecules and reactions" prize shared with John Cornforth
1978	Portrait of Werner Arber	Werner Arber, microbiologist and geneticist, professor at the University of Geneva and Basel	3 June 1929 in Gränichen	—	Physiology or Medicine	"for the discovery of restriction enzymes and their application to problems of molecular genetics" prize shared with Daniel Nathans and Hamilton O. Smith
1986	Portrait of Heinrich Rohrer	Heinrich Rohrer, physicist, IBM Fellow	6 June 1933 in Buchs	16 May 2013 in Wollerau	Physics	"for their design of the scanning tunneling microscope" prize shared with Gerd Binning and Ernst Ruska
1987	Portrait of K. Alex Müller	K. Alex Müller, physicist, IBM Fellow	20 April 1927 in Basel	9 January 2023 in Zurich	Physics	"for their important break-through in the discovery of superconductivity in ceramic materials" prize shared with J. Georg Bednorz
1991	Portrait of Richard R. Ernst	Richard R. Ernst, physical chemist, professor at ETH Zurich	14 August 1933 in Winterthur	4 June 2021 in Winterthur	Chemistry	"for his contributions to the development of the methodology of high resolution nuclear magnetic resonance (NMR) spectroscopy"
1992	Portrait of Edmond Fischer	Edmond H. Fischer, biochemist, professor at the University of Washington	6 April 1920 in Shanghai, China acquired Swiss citizenship in 1947	27 August 2021 in Seattle, US	Physiology or Medicine	"for their discoveries concerning reversible protein phosphorylation as a biological regulatory mechanism" prize shared with Edwin G. Krebs
1996	Portrait of Rolf Zinkernagel	Rolf M. Zinkernagel, professor of experimental immunology at the University of Zurich	6 January 1944 in Basel	—	Physiology or Medicine	"for their discoveries concerning the specificity of the cell mediated immune defence" prize shared with Peter C. Doherty
2002	Portrait of Kurt Wuthrich	Kurt Wüthrich, chemist and biophysicist, professor at ETH Zurich and The Scripps Research Institute	4 October 1938 in Aarburg	—	Chemistry	"for his development of nuclear magnetic resonance spectroscopy for determining the three-dimensional structure of biological macromolecules in solution" prize shared with John B. Fenn and Koichi Tanaka
2017	Portrait of Jacques Dubochet	Jacques Dubochet, biophysicist, professor at the University of Lausanne	8 June 1942 in Aigle	—	Chemistry	"for developing cryo-electron microscopy for the high-resolution structure determination of biomolecules in solution" prize shared with Joachim Frank and Richard Henderson
2019	Portrait of Michel Mayor	Michel Mayor, astrophysicist, professor at the University of Geneva	12 January 1942 in Lausanne	—	Physics	"for the discovery of an exoplanet orbiting a solar-type star" prize shared with Jim Peebles and Didier Queloz
2019	Portrait of Didier Queloz	Didier Queloz, astronomer, professor at the University of Cambridge and Geneva	23 February 1966 in Geneva	—	Physics	"for the discovery of an exoplanet orbiting a solar-type star" prize shared with Jim Peebles and Michel Mayor

=== Individuals who acquired Swiss citizenship after the award ===
Nobel laureates who acquired Swiss citizenship after the award
Year	Image	Laureate	Born	Died	Field	Rationale
1945	Portrait of Wolfgang Pauli	Wolfgang Pauli, Austrian theoretical physicist and pioneer of quantum mechanics	25 April 1900 in Vienna, Austria naturalized Swiss in 1949 (place of origin: Zollikon) (Note: Pauli's initial application for Swiss citizenship in 1940 was refused as he was deemed "not assimilable".)	15 December 1958 in Zurich	Physics	"for the discovery of the Exclusion Principle, also called the Pauli Principle"
1988	Portrait of Jack Steinberger	Jack Steinberger, American physicist noted for his work with neutrinos	25 May 1921 in Bad Kissingen, Germany naturalized Swiss in 2000 (place of origin: Geneva)	12 December 2020 in Geneva	Physics	"for the neutrino beam method and the demonstration of the doublet structure of the leptons through the discovery of the muon neutrino" prize shared with Leon M. Lederman and Melvin Schwartz

=== Organizations headquartered in Switzerland who received the Nobel Peace Prize ===
Organizations headquartered in Switzerland who received the Nobel Peace Prize
Year	Logo	Organization	Founded	Headquarters	Rationale
1910	Logo of the IPB	Permanent International Peace Bureau	1891, Bern	Bern (1891–1924); Geneva (1924–2017); Berlin, Germany (2017–present)	"for acting as a link between the peace societies of the various countries, and helping them to organize the world rallies of the international peace movement"
1917	Flag of the ICRC	International Committee of the Red Cross (ICRC)	1863, Geneva	Geneva	"for the efforts to take care of wounded soldiers and prisoners of war and their families"
1938	—	Nansen International Office for Refugees	1921, Geneva	Geneva	"for having carried on the work of Fridtjof Nansen to the benefit of refugees across Europe"
1944	Flag of the ICRC	International Committee of the Red Cross (ICRC)	1863, Geneva	Geneva	"for the great work it has performed during the war on behalf of humanity"
1954	Logo of the UNHCR, the UN Refugee Agency	Office of the United Nations High Commissioner for Refugees (UNHCR)	1950, Geneva	Geneva	"for its efforts to heal the wounds of war by providing help and protection to refugees all over the world"
1963	Flag of the ICRC	International Committee of the Red Cross (ICRC)	1863, Geneva	Geneva	"for promoting the principles of the Geneva Convention and cooperation with the UN" prize shared with the League of Red Cross Societies
1963	Logo of the League of the Red Cross Societies	League of Red Cross Societies	1919, Paris	Geneva	"for promoting the principles of the Geneva Convention and cooperation with the UN" prize shared with the International Committee of the Red Cross
1969	Flag of the ILO	International Labour Organization (ILO)	1919, Geneva	Geneva	"for creating international legislation insuring certain norms for working conditions in every country"
1981	Logo of the UNHCR, the UN Refugee Agency	Office of the United Nations High Commissioner for Refugees (UNHCR)	1950, Geneva	Geneva	"for promoting the fundamental rights of refugees"
1999	Logo of Medecins Sans Frontieres, in English Doctors Without Borders	Doctors Without Borders	1971, Paris	Geneva	"in recognition of the organisation's pioneering humanitarian work on several continents"
2007	Logo of the IPCC, Intergovernmental Panel on Climate Change	Intergovernmental Panel on Climate Change (IPCC)	1988, New York City, US	Geneva	"for their efforts to build up and disseminate greater knowledge about man-made climate change, and to lay the foundations for the measures that are needed to counteract such change" prize shared with Al Gore
2017	Logo of the ICAN	International Campaign to Abolish Nuclear Weapons (ICAN)	2007, Australia	Geneva	"for its work to draw attention to the catastrophic humanitarian consequences of any use of nuclear weapons and for its ground-breaking efforts to achieve a treaty-based prohibition of such weapons"

== See also ==
- Science and technology in Switzerland
- List of international organizations based in Geneva
- List of Nobel laureates by country
