= Régis Blachère =

French orientalist and translator of the Quran

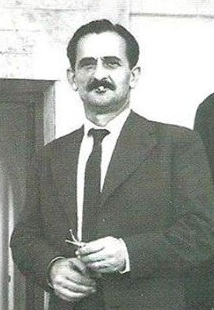
- Born: 30 June 1900; Montrouge, France
- Died: 7 August 1973 (aged 73); Paris, France
- Occupations: Orientalist; Translator

Régis Blachère (30 June 1900 – 7 August 1973) was a French orientalist and translator of the Quran.

== Biography ==
Known as Agrégé in Arabic (1924), he was a member of the Institut de France (1972), director of studies at the Institut des hautes études marocaines in Rabat (1930-1935), and professor of Arabic at the Institut national des langues et civilisations orientales (1935-1950), professor of Arabic literature at the Sorbonne (1950-1970), director of studies at the École pratique des hautes études (1950-1968), director of the Institut d'études islamiques at the University of Paris (1956-1965), director of the Centre de lexicographie arabe, associated with the CNRS (1962-1971).

We owe him a critical translation of the Quran (1947) with an attempt to rearrange the Surah in the chronological order of their revelation.

== Bibliography ==
- 1975: Analecta, Institut français de Damas, Damas, 1975.
- 2002: Le Coran, Presses universitaires de France, (Que sais-je?, n° 1245), ISBN 2-130-52760-4
- 1956: Dans les pas de Mahomet, Hachette.
- 1960: Dictionnaire arabe-français-anglais (Langue classique et moderne), Maisonneuve et Larose.
- 1967: Dictionnaire arabe-français-anglais Arabic/French/English Dictionary - Langue classique et moderne, Maisonneuve et Larose.
- 1958: Éléments de l'arabe classique, Quatrième édition revue et corrigée, G.-P. Maisonneuve.
- 1970: Exercices d'arabe classique, Adrien Maisonneuve, ISBN 2-7200-1017-0
- Extraits des principaux géographes arabes du Moyen Age.
- Grammaire de l'arabe classique, Maisonneuve et Larose, ISBN 2-7068-0613-3
- 1952: Histoire de la littérature arabe : des origines à la fin du XVe siècle de J.-C., Volume 1, Adrien Maisonneuve, ISBN 2-7200-0205-4
- 1964: Histoire de la littérature arabe : des origines à la fin du XVe siècle de J.-C., Volume 2, Adrien Maisonneuve, ISBN 2-7200-0206-2, ISBN 2-7200-0127-9
- 1964: Histoire de la littérature arabe : des origines à la fin du XVe siècle de J.-C., Volume 3, Adrien Maisonneuve, ISBN 2-7200-0207-0
- Introduction au Coran, Maisonneuve et Larose, ISBN 2-7068-1031-9
- 1949–1977: Le Coran. Traduction selon un essai de reclassement des sourates, G.-P. Maisonneuve.
- 1952: Le problème de Mahomet - Essai de biographie critique du fondateur de l'Islam, un volume de 135 pages, Presses universitaires de France.
