= Tran Minh Tiet =

Vietnamese politician and judge

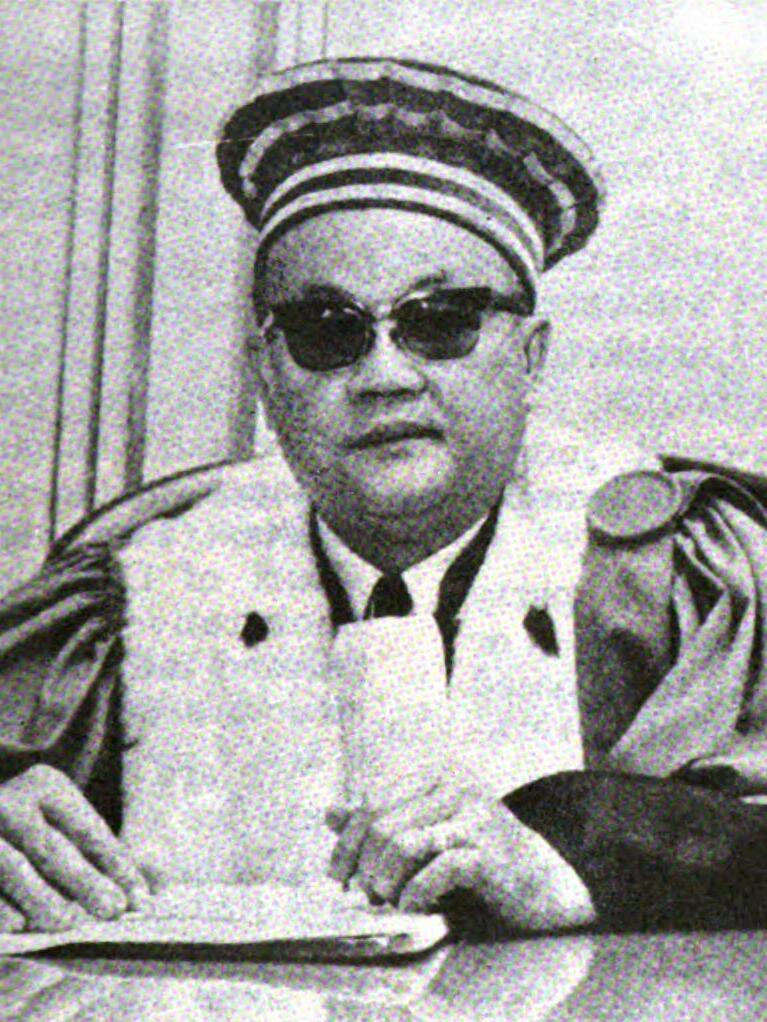
Tran Minh Tiet

Tran Minh Tiet or Trần Minh Tiết (December 28, 1922 – April 18, 1986) was a Minister of the Interior, and later Chief Justice of the Supreme Court, of the Republic of Vietnam.

== Government service ==
=== Interior Minister ===
Tran Minh Tiet served as Minister of the Interior during the presidency of Ngo Dinh Diem (1954–1963), and so would sit in the South Vietnamese cabinet. In 1960 Diem set up a National Security Council, designed to regularly bring together "the General Staff, the Defense Staff, the Ministry of Interior," and other officials.

With regard to territorial administration, "the Ministry of Interior exercised supervision over questions of finance and supply." The Ministry's responsibilities likely ranged from issues involving police work and counterinsurgency, to civil administration of rural populations. The Interior Ministry indirectly affected land reform programs. Under Diem, an influx of army officers into the position of Province Chief across the South Vietnamese countryside unintentionally worked to weaken the civilian administration.

=== Chief Justice ===
In 1968 the National Assembly, meeting in Saigon and following the newly adopted Constitution, chose Tran Minh Tiet and eight others as the new Justices of the Supreme Court. Only "lawyers, prosecutors, and presiding judges" had been eligible. Of those chosen, only three including Tiet had received more than 100 Assembly votes. The Assembly members had so acted despite the fact that during 1967–1968 Tiet had on occasion "been openly critical of President Thieu and his administration". Tiet had become "known for his honesty and independence." Following the Assembly's establishment of the Supreme Court, its nine newly minted members then chose as their first Chief Justice: Tran Minh Tiet.

The Republic of Vietnam's Constitution of 1967 contained provisions for the Supreme Court. It was described as "the highest court of appeal with authority to pass on the constitutionality of legislation." The Court was also to act as "the final judge of presidential elections [with the] power to outlaw political parties." The National Assembly chose the members of the Supreme Court after a screening process. "[T]he Supreme Court legally became the equal of the legislative and executive branches [under the] Constitution of 1967" but the president retained formidable powers. The "principle of executive dominance" is strong in Vietnamese politics, and presidential power usually controls.

==== Chau case ====
Justice Tiet took the lead in the Supreme Court's ruling regarding the controversial case of Trần Ngọc Châu in 1970. President Thiệu (1967–1975) had become determined to prosecute Chau in court and then have him sent to prison, despite his legislative immunity as a deputy in the National Assembly. Thiệu put strong political pressure on the legislature, and issued threats against its members. Consequently, Châu was arrested and then tried by a military court. The Supreme Court, however, invalidated Châu's prison sentence. One commentator opines that the case established "the supremacy of the civil over the military judiciary" and further "declared the independence of the legislative and judicial structures". Although "the Supreme Court ruled that the sentence was illegal... it did not order his release."

"The Supreme Court was not by any definition a serious block to executive misuse of power, nor did its members advance such pretenses. But this transplanted American-style institution provided an avenue of redress in the face of governmental transgressions against the Constitution. ... As Chau could testify, the subtleties of a Supreme Court declaration did not guarantee his release from prison... . ¶ [Yet] for the first time the executive [was] not absolutely supreme."

==== Other rulings ====
Also in 1970 the Supreme Court, among other matters, declared that the current "austerity tax" promulgated by the Thieu regime as part of its economic policy was unconstitutional. This legal ruling forced the government "to try an equalization tax as a substitute anti-inflation measure". In another case, the Supreme Court held that "the special military field tribunals [were] unconstitutional."

== Re-education camp ==
After the Fall of Saigon in 1975 and the commencement of Communist rule, Tran Minh Tiet was required to report for re-education camp. He was then taken to Long Thành Re-education Center. There along with him were "hundreds of senior judges, cabinet members, senators, congressmen, provincial governors, district chiefs, heads of various administrative and technical departments, and political party leaders" from the fallen government of South Vietnam. They received the victorious regime's new instructions on the ruling party's ideology. After several years, he was moved to Thủ Đức Prison, from which he was later released.

== Freedom, exile ==
Freed from communist incarceration, eventually Tiet was allowed to leave the country. The jurist first settled in France, but from there he and his family migrated to the United States. Tran Minh Tiet, while residing in Monterey Park, California, died on April 18, 1986. His social identities included being a Catholic whose origins were in southern Vietnam.

== Bibliography ==
- Dennis J. Duncanson, Government and Revolution in Vietnam (Oxford University 1968).
- Allan E. Goodman, Politics in War. The bases of political community in South Vietnam (Harvard University 1973).
- Charles A. Joiner, The Politics of Massacre. Political processes in South Vietnam (Temple University 1974).
- Howard R. Penniman, Elections in South Vietnam (Washington: A.E.I.; & Stanford: Hoover Inst. 1972).
  - John C. Donnell and Charles A. Joiner, editors, Electoral Politics in South Vietnam (Lexington: D. C. Heath 1974).
  - Keesing's Research Report, editor, South Vietnam: A political history 1954-1970 (New York: Scribner's Sons 1970).
- Elizabeth Pond, Vụ Án Trần Ngọc Châu (Westminster: Vietbook USA 2009).
- Tran Ngoc Chau with Ken Fermoyle, Vietnam Labyrinth (Texas Tech University 2012).

== Another Trần Minh Tiết ==
Another notable Vietnamese bore the same name. Trần Minh Tiết (1918–1990) was a professor, an academic who resided and taught in France. He was the author of several books on the politics of Vietnam and Asia.

== See also ==
- Law of Vietnam
