= Finsen =

Finsen may refer to:

== People ==
- Lawrence Finsen, American ethicist
- Niels Ryberg Finsen (1860–1904), Faroese-Icelandic physician and scientist
- Susan Finsen, American ethicist
- William Stephen Finsen (1905–1979), South African astronomer

== Other uses ==
- Finsen (crater), on the Moon
- Finsen Laboratory, in Copenhagen
- 1794 Finsen, a minor planet
