= List of Nobel laureates by country =

This is a list of Nobel Prize laureates by country. Listings for Economics refer to the related Nobel Memorial Prize in Economic Sciences. The Nobel Prizes and the Prize in Economic Sciences have been awarded 577 times to 889 recipients, of which 26 awards (all Peace Prizes) were to organizations. Due to some recipients receiving multiple awards, the total number of recipients is 860 individuals and 22 organizations.

The present list ranks laureates under the country/countries that are stated by the Nobel Prize committee on its website. The list does not distinguish between laureates who received a full prize and the majority who shared a prize. Some laureates are listed under more than one country, because the official website mentions multiple countries in relation to the laureate. If a country is merely mentioned as the place of birth, an asterisk (*) is used in the respective listing to indicate this. In this case, the birth country is mentioned in italics at the other listings of this laureate.

Organizations are listed here if the Nobel Prize committee relates them to a single country.

== Summary ==
Number of Nobel laureates by country
Country	Number of Nobel laureates (number of Nobel Prizes)
United States	426 (429) (Note: John Bardeen awarded twice in physics; Linus C. Pauling awarded once in chemistry and once in peace; K. Barry Sharpless awarded twice in chemistry)
United Kingdom	143 (144) (Note: Frederick Sanger awarded twice in chemistry - 1958 and 1980)
Germany	116
France	78 (79) (Note: Marie Curie awarded once in physics and once in chemistry)
Japan	34
Sweden	34
Russia/USSR	30
Canada	30
Switzerland	27
Austria	25
Netherlands	22
Italy	21
Poland	19 (20)
Hungary	16
Australia	15
Israel	14
Denmark	14
Norway	14
India	13
Belgium	12
South Africa	12
Ireland	11
Spain	8
Ukraine	7
Belarus	6
Czechia	6
Egypt	6
Taiwan	1–6 (Note: Samuel C. C. Ting, Chen-Ning Yang, and Tsung-Dao Lee were born outside Taiwan during Republic of China Rule on mainland, and are thus generally considered Chinese-American rather than Taiwanese-American.)
Argentina	5
Finland	5
Romania	4
China	3
Iceland	3
Lithuania	3
Mexico	3
New Zealand	3
South Korea	3
Turkey	3
Algeria	2
Chile	2
Colombia	2
East Timor	2
Iran	2
Greece	2
Guatemala	2
Liberia	2
Luxembourg	2
Pakistan	2
Portugal	2
Saint Lucia	2
Tunisia	2
Venezuela	2
Azerbaijan	1
Bangladesh	1
Brazil	1
Bulgaria	1
Costa Rica	1
Democratic Republic of the Congo	1
Cyprus	1
Ethiopia	1
Faroe Islands	1
Ghana	1
Hong Kong	1
Iraq	1
Jordan	1
Kenya	1
Latvia	1
Lebanon	1
North Macedonia	1
Morocco	1
Myanmar	1
Nigeria	1
Palestine	1
Peru	1
Philippines	1
Saudi Arabia	1
Tanzania	1
Tibet	1
Trinidad and Tobago	1
Vietnam	1
Yemen	1
Yugoslavia	1
Zimbabwe	1

== Nobel Prizes by category/country of birth ==
Bar plot of Nobel Prize numbers by category / country of birth

Bar plot of Nobel Prize numbers by category - country of death

=== Algeria ===
1. Claude Cohen-Tannoudji*, Physics, 1997
2. Albert Camus*, Literature, 1957

=== Argentina ===
1. César Milstein*, Physiology or Medicine, 1984
2. Adolfo Pérez Esquivel, Peace, 1980
3. Luis Federico Leloir, born in France, Chemistry, 1970
4. Bernardo Houssay, Physiology or Medicine, 1947
5. Carlos Saavedra Lamas, Peace, 1936

=== Australia ===
1. Richard Robson, born in the United Kingdom, Chemistry, 2025
2. Brian Schmidt, born in the United States, Physics, 2011
3. Elizabeth Blackburn*, Physiology or Medicine, 2009
4. Barry Marshall, Physiology or Medicine, 2005
5. J. Robin Warren, Physiology or Medicine, 2005
6. Peter C. Doherty, Physiology or Medicine, 1996
7. Rolf Zinkernagel, Physiology or Medicine, 1996
8. John Cornforth*, Chemistry, 1975
9. Patrick White, born in the United Kingdom, Literature, 1973
10. Aleksandr M. Prokhorov, Physics, 1964
11. John Carew Eccles, Physiology or Medicine, 1963
12. Sir Frank Macfarlane Burnet, Physiology or Medicine, 1960
13. Howard Florey, Physiology or Medicine, 1945
14. William Lawrence Bragg, Physics, 1915
15. William Henry Bragg, Physics, 1915

=== Austria ===
1. Anton Zeilinger, Physics, 2022
2. Peter Handke, Literature, 2019
3. Martin Karplus*, Chemistry, 2013
4. Elfriede Jelinek, Literature, 2004
5. Eric Kandel*, Physiology or Medicine, 2000
6. Walter Kohn*, Chemistry, 1998
7. Friedrich Hayek, Economics, 1974
8. Konrad Lorenz, Physiology or Medicine, 1973
9. Karl von Frisch*, Physiology or Medicine, 1973
10. Max Perutz, Chemistry, 1962
11. Ivo Andrić*, born in the Dolac, Austria-Hungary (modern-day Bosnia and Herzegovina), Literature, 1961
12. Carl Ferdinand Cori, born in Austria, Physiology or Medicine, 1947
13. Gerty Cori, born in Austria, Physiology or Medicine, 1947
14. Wolfgang Pauli, Physics, 1945
15. Isidor Rabi, Polish-Jewish Orthodox, born in Rymanów, Galicia, Austria in Austro-Hungarian Empire, Physics, 1944
16. Richard Kuhn*, Chemistry, 1938
17. Otto Loewi, born in Germany, Physiology or Medicine, 1936
18. Victor Francis Hess, Physics, 1936
19. Erwin Schrödinger, Physics, 1933
20. Karl Landsteiner, Physiology or Medicine, 1930
21. Julius Wagner-Jauregg, Physiology or Medicine, 1927
22. Fritz Pregl*, born in Laibach, Austria-Hungary (modern-day Ljubljana, Slovenia), Chemistry, affiliation: Graz University, 1923
23. Róbert Bárány, born in Austria, Physiology or Medicine, 1914
24. Alfred Hermann Fried, Peace, 1911
25. Bertha von Suttner, born in the Austrian Empire, now Czech Republic, Peace, 1905

=== Azerbaijan ===
1. Lev Landau, born in Baku Governorate (Russian Empire), now Azerbaijan, Physics, 1962

=== Bangladesh ===
1. Muhammad Yunus, Peace, 2006

=== Belarus ===
1. Ales Bialiatski, Peace, 2022
2. Svetlana Alexievich, born in Ukraine, then a part of Soviet Union, Literature, 2015
3. Zhores Alferov*, born in Belarus, then a part of Soviet Union, Physics, 2000
4. Shimon Peres*, as an Israeli citizen (born in Belarus, then a part of Poland), Peace, 1994
5. Menachem Begin*, as an Israeli citizen (born in Belarus, then a part of Russian Empire), Peace, 1978
6. Simon Kuznets*, born in Belarus, then a part of Russian Empire, Economics, 1971

=== Belgium ===
1. Francis Halzen, Physics, 2026
2. François Englert, Physics, 2013
3. Ilya Prigogine, born in Russia, Chemistry, 1977
4. Christian de Duve, born in the United Kingdom, Physiology or Medicine, 1974
5. Albert Claude, Physiology or Medicine, 1974
6. Dominique Pire, Peace, 1958
7. Corneille Heymans, Physiology or Medicine, 1938
8. Jules Bordet, Physiology or Medicine, 1919
9. Henri La Fontaine, Peace, 1913
10. Maurice Maeterlinck, Literature, 1911
11. Auguste Beernaert, Peace, 1909
12. Institut de Droit International, Peace, 1904

=== Brazil ===
1. Peter Medawar*, Physiology or Medicine, 1960

=== Bulgaria ===
1. Elias Canetti*, Literature, 1981

=== Canada ===
1. Anne Carson, Literature, 2026
2. Peter Howitt, Economics, 2025
3. Geoffrey Hinton, born in the United Kingdom, Physics, 2024
4. David Card, Economics, 2021
5. Jim Peebles, Physics, 2019
6. Donna Strickland, Physics, 2018
7. Arthur B. McDonald, Physics, 2015
8. Alice Munro, Literature, 2013
9. Ralph M. Steinman, Physiology or Medicine, 2011
10. Willard S. Boyle, Physics, 2009
11. Jack W. Szostak, born in the United Kingdom, Physiology or Medicine, 2009
12. Robert Mundell, Economics, 1999
13. Myron Scholes*, Economics, 1997
14. William Vickrey*, Economics, 1996
15. Pugwash Conferences on Science and World Affairs, Peace, 1995
16. Bertram Brockhouse, Physics, 1994
17. Michael Smith, born in the United Kingdom, Chemistry, 1993
18. Rudolph A. Marcus*, Chemistry, 1992
19. Richard E. Taylor, Physics, 1990
20. Sidney Altman*, Chemistry, 1989
21. John Polanyi, born in Germany, Chemistry, 1986
22. Henry Taube*, Chemistry, 1983
23. David H. Hubel*, Physiology or Medicine, 1981
24. Saul Bellow*, Literature, 1976
25. Gerhard Herzberg, born in Germany, Chemistry, 1971
26. Charles B. Huggins*, Physiology or Medicine, 1966
27. Lester B. Pearson, Peace, 1957
28. William Giauque*, Chemistry, 1949
29. Frederick Banting, Physiology or Medicine, 1923
30. John Macleod, born in the United Kingdom of Great Britain and Ireland, Physiology or Medicine, 1923

=== Chile ===
1. Pablo Neruda, Literature, 1971
2. Gabriela Mistral, Literature, 1945

=== China, People's Republic of ===
1. Tu Youyou, Physiology or Medicine, 2015
2. Mo Yan, Literature, 2012
3. Liu Xiaobo, Peace, 2010

=== China, Republic of ===
1. Tu Youyou, Physiology or Medicine, 2015
2. Charles K. Kao*, Physics, 2009
3. Gao Xingjian*, Literature, 2000
4. Daniel C. Tsui*, Physics, 1998
5. Chen-Ning Yang*, Physics, 1957
6. Tsung-Dao Lee*, Physics, 1957

=== Colombia ===
1. Juan Manuel Santos Calderón, Peace, 2016
2. Gabriel García Márquez, Literature, 1982

=== Congo, Democratic Republic ===
1. Denis Mukwege, Peace, 2018

=== Costa Rica ===
1. Óscar Arias Sánchez, Peace, 1987

=== Cyprus ===
1. Christopher A. Pissarides*, Economics, 2010

=== Czechia ===
1. Peter Grünberg*, born in the Protectorate of Bohemia and Moravia, (now Czech Republic), Physics, 2007
2. Jaroslav Seifert, born in Prague, Austria-Hungary, (now Czech Republic), Literature, 1984
3. Jaroslav Heyrovský, born in Prague, Austria-Hungary, (now Czech Republic), Chemistry, 1959
4. Carl Ferdinand Cori*, born in Prague, Austria-Hungary, (now Czech Republic), Physiology or Medicine, 1947
5. Gerty Cori*, born in Prague, Austria-Hungary, (now Czech Republic), Physiology or Medicine, 1947
6. Bertha von Suttner*, born in Prague, Austria-Hungary, (now Czech Republic), Peace, 1905

=== Denmark ===
1. Morten P. Meldal, Chemistry, 2022
2. Jens Christian Skou, Chemistry, 1997
3. Niels Kaj Jerne, born in United Kingdom, Physiology or Medicine, 1984
4. Aage Bohr, Physics, 1975
5. Ben Roy Mottelson, born in United States, Physics, 1975
6. Johannes V. Jensen, Literature, 1944
7. Henrik Dam, Physiology or Medicine, 1943
8. Johannes Fibiger, Physiology or Medicine, 1926
9. Niels Bohr, Physics, 1922
10. August Krogh, Physiology or Medicine, 1920
11. Karl Adolph Gjellerup, Literature, 1917
12. Henrik Pontoppidan, Literature, 1917
13. Fredrik Bajer, Peace, 1908
14. Niels Ryberg Finsen, born in Faroe Islands, Physiology or Medicine, 1903

=== East Timor ===
1. Carlos Filipe Ximenes Belo, Peace, 1996
2. José Ramos-Horta, Peace, 1996

=== Egypt ===
1. Mohamed ElBaradei, Peace, 2005
2. Ahmed Zewail, Egyptian-American dual-national born in Egypt, Chemistry, 1999
3. Yasser Arafat, Palestinian national born in Egypt, Peace, 1994
4. Naguib Mahfouz, Literature, 1988
5. Anwar Sadat, Peace, 1978
6. Dorothy Crowfoot Hodgkin, British national born in Egypt, Chemistry, 1964

=== Ethiopia ===
1. Abiy Ahmed Ali, Peace, 2019

=== Faroe Islands ===
1. Niels Ryberg Finsen*, Physiology or Medicine, 1903

=== Finland ===
1. Bengt R. Holmström, Economics, 2016
2. Martti Ahtisaari, Peace, 2008
3. Ragnar Granit, born in the Grand Duchy of Finland, a part of the Russian Empire in 1809–1917, Physiology or Medicine, 1967
4. Artturi Ilmari Virtanen, born in the Grand Duchy of Finland, a part of the Russian Empire in 1809–1917, Chemistry, 1945
5. Frans Eemil Sillanpää, born in the Grand Duchy of Finland, a part of the Russian Empire in 1809–1917, Literature, 1939

=== France ===
1. Henri Kagan, Chemistry, 2026
2. Philippe Aghion, Economics, 2025
3. Michel Devoret, Physics, 2025
4. Moungi Bawendi, Chemistry, 2023
5. Pierre Agostini, born in Tunisia, Physics, 2023
6. Anne L'Huillier, Physics, 2023
7. Annie Ernaux, Literature, 2022
8. Alain Aspect, Physics, 2022
9. Emmanuelle Charpentier, Chemistry, 2020
10. Esther Duflo, Economics, 2019
11. Gérard Mourou, Physics, 2018
12. Jean-Pierre Sauvage, Chemistry, 2016
13. Jean Tirole, Economics, 2014
14. Patrick Modiano, Literature, 2014
15. Serge Haroche, born in Morocco, then under French protectorate, Physics, 2012
16. Jules A. Hoffmann, born in Luxembourg, Physiology or Medicine, 2011
17. J. M. G. Le Clézio, Literature, 2008
18. Luc Montagnier, Physiology or Medicine, 2008
19. Françoise Barré-Sinoussi, Physiology or Medicine, 2008
20. Albert Fert, Physics, 2007
21. Yves Chauvin, Chemistry, 2005
22. Gao Xingjian, born in China, Literature, 2000
23. Médecins Sans Frontières, Peace, 1999
24. Claude Cohen-Tannoudji, born in French Algeria, Physics, 1997
25. Georges Charpak, born in then Poland (Second Polish Republic), now Ukraine, Physics, 1992
26. Pierre-Gilles de Gennes, Physics, 1991
27. Maurice Allais, Economics, 1988
28. Jean-Marie Lehn, Chemistry, 1987
29. Claude Simon, Literature, 1985
30. Gérard Debreu, Economics, 1983
31. Jean Dausset, Physiology or Medicine, 1980
32. Roger Guillemin*, Physiology or Medicine, 1977
33. Seán MacBride*, Peace, 1974
34. Louis Néel, Physics, 1970
35. Luis Federico Leloir*, Chemistry, 1970
36. René Cassin, Peace, 1968
37. Alfred Kastler, Physics, 1966
38. François Jacob, Physiology or Medicine, 1965
39. Jacques Monod, Physiology or Medicine, 1965
40. André Lwoff, Physiology or Medicine, 1965
41. Jean-Paul Sartre, Literature, 1964 (declined the prize)
42. Saint-John Perse, Literature, 1960
43. Albert Camus, born in French Algeria, Literature, 1957
44. André Frédéric Cournand, Physiology or Medicine, 1956
45. François Mauriac, Literature, 1952
46. Albert Schweitzer, born in Alsace, then in Germany, Peace, 1952
47. Léon Jouhaux, Peace, 1951
48. André Gide, Literature, 1947
49. Roger Martin du Gard, Literature, 1937
50. Frédéric Joliot-Curie, Chemistry, 1935
51. Irène Joliot-Curie, Chemistry, 1935
52. Ivan Bunin, born in Russia, Literature, 1933
53. Louis de Broglie, Physics, 1929
54. Charles Nicolle, Physiology or Medicine, 1928
55. Henri Bergson, Literature, 1927
56. Ferdinand Buisson, Peace, 1927
57. Aristide Briand, Peace, 1926
58. Jean Baptiste Perrin, Physics, 1926
59. Anatole France, Literature, 1921
60. Léon Bourgeois, Peace, 1920
61. Romain Rolland, Literature, 1915
62. Alfred Werner*, Chemistry, 1913
63. Charles Richet, Physiology or Medicine, 1913
64. Alexis Carrel, Physiology or Medicine, 1912
65. Paul Sabatier, Chemistry, 1912
66. Victor Grignard, Chemistry, 1912
67. Marie Curie, born in Congress Poland (Russian Empire), Chemistry, 1911
68. Paul-Henri-Benjamin d'Estournelles de Constant, Peace, 1909
69. Gabriel Lippmann, born in Luxembourg, Physics, 1908
70. Charles Louis Alphonse Laveran, Physiology or Medicine, 1907
71. Louis Renault, Peace, 1907
72. Henri Moissan, Chemistry, 1906
73. Frédéric Mistral, Literature, 1904
74. Antoine Henri Becquerel, Physics, 1903
75. Pierre Curie, Physics, 1903
76. Marie Curie, born in Congress Poland, (Russian Empire), Physics, 1903
77. Henry Dunant, born in the Swiss Confederation, Peace, 1901
78. Frédéric Passy, Peace, 1901
79. Sully Prudhomme, Literature, 1901

=== Germany ===
1. Peter Hegemann, Physiology or Medicine, 2026
2. Georg Nagel, Physiology or Medicine, 2026
3. Benjamin List, Chemistry, 2021
4. Klaus Hasselmann, Physics, 2021
5. Reinhard Genzel, Physics, 2020
6. John B. Goodenough*, Chemistry, 2019
7. Joachim Frank*, Chemistry, 2017
8. Rainer Weiss*, Physics, 2017
9. Stefan Hell, born in Romania, Chemistry, 2014
10. Thomas C. Südhof, Physiology or Medicine, 2013
11. Herta Müller, born in Romania, Literature, 2009
12. Harald zur Hausen, Physiology or Medicine, 2008
13. Gerhard Ertl, Chemistry, 2007
14. Peter Grünberg, born in the Protectorate of Bohemia and Moravia, now the Czech Republic, Physics, 2007
15. Theodor W. Hänsch, Physics, 2005
16. Wolfgang Ketterle, Physics, 2001
17. Herbert Kroemer, Physics, 2000
18. Günter Blobel*, Physiology or Medicine, 1999
19. Günter Grass, born in Free City of Danzig, now Poland, Literature, 1999
20. Horst L. Störmer, Physics, 1998
21. Paul J. Crutzen, Chemistry, 1995
22. Christiane Nüsslein-Volhard, Physiology or Medicine, 1995
23. Reinhard Selten, Economics, 1994
24. Bert Sakmann, Physiology or Medicine, 1991
25. Erwin Neher, Physiology or Medicine, 1991
26. Hans G. Dehmelt*, Physics, 1989
27. Wolfgang Paul, Physics, 1989
28. Johann Deisenhofer, Chemistry, 1988
29. Robert Huber, Chemistry, 1988
30. Hartmut Michel, Chemistry, 1988
31. Jack Steinberger*, Physics, 1988
32. J. Georg Bednorz, Physics, 1987
33. John Polanyi*, Chemistry, 1986
34. Ernst Ruska, Physics, 1986
35. Gerd Binnig, Physics, 1986
36. Klaus von Klitzing, Physics, 1985
37. Georges J.F. Köhler*, Physiology or Medicine, 1984
38. Georg Wittig, Chemistry, 1979
39. Arno Penzias*, Physics, 1978
40. Henry Kissinger*, Peace, 1978
41. Ernst Otto Fischer, Chemistry, 1973
42. Karl von Frisch, born in Austria-Hungary, now Austria, Physiology or Medicine, 1973
43. Wassily Leontief*, Economics,1973
44. Heinrich Böll, Literature, 1972
45. Gerhard Herzberg*, Chemistry, 1971
46. Willy Brandt, Peace, 1971
47. Bernard Katz*, Physiology or Medicine, 1970
48. Max Delbrück*, Physiology or Medicine, 1969
49. Manfred Eigen, Chemistry, 1967
50. Hans Bethe*, Physics, 1967
51. Nelly Sachs*, Literature, 1966
52. Feodor Felix Konrad Lynen, Physiology or Medicine, 1964
53. Konrad Bloch*, Physiology or Medicine, 1964
54. Karl Ziegler, Chemistry, 1963
55. Maria Goeppert-Mayer*, Physics, 1963
56. J. Hans D. Jensen, Physics, 1963
57. Rudolf Mössbauer, Physics, 1961
58. Werner Forssmann, Physiology or Medicine, 1956
59. Polykarp Kusch*, Physics, 1955
60. Max Born*, Physics, 1954
61. Walther Bothe, Physics, 1954
62. Hermann Staudinger, Chemistry, 1953
63. Fritz Albert Lipmann*, Physiology or Medicine, 1953
64. Hans Adolf Krebs*, Physiology or Medicine, 1953
65. Albert Schweitzer*, Peace, 1952
66. Otto Diels, Chemistry, 1950
67. Kurt Alder, Chemistry, 1950
68. Hermann Hesse*, Literature, 1946
69. Ernst Boris Chain*, Physiology or Medicine, 1945
70. Otto Hahn, Chemistry, 1944
71. Otto Stern*, Physics, 1943
72. Adolf Butenandt, Chemistry, 1939
73. Gerhard Domagk, Physiology or Medicine, 1939
74. Richard Kuhn, born in Austria-Hungary, now Austria, Chemistry, 1938
75. Otto Loewi*, Physiology or Medicine, 1936
76. Carl von Ossietzky, Peace, 1935
77. Hans Spemann, Physiology or Medicine, 1935
78. Werner Karl Heisenberg, Physics, 1932
79. Otto Heinrich Warburg, Physiology or Medicine, 1931
80. Carl Bosch, Chemistry, 1931
81. Friedrich Bergius, Chemistry, 1931
82. Hans Fischer, Chemistry, 1930
83. Thomas Mann, Literature, 1929
84. Hans von Euler-Chelpin*, Chemistry, 1929
85. Adolf Otto Reinhold Windaus, Chemistry, 1928
86. Ludwig Quidde, Peace, 1927
87. Heinrich Otto Wieland, Chemistry, 1927
88. Gustav Stresemann, Peace, 1926
89. James Franck, Physics, 1925
90. Gustav Ludwig Hertz, Physics, 1925
91. Otto Fritz Meyerhof, Physiology or Medicine, 1922
92. Albert Einstein, Physics, 1921
93. Walther Nernst, Chemistry, 1920
94. Johannes Stark, Physics, 1919
95. Fritz Haber, Chemistry, 1918
96. Max Karl Ernst Ludwig Planck, Physics, 1918
97. Richard Willstätter, Chemistry, 1915
98. Max von Laue, Physics, 1914
99. Gerhart Hauptmann, born in Prussia, now Poland, Literature, 1912
100. Wilhelm Wien, Physics, 1911
101. Otto Wallach, Chemistry, 1910
102. Albrecht Kossel, Physiology or Medicine, 1910
103. Paul Johann Ludwig Heyse, Literature, 1910
104. Karl Ferdinand Braun, Physics, 1909
105. Wilhelm Ostwald, born in Russia, now Latvia, Chemistry, 1909
106. Rudolf Christoph Eucken, Literature, 1908
107. Paul Ehrlich, Physiology or Medicine, 1908
108. Élie Metchnikoff, born in Ukraine, then a part of Russian Empire, Physiology or Medicine, 1908
109. Eduard Buchner, Chemistry, 1907
110. Robert Koch, Physiology or Medicine, 1905
111. Philipp Lenard, born in Pressburg, Kingdom of Hungary, Austrian Empire, now Slovakia, Physics, 1905
112. Adolf von Baeyer, Chemistry, 1905
113. Hermann Emil Fischer, Chemistry, 1902
114. Theodor Mommsen, born in Duchy of Schleswig, Literature, 1902
115. Emil Adolf von Behring, Physiology or Medicine, 1901
116. Wilhelm Conrad Röntgen, Physics, 1901

=== Ghana ===
1. Kofi Annan, Peace, 2001

=== Greece ===
1. Odysseas Elytis, Literature, 1979
2. Giorgos Seferis, born in then Ottoman Empire, now Turkey, Literature, 1963

=== Guatemala ===
1. Rigoberta Menchú, Peace, 1992
2. Miguel Ángel Asturias, Literature, 1967

=== Hungary ===
1. László Krasznahorkai, Literature, 2025
2. Ferenc Krausz, Physics, 2023
3. Katalin Karikó, Physiology or Medicine, 2023
4. Ferenc Herskó*, as an Israeli citizen, Chemistry, 2004
5. Imre Kertész, Literature, 2002
6. György András Oláh, Chemistry, 1994
7. János Harsányi, Economics, 1994
8. János Polányi, born in Germany, Chemistry, 1986
9. Dénes Gábor, Physics, 1971
10. Jenő Pál Wigner, Physics, 1963
11. György Békésy, Physiology or Medicine, 1961
12. György Hevesy, Chemistry, 1943
13. Albert Szent-Györgyi, Physiology or Medicine, 1937
14. Richárd Zsigmondy, Chemistry, 1925
15. Róbert Bárány, born in Austria, Physiology or Medicine, 1914
16. Fülöp Lénárd, Physics, 1905

=== Iceland ===
1. Niels Finsen, Physiology or Medicine, 1903
2. Halldór Laxness, Literature, 1955
3. Anne Carson, Literature, 2026

=== India ===
1. Navi Pillay*, Peace, 2026
2. Abhijit Banerjee*, Economics, 2019
3. Kailash Satyarthi, Peace, 2014
4. Venkatraman Ramakrishnan*, Chemistry, 2009
5. Amartya Sen, Economics, 1998
6. 14th Dalai Lama, born in Taktser, China, Peace, 1989
7. Subramanyan Chandrasekhar*, Physics, 1983
8. Mother Teresa, born in North Macedonia, Peace, 1979
9. Har Gobind Khorana*, Physiology or Medicine, 1968
10. C. V. Raman, Physics, 1930
11. Rabindranath Tagore, Literature, 1913
12. Rudyard Kipling, Literature, 1907
13. Ronald Ross, Physiology or Medicine, 1902

=== Iran ===
1. Narges Mohammadi, Peace, 2023
2. Shirin Ebadi, Peace, 2003

=== Iraq ===
1. Nadia Murad, Peace, 2018

=== Ireland ===
1. William C. Campbell, Physiology or Medicine, 2015
2. John Hume, Peace, 1998
3. David Trimble, Peace, 1998
4. Séamus Heaney, Literature, 1995
5. Mairead Corrigan, Peace, 1976
6. Betty Williams, Peace, 1976
7. Seán MacBride, born in France, Peace, 1974
8. Samuel Beckett, Literature, 1969
9. Ernest Walton, Physics, 1951
10. George Bernard Shaw*, Literature, 1925
11. W. B. Yeats, Literature, 1923

=== Israel ===
1. Joel Mokyr, born in the Netherlands, Economics, 2025
2. Joshua Angrist, born in the United States, Economics, 2021
3. Arieh Warshel, Chemistry, 2013
4. Michael Levitt, born in South Africa, Chemistry, 2013
5. Dan Shechtman, Chemistry, 2011
6. Ada Yonath, Chemistry, 2009
7. Robert Aumann, born in Germany, moved to Israel from the United States, Economics, 2005
8. Aaron Ciechanover, Chemistry, 2004
9. Avram Hershko, born in Hungary, Chemistry, 2004
10. Daniel Kahneman*, Economics, 2002
11. Yitzhak Rabin, Peace, 1994
12. Shimon Peres, born in Poland, now Belarus, Peace, 1994
13. Menachem Begin, born in Russia, now Belarus, Peace, 1978
14. Shmuel Yosef Agnon, born in Austria-Hungary, now Ukraine, Literature, 1966

=== Italy ===
1. Giorgio Parisi, Physics, 2021
2. Mario R. Capecchi*, Physiology or Medicine, 2007
3. Riccardo Giacconi*, Physics, 2002
4. Dario Fo, Literature, 1997
5. Rita Levi-Montalcini, Physiology or Medicine, 1986
6. Franco Modigliani*, Economics, 1985
7. Carlo Rubbia, Physics, 1984
8. Eugenio Montale, Literature, 1975
9. Renato Dulbecco*, Physiology or Medicine, 1975
10. Salvador Luria*, Physiology or Medicine, 1969
11. Giulio Natta, Chemistry, 1963
12. Emilio Segrè*, Physics, 1959
13. Salvatore Quasimodo, Literature, 1959
14. Daniel Bovet, born in Switzerland, Physiology or Medicine, 1957
15. Enrico Fermi, Physics, 1938
16. Luigi Pirandello, Literature, 1934
17. Grazia Deledda, Literature, 1926
18. Guglielmo Marconi, Physics, 1909
19. Ernesto Teodoro Moneta, Peace, 1907
20. Camillo Golgi, Physiology or Medicine, 1906
21. Giosuè Carducci, Literature, 1906

=== Japan ===
1. Kensō Soai, Chemistry, 2026
2. Susumu Kitagawa, Chemistry, 2025
3. Shimon Sakaguchi, Physiology or Medicine, 2025
4. Nihon Hidankyo*, Peace, 2024
5. Syukuro Manabe*, Physics, 2021
6. Akira Yoshino, Chemistry, 2019
7. Tasuku Honjo, Physiology or Medicine, 2018
8. Kazuo Ishiguro*, Literature, 2017
9. Yoshinori Ohsumi, Physiology or Medicine, 2016
10. Takaaki Kajita, Physics, 2015
11. Satoshi Ōmura, Physiology or Medicine, 2015
12. Shuji Nakamura*, Physics, 2014
13. Hiroshi Amano, Physics, 2014
14. Isamu Akasaki, Physics, 2014
15. Shinya Yamanaka, Physiology or Medicine, 2012
16. Akira Suzuki, Chemistry, 2010
17. Ei-ichi Negishi, Born in China, Chemistry, 2010
18. Osamu Shimomura, Chemistry, 2008
19. Toshihide Maskawa, Physics, 2008
20. Makoto Kobayashi, Physics, 2008
21. Yoichiro Nambu*, Physics, 2008
22. Koichi Tanaka, Chemistry, 2002
23. Masatoshi Koshiba, Physics, 2002
24. Ryōji Noyori, Chemistry, 2001
25. Hideki Shirakawa, Chemistry, 2000
26. Kenzaburō Ōe, Literature, 1994
27. Susumu Tonegawa, Physiology or Medicine, 1987
28. Yuan T. Lee*, Chemistry, 1986
29. Kenichi Fukui, Chemistry, 1981
30. Eisaku Satō, Peace, 1974
31. Leo Esaki, Physics, 1973
32. Yasunari Kawabata, Literature, 1968
33. Shin'ichiro Tomonaga, Physics, 1965
34. Hideki Yukawa, Physics, 1949

=== Jordan ===
1. Omar M. Yaghi, Chemistry, 2025

=== Kenya ===
1. Wangari Maathai, Peace, 2004

=== Lebanon ===
1. Ardem Patapoutian*, Physiology or Medicine, 2021

=== Latvia ===
1. Wilhelm Ostwald*, Chemistry, 1909

=== Liberia ===
1. Ellen Johnson Sirleaf, Peace, 2011
2. Leymah Gbowee, Peace, 2011

=== Lithuania ===
1. Aaron Klug*, Chemistry, 1982
2. Czesław Miłosz*, Literature, 1980
3. Andrew Schally*, Physiology or Medicine, 1977

=== Luxembourg ===
1. Jules A. Hoffmann*, Physiology or Medicine, 2011
2. Gabriel Lippmann*, Physics, 1908

=== Mexico ===
1. Mario José Molina Henríquez*, Chemistry, 1995
2. Octavio Paz Lozano, Literature, 1990
3. Alfonso García Robles, Peace, 1982

=== Myanmar (Burma) ===
1. Aung San Suu Kyi, Peace, 1991

=== Morocco ===
1. Serge Haroche*, Physics, 2012; a French citizen as per his Wikipedia page

=== Netherlands ===
1. Joel Mokyr*, Economics, 2025; American-Israeli economist, born in the Netherlands
2. Guido Imbens, Economics, 2021
3. Ben Feringa, Chemistry, 2016
4. Organisation for the Prohibition of Chemical Weapons, Peace, 2013
5. Martinus J. G. Veltman, Physics, 1999
6. Gerard 't Hooft, Physics, 1999
7. Paul J. Crutzen, Chemistry, 1995
8. Simon van der Meer, Physics, 1984
9. Nicolaas Bloembergen*, Physics, 1981
10. Tjalling C. Koopmans, Economics, 1975
11. Nikolaas Tinbergen*, Physiology or Medicine, 1973
12. Jan Tinbergen, Economics, 1969
13. Frits Zernike, Physics, 1953
14. Peter Debye, Chemistry, 1936
15. Christiaan Eijkman, Physiology or Medicine, 1929
16. Willem Einthoven, Physiology or Medicine, 1924
17. Heike Kamerlingh Onnes, Physics, 1913
18. Tobias Asser, Peace, 1911
19. Johannes Diderik van der Waals, Physics, 1910
20. Pieter Zeeman, Physics, 1902
21. Hendrik Lorentz, Physics, 1902
22. Jacobus Henricus van 't Hoff, Chemistry, 1901

=== New Zealand ===
1. Alan MacDiarmid, Chemistry, 2000
2. Maurice Wilkins, Physiology or Medicine, 1962
3. Ernest Rutherford*, Chemistry, 1908

=== Nigeria ===
1. Wole Soyinka, Literature, 1986

=== North Macedonia ===
1. Mother Teresa*, born in then Ottoman Empire, now North Macedonia, Peace, 1979

=== Norway ===
1. Jon Fosse, Literature, 2023
2. May-Britt Moser, Physiology or Medicine, 2014
3. Edvard Moser, Physiology or Medicine, 2014
4. Finn E. Kydland, Economics, 2004
5. Trygve Haavelmo, Economics, 1989
6. Ivar Giaever, Physics, 1973
7. Ragnar Frisch, Economics, 1969
8. Odd Hassel, Chemistry, 1969
9. Lars Onsager, Chemistry, 1968
10. Sigrid Undset, Literature, 1928
11. Fridtjof Nansen, Peace, 1922
12. Christian Lous Lange, Peace, 1921
13. Knut Hamsun, Literature, 1920
14. Bjørnstjerne Bjørnson, Literature, 1903

=== Pakistan ===
1. Malala Yousafzai, Peace, 2014
2. Abdus Salam, Physics, 1979

=== Palestine ===
1. Yasser Arafat, Born in Cairo, Egypt, Peace, 1994

=== Peru ===
1. Mario Vargas Llosa*, Literature, 2010

=== Philippines ===
1. Maria Ressa, Peace, 2021

=== Poland ===
1. Victor Ambros, Physiology or Medicine, 2024
2. Olga Tokarczuk, Literature, 2018
3. Leonid Hurwicz*, born in then Russian Republic (now Russia), Economics, 2007
4. Wisława Szymborska, Literature, 1996
5. Joseph Rotblat*, born in Congress Poland (Russian Empire), Peace, 1995
6. Shimon Peres*, as an Israeli citizen, Peace, 1994
7. Georges Charpak*, born in Dąbrowica Poland (now in Ukraine), Physics, 1992
8. Lech Wałęsa, born in Popowo, Reichsgau Danzig-West Prussia, Germany (today Poland), Peace, 1983
9. Roald Hoffmann*, born in Złoczów Poland (now in Ukraine), Chemistry, 1981
10. Czesław Miłosz*, born in Russian Empire, now Lithuania, Literature, 1980
11. Isaac Bashevis Singer*, born in Congress Poland (Russian Empire), Literature, 1978
12. Menachem Begin*, as an Israeli citizen, he also had Polish citizenship, Peace, 1978
13. Andrew Schally*, born in Vilnius, Poland (now Vilnius, Lithuania), Physiology or Medicine, 1977
14. Tadeusz Reichstein*, born in Congress Poland (Russian Empire), Physiology or Medicine, 1950
15. Isidor Isaac Rabi*, born in Rymanów, Austria-Hungary (now in Poland), Physics, 1944
16. Władysław Reymont, born in Congress Poland (Russian Empire), Literature, 1924
17. Marie Skłodowska-Curie, born in Congress Poland (Russian Empire), Chemistry, 1911
18. Albert A. Michelson*, born in Strelno, Kingdom of Prussia (now in Poland), Physics, 1907
19. Henryk Sienkiewicz, born in Congress Poland (Russian Empire), Literature, 1905
20. Marie Skłodowska-Curie, born in Congress Poland (Russian Empire), Physics, 1903

=== Portugal ===
1. José Saramago, Literature, 1998
2. António Egas Moniz, Physiology or Medicine, 1949

=== Romania ===
1. Stefan Hell*, Chemistry, 2014
2. Herta Müller*, Literature, 2009
3. Elie Wiesel*, Peace, 1986
4. George E. Palade*, Physiology or Medicine, 1974

=== Russia and Soviet Union ===
1. Alexei Ekimov, Chemistry, 2023
2. Memorial, Peace, 2022
3. Dmitry Muratov, Peace, 2021
4. Andre Geim*, Physics, 2010
5. Konstantin Novoselov*, Physics, 2010
6. Leonid Hurwicz*, Economics, 2007
7. Alexei Alexeyevich Abrikosov*, Physics, 2003
8. Vitaly Ginzburg, Physics, 2003
9. Zhores Alferov, born in then Soviet Union, now Belarus, Physics, 2000
10. Mikhail Gorbachev, Peace, 1990
11. Joseph Brodsky, born in Russia, Literature, 1987
12. Pyotr Kapitsa, Physics, 1978
13. Menachem Begin*, as an Israeli citizen, Peace, 1978
14. Ilya Prigogine*, Chemistry, 1977
15. Andrei Sakharov, Peace, 1975
16. Leonid Kantorovich, Economics, 1975
17. Simon Kuznets, now Belarus, Economics, 1971
18. Aleksandr Solzhenitsyn, Literature, 1970
19. Mikhail Sholokhov, Literature, 1965
20. Nikolay Basov, Physics, 1964
21. Alexander Prokhorov, born in Australia, Physics, 1964
22. Lev Landau, born in then Russian Empire, now Azerbaijan, laureate when citizen of the Soviet Union, Physics, 1962
23. Boris Pasternak, Literature, 1958 (forced to decline)
24. Pavel Cherenkov, Physics, 1958
25. Igor Tamm, Physics, 1958
26. Ilya Mikhailovich Frank, Physics, 1958
27. Nikolay Semyonov, Chemistry, 1956
28. Ivan Bunin*, Literature, 1933
29. Élie Metchnikoff, born in then Russian Empire now Ukraine, Physiology or Medicine, 1908
30. Ivan Pavlov, Physiology or Medicine, 1904

=== Saint Lucia ===
1. Derek Walcott, Literature, 1992
2. W. Arthur Lewis*, Economics, 1979

=== Saudi Arabia ===
1. Omar M. Yaghi, born in Jordan, Chemistry, 2025

=== South Africa ===
1. Navi Pillay*, Peace, 2026
2. Michael Levitt*, Chemistry, 2013
3. J. M. Coetzee, Literature, 2003
4. Sydney Brenner*, Physiology or Medicine, 2002
5. F. W. de Klerk, Peace, 1993
6. Nelson Mandela, Peace, 1993
7. Nadine Gordimer, Literature, 1991
8. Desmond Tutu, Peace, 1984
9. Aaron Klug*, Chemistry, 1982
10. Allan M. Cormack*, Physiology or Medicine, 1979
11. Albert Lutuli, born in then Rhodesia, now Zimbabwe, Peace, 1960
12. Max Theiler, Physiology or Medicine, 1951

=== South Korea ===
1. Han Kang, Literature, 2024
2. Kim Dae-jung, Peace, 2000
3. Charles J. Pedersen*, born in Busan, now South Korea, Chemistry, 1987

=== Spain ===
1. Mario Vargas Llosa, born in Peru, Literature, 2010
2. Camilo José Cela, Literature, 1989
3. Vicente Aleixandre, Literature, 1977
4. Severo Ochoa*, Physiology or Medicine, 1959
5. Juan Ramón Jiménez, Literature, 1956
6. Jacinto Benavente, Literature, 1922
7. Santiago Ramón y Cajal, Physiology or Medicine, 1906
8. José Echegaray, Literature, 1904

=== Sweden ===
1. Anne L'Huillier, born in France, Physics, 2023
2. Svante Pääbo, Physiology or Medicine, 2022
3. Tomas Lindahl, Chemistry, 2015
4. Tomas Tranströmer, Literature, 2011
5. Arvid Carlsson, Physiology or Medicine, 2000
6. Alva Myrdal, Peace, 1982
7. Sune Bergström, Physiology or Medicine, 1982
8. Bengt I. Samuelsson, Physiology or Medicine, 1982
9. Kai Siegbahn, Physics, 1981
10. Torsten Wiesel, Physiology or Medicine, 1981
11. Bertil Ohlin, Economics, 1977
12. Eyvind Johnson, Literature, 1974
13. Harry Martinson, Literature, 1974
14. Gunnar Myrdal, Economics, 1974
15. Ulf von Euler, Physiology or Medicine, 1970
16. Hannes Alfvén, Physics, 1970
17. Ragnar Granit, born in the Grand Duchy of Finland, then a part of Russia, Physiology or Medicine, 1967
18. Nelly Sachs, born in Germany, Literature, 1966
19. Dag Hammarskjöld, Peace, 1961 (posthumously)
20. Hugo Theorell, Physiology or Medicine, 1955
21. Pär Lagerkvist, Literature, 1951
22. Arne Tiselius, Chemistry, 1948
23. Erik Axel Karlfeldt, Literature, 1931 (posthumously)
24. Nathan Söderblom, Peace, 1930
25. Hans von Euler-Chelpin, born in Germany, Chemistry, 1929
26. Theodor Svedberg, Chemistry, 1926
27. Karl Manne Siegbahn, Physics, 1924
28. Hjalmar Branting, Peace, 1921
29. Carl Gustaf Verner von Heidenstam, Literature, 1916
30. Gustaf Dalén, Physics, 1912
31. Allvar Gullstrand, Physiology or Medicine, 1911
32. Selma Lagerlöf, Literature, 1909
33. Klas Pontus Arnoldson, Peace, 1908
34. Svante Arrhenius, Chemistry, 1903

=== Switzerland ===
1. Michel Mayor, Physics, 2019
2. Didier Queloz, Physics, 2019
3. Jacques Dubochet, Chemistry, 2017
4. Kurt Wüthrich, Chemistry, 2002
5. Rolf M. Zinkernagel, Physiology or Medicine, 1996
6. Edmond H. Fischer, Physiology or Medicine, 1992
7. Richard R. Ernst, Chemistry, 1991
8. Karl Alexander Müller, Physics, 1987
9. Heinrich Rohrer, Physics, 1986
10. Werner Arber, Physiology or Medicine, 1978
11. Vladimir Prelog*, born in Sarajevo, Austria-Hungary (modern-day Bosnia and Herzegovina), Chemistry, affiliation: ETH Zurich 1975
12. Daniel Bovet, Physiology or Medicine, 1957
13. Felix Bloch, Physics, 1952
14. Tadeusz Reichstein, Physiology or Medicine, 1950
15. Walter Rudolf Hess, Physiology or Medicine, 1949
16. Paul Hermann Müller, Physiology or Medicine, 1948
17. Hermann Hesse, born in Germany, Literature, 1946
18. Leopold Ružička*, born in Vukovar, Austria-Hungary (modern-day Croatia), Chemistry, affiliation: ETH Zurich, 1939
19. Paul Karrer, Chemistry, 1937
20. Albert Einstein, born in Germany, Physics, 1921
21. Charles Édouard Guillaume, Physics, 1920
22. Carl Spitteler, Literature, 1919
23. Alfred Werner, Chemistry, 1913
24. Theodor Kocher, Physiology or Medicine, 1909
25. Élie Ducommun, Peace, 1902
26. Charles Albert Gobat, Peace, 1902
27. Henry Dunant, Peace, 1901

=== Tanzania ===
1. Abdulrazak Gurnah*, Literature, 2021

=== Trinidad and Tobago ===
1. V. S. Naipaul*, Literature, 2001

=== Tunisia ===
1. Pierre Agostini*, Physics, 2023
2. Tunisian National Dialogue Quartet, Peace, 2015

=== Turkey ===
1. Daron Acemoglu, Economics, 2024
2. Aziz Sancar, Chemistry, 2015
3. Orhan Pamuk, Literature, 2006

=== Ukraine ===
1. Centre for Civil Liberties, Peace, 2022
2. Svetlana Alexievich*, born in Ukraine, then a part of Soviet Union, Literature, 2015
3. Georges Charpak*, born in Ukraine, then a part of Poland, Physics, 1992
4. Roald Hoffmann*, born in Ukraine, then a part of Poland, Chemistry, 1981
5. Shmuel Yosef Agnon*, born in Ukraine, then a part of Austria-Hungary, Literature, 1966
6. Selman Waksman*, born in Ukraine, then a part of Russian Empire, Physiology or Medicine, 1952
7. Élie Metchnikoff, born in Ukraine, then a part of Russian Empire, Physiology or Medicine, 1908

=== United Kingdom ===
1. Richard Robson, Chemistry, 2025
2. John Clarke, Physics, 2025
3. James A. Robinson, Economics, 2024
4. Simon Johnson, Economics, 2024
5. Geoffrey Hinton, Physics, 2024
6. Demis Hassabis, Chemistry, 2024
7. Abdulrazak Gurnah, born in Tanzania, Literature, 2021
8. David MacMillan, Chemistry, 2021
9. Roger Penrose, Physics, 2020
10. Michael Houghton, Physiology or Medicine, 2020
11. Peter J. Ratcliffe, Physiology or Medicine, 2019
12. M. Stanley Whittingham, Chemistry, 2019
13. Greg Winter, Chemistry, 2018
14. Kazuo Ishiguro, born in Japan, Literature, 2017
15. Richard Henderson, Chemistry, 2017
16. Oliver Hart, Economics, 2016
17. Fraser Stoddart, Chemistry, 2016
18. David J. Thouless, Physics, 2016
19. F. Duncan M. Haldane, Physics, 2016
20. John M. Kosterlitz, Physics, 2016
21. Angus Deaton, Economics, 2015
22. Tomas Lindahl, born in Sweden, Chemistry, 2015
23. John O'Keefe, born in the United States, Physiology or Medicine, 2014
24. Michael Levitt, born in South Africa, Chemistry, 2013
25. Peter Higgs, Physics, 2013
26. John Gurdon, Physiology or Medicine, 2012
27. Christopher A. Pissarides, born in Cyprus, Economics, 2010
28. Konstantin Novoselov, born in Russia, Physics, 2010
29. Robert G. Edwards, Physiology or Medicine, 2010
30. Charles K. Kao, Physics, 2009
31. Venkatraman Ramakrishnan, born in India, Chemistry, 2009
32. Jack W. Szostak, born in United Kingdom, Physiology or Medicine, 2009
33. Doris Lessing, born in Iran, Literature, 2007
34. Sir Martin J. Evans, Physiology or Medicine, 2007
35. Oliver Smithies*, Physiology or Medicine, 2007
36. Harold Pinter, Literature, 2005
37. Clive W. J. Granger, Economics, 2003
38. Anthony J. Leggett*, Physics, 2003
39. Peter Mansfield, Physiology or Medicine, 2003
40. Sydney Brenner, born in South Africa, Physiology or Medicine, 2002
41. John E. Sulston, Physiology or Medicine, 2002
42. Tim Hunt, Physiology or Medicine, 2001
43. Paul Nurse, Physiology or Medicine, 2001
44. V. S. Naipaul, born in Trinidad, Literature, 2001
45. David Trimble, Peace, 1998
46. John Pople, Chemistry, 1998
47. John E. Walker, Chemistry, 1997
48. Harold Kroto, Chemistry, 1996
49. James A. Mirrlees, Economics, 1996
50. Joseph Rotblat, born in then Russian Empire, now Poland, Peace, 1995
51. Richard J. Roberts, Physiology or Medicine, 1993
52. Michael Smith*, Chemistry, 1993
53. Ronald Coase, based in the United States, Economics, 1991
54. James W. Black, Physiology or Medicine, 1988
55. César Milstein, born in Argentina, Physiology or Medicine, 1984
56. Richard Stone, Economics, 1984
57. William Golding, Literature, 1983
58. Aaron Klug, born in Lithuania, Chemistry, 1982
59. John Robert Vane, Physiology or Medicine, 1982
60. Elias Canetti, born in Bulgaria, Literature, 1981
61. Frederick Sanger, Chemistry, 1980
62. W. Arthur Lewis, born on St. Lucia, Economics, 1979
63. Godfrey Hounsfield, Physiology or Medicine, 1979
64. Peter D. Mitchell, Chemistry, 1978
65. James Meade, Economics, 1977
66. Nevill Francis Mott, Physics, 1977
67. Amnesty International, Peace, 1977
68. Mairead Corrigan, Peace, 1976
69. Betty Williams, Peace, 1976
70. John Cornforth, born in Australia, Chemistry, 1975
71. Christian de Duve*, Physiology or Medicine, 1974
72. Friedrich Hayek, born in Austria, Economics, 1974
73. Martin Ryle, Physics, 1974
74. Antony Hewish, Physics, 1974
75. Patrick White*, Literature, 1973
76. Geoffrey Wilkinson, Chemistry, 1973
77. Brian David Josephson, Physics, 1973
78. Nikolaas Tinbergen, born in the Netherlands, Physiology or Medicine, 1973
79. Rodney Robert Porter, Physiology or Medicine, 1972
80. John Hicks, Economics, 1972
81. Dennis Gabor, born in Hungary, Physics, 1971
82. Bernard Katz, born in Germany, Physiology or Medicine, 1970
83. Derek Harold Richard Barton, Chemistry, 1969
84. Ronald George Wreyford Norrish, Chemistry, 1967
85. George Porter, Chemistry, 1967
86. Dorothy Crowfoot Hodgkin, Chemistry, 1964
87. Andrew Huxley, Physiology or Medicine, 1963
88. Alan Lloyd Hodgkin, Physiology or Medicine, 1963
89. John Kendrew, Chemistry, 1962
90. Max Perutz, born in Austria, Chemistry, 1962
91. Francis Crick, Physiology or Medicine, 1962
92. Maurice Wilkins, born in New Zealand, Physiology or Medicine, 1962
93. Peter Medawar, born in Brazil, Physiology or Medicine, 1960
94. Philip Noel-Baker, Peace, 1959
95. Frederick Sanger, Chemistry, 1958
96. Alexander R. Todd, Baron Todd, Chemistry, 1957
97. Cyril Norman Hinshelwood, Chemistry, 1956
98. Max Born, born in then Germany, now Poland, Physics, 1954
99. Winston Churchill, Literature, 1953
100. Hans Adolf Krebs, born in Germany, Physiology or Medicine, 1953
101. Archer John Porter Martin, Chemistry, 1952
102. Richard Laurence Millington Synge, Chemistry, 1952
103. John Cockcroft, Physics, 1951
104. Bertrand Russell, Literature, 1950
105. Cecil Frank Powell, Physics, 1950
106. John Boyd Orr, Peace, 1949
107. T. S. Eliot, born in the United States, Literature, 1948
108. Patrick Blackett, Baron Blackett, Physics, 1948
109. Edward Victor Appleton, Physics, 1947
110. Robert Robinson, Chemistry, 1947
111. Friends Service Council, Peace, 1947
112. Ernst Boris Chain, born in Germany, Physiology or Medicine, 1945
113. Alexander Fleming, Physiology or Medicine, 1945
114. George Paget Thomson, Physics, 1937
115. Robert Cecil, 1st Viscount Cecil of Chelwood, Peace, 1937
116. Norman Haworth, Chemistry, 1937
117. Henry Hallett Dale, Physiology or Medicine, 1936
118. James Chadwick, Physics, 1935
119. Arthur Henderson, Peace, 1934
120. Norman Angell, Peace, 1933
121. Paul Dirac, Physics, 1933
122. Charles Scott Sherrington, Physiology or Medicine, 1932
123. John Galsworthy, Literature, 1932
124. Edgar Adrian, 1st Baron Adrian, Physiology or Medicine, 1932
125. Arthur Harden, Chemistry, 1929
126. Frederick Hopkins, Physiology or Medicine, 1929
127. Owen Willans Richardson, Physics, 1928
128. Charles Thomson Rees Wilson, Physics, 1927
129. Austen Chamberlain, Peace, 1925
130. George Bernard Shaw, born in Ireland (Then part of the United Kingdom of Great Britain and Ireland), Literature, 1925
131. John Macleod*, Physiology or Medicine, 1923
132. Archibald Vivian Hill, Physiology or Medicine, 1922
133. Francis William Aston, Chemistry, 1922
134. Frederick Soddy, Chemistry, 1921
135. Charles Glover Barkla, Physics, 1917
136. William Henry Bragg, Physics, 1915
137. William Lawrence Bragg, born in Australia, Physics, 1915
138. Ernest Rutherford, born in New Zealand, Chemistry, 1908
139. Rudyard Kipling, born in India, Literature, 1907
140. J. J. Thomson, Physics, 1906
141. John Strutt, 3rd Baron Rayleigh, Physics, 1904
142. William Ramsay, Chemistry, 1904
143. William Randal Cremer, Peace, 1903
144. Ronald Ross, born in India, Physiology or Medicine, 1902

=== United States ===
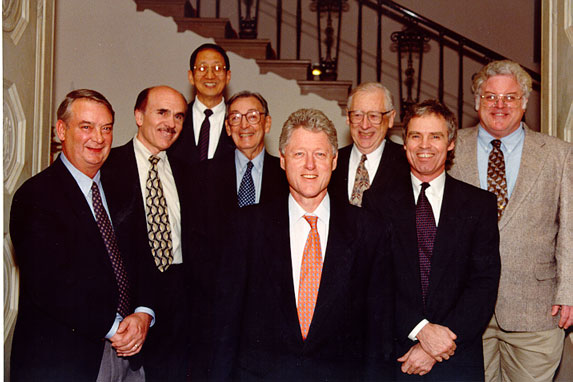
President Clinton meets the 1998 U.S. Nobel Prize winners in the White House.

1. Michael Woodford, Economics, 2026
2. Robert Hall, Economics, 2026
3. Francis Halzen, born in Belgium, Physics, 2026
4. Karl Deisseroth, Physiology or Medicine, 2026
5. Joel Mokyr, born in the Netherlands, Economics, 2025
6. Omar M. Yaghi, born in Jordan, Chemistry, 2025
7. John M. Martinis, Physics, 2025
8. Mary E. Brunkow, Physiology or Medicine, 2025
9. Fred Ramsdell, Physiology or Medicine, 2025
10. Daron Acemoglu, born in Turkey, Economics, 2024
11. Simon Johnson, born in United Kingdom, Economics, 2024
12. James A. Robinson, born in United Kingdom, Economics, 2024
13. John M. Jumper, Chemistry, 2024
14. David Baker, Chemistry, 2024
15. John Hopfield, Physics, 2024
16. Victor Ambros, Physiology or Medicine, 2024
17. Gary Ruvkun, Physiology or Medicine, 2024
18. Claudia Goldin, Economics, 2023
19. Louis Brus, Chemistry, 2023
20. Moungi Bawendi, born in France, Chemistry, 2023
21. Alexei Ekimov, born in former USSR, Chemistry, 2023
22. Drew Weissman, Physiology or Medicine, 2023
23. Katalin Karikó, born in Hungary, Physiology or Medicine, 2023
24. Ben Bernanke, Economics, 2022
25. Douglas Diamond, Economics, 2022
26. Philip H. Dybvig, Economics, 2022
27. Carolyn R. Bertozzi, Chemistry, 2022
28. K. Barry Sharpless, Chemistry, 2022
29. John Clauser, Physics, 2022
30. David Card, born in Canada, Economics, 2021
31. Joshua Angrist, Economics, 2021
32. Guido Imbens, born in Netherlands, Economics, 2021
33. Maria Ressa, born in Philippines, Peace, 2021
34. Syukuro Manabe, born in Japan, Physics, 2021
35. David MacMillan, born in United Kingdom, Chemistry, 2021
36. David Julius, Physiology or Medicine, 2021
37. Ardem Patapoutian, born in Lebanon, Physiology or Medicine, 2021
38. Robert B. Wilson, Economics, 2020
39. Paul R. Milgrom, Economics, 2020
40. Louise Glück, Literature, 2020
41. Jennifer Doudna, Chemistry, 2020
42. Andrea Ghez, Physics, 2020
43. Harvey J. Alter, Physiology or Medicine, 2020
44. Charles M. Rice, Physiology or Medicine, 2020
45. Abhijit Banerjee, born in India, Economics, 2019
46. Esther Duflo, born in France, Economics, 2019
47. Michael Kremer, Economics, 2019
48. John B. Goodenough, born in Germany, Chemistry, 2019
49. M. Stanley Whittingham, born in United Kingdom, Chemistry, 2019
50. Jim Peebles, born in Canada, Physics, 2019
51. William Kaelin Jr., Physiology or Medicine, 2019
52. Gregg L. Semenza, Physiology or Medicine, 2019
53. Paul Romer, Economics, 2018
54. William Nordhaus, Economics, 2018
55. George P. Smith, Chemistry, 2018
56. Frances Arnold, Chemistry, 2018
57. Arthur Ashkin, Physics, 2018
58. James Allison, Physiology or Medicine, 2018
59. Richard H. Thaler, Economics, 2017
60. Joachim Frank, born in Germany, Chemistry, 2017
61. Rainer Weiss, born in Germany, Physics, 2017
62. Kip Thorne, Physics, 2017
63. Barry Barish, Physics, 2017
64. Michael W. Young, Physiology or Medicine, 2017
65. Michael Rosbash, Physiology or Medicine, 2017
66. Jeffrey C. Hall, Physiology or Medicine, 2017
67. Bob Dylan, Literature, 2016
68. Oliver Hart, born in United Kingdom, Economics, 2016
69. Fraser Stoddart, born in United Kingdom, Chemistry, 2016
70. F. Duncan M. Haldane, born in United Kingdom, Physics, 2016
71. John M. Kosterlitz, born in United Kingdom, Physics, 2016
72. Angus Deaton, born in United Kingdom, Economics, 2015
73. Paul L. Modrich, Chemistry, 2015
74. Aziz Sancar, born in Turkey, Chemistry, 2015
75. William C. Campbell, born in Ireland, Physiology or Medicine, 2015
76. William E. Moerner, Chemistry, 2014
77. Eric Betzig, Chemistry, 2014
78. Shuji Nakamura, born in Japan, Physics, 2014
79. John O'Keefe*, Physiology or Medicine, 2014
80. Robert J. Shiller, Economics, 2013
81. Lars Peter Hansen, Economics, 2013
82. Eugene F. Fama, Economics, 2013
83. Arieh Warshel, born in Israel, Chemistry, 2013
84. Michael Levitt, born in South Africa, Chemistry, 2013
85. Martin Karplus, born in Austria, Chemistry, 2013
86. Randy Schekman, Physiology or Medicine, 2013
87. Thomas C. Südhof, born in Germany, Physiology or Medicine, 2013
88. James Rothman, Physiology or Medicine, 2013
89. Alvin E. Roth, Economics, 2012
90. Lloyd S. Shapley, Economics, 2012
91. Brian K. Kobilka, Chemistry, 2012
92. Robert J. Lefkowitz, Chemistry, 2012
93. David J. Wineland, Physics, 2012
94. Christopher A. Sims, Economics, 2011
95. Thomas J. Sargent, Economics, 2011
96. Saul Perlmutter, Physics, 2011
97. Brian P. Schmidt, Physics, 2011
98. Adam G. Riess, Physics, 2011
99. Ralph M. Steinman, born in Canada, Physiology or Medicine, 2011
100. Bruce Beutler, Physiology or Medicine, 2011
101. Peter A. Diamond, Economics, 2010
102. Dale T. Mortensen, Economics, 2010
103. Ei-ichi Negishi, Japanese citizenship, Chemistry, 2010
104. Richard F. Heck, Chemistry, 2010
105. Elinor Ostrom, Economics, 2009
106. Oliver Eaton Williamson, Economics, 2009
107. Barack H. Obama, Peace, 2009
108. Venkatraman Ramakrishnan, born in India, Chemistry, 2009
109. Thomas A. Steitz, Chemistry, 2009
110. Willard S. Boyle, born in Canada, Physics, 2009
111. Charles K. Kao, born in China, Physics, 2009
112. George E. Smith, Physics, 2009
113. Elizabeth Blackburn, born in Australia, Physiology or Medicine, 2009
114. Carol W. Greider, Physiology or Medicine, 2009
115. Jack W. Szostak, born in United Kingdom, Physiology or Medicine, 2009
116. Paul Krugman, Economics, 2008
117. Roger Yonchien Tsien, Chemistry, 2008
118. Martin Chalfie, Chemistry, 2008
119. Osamu Shimomura, Japanese citizenship, Chemistry, 2008
120. Yoichiro Nambu, born in Japan, Physics, 2008
121. Leonid Hurwicz, born in Russia, Economics, 2007
122. Eric S. Maskin, Economics, 2007
123. Roger B. Myerson, Economics, 2007
124. Al Gore, Peace, 2007
125. Mario R. Capecchi, born in Italy, Physiology or Medicine, 2007
126. Oliver Smithies, born in United Kingdom, Physiology or Medicine, 2007
127. Roger D. Kornberg, Chemistry, 2006
128. John C. Mather, Physics, 2006
129. Edmund S. Phelps, Economics, 2006
130. George F. Smoot, Physics, 2006
131. Andrew Z. Fire, Physiology or Medicine, 2006
132. Craig C. Mello, Physiology or Medicine, 2006
133. Robert Aumann*, as an Israeli citizen, Economics, 2005
134. Robert H. Grubbs, Chemistry, 2005
135. Richard R. Schrock, Chemistry, 2005
136. Thomas Schelling, Economics, 2005
137. John L. Hall, Physics, 2005
138. Roy J. Glauber, Physics, 2005
139. Irwin Rose, Chemistry, 2004
140. Edward C. Prescott, Economics, 2004
141. David J. Gross, Physics, 2004
142. H. David Politzer, Physics, 2004
143. Frank Wilczek, Physics, 2004
144. Richard Axel, Physiology or Medicine, 2004
145. Linda B. Buck, Physiology or Medicine, 2004
146. Peter Agre, Chemistry, 2003
147. Roderick MacKinnon, Chemistry, 2003
148. Robert F. Engle, Economics, 2003
149. Anthony J. Leggett, born in United Kingdom, Physics, 2003
150. Paul C. Lauterbur, Physiology or Medicine, 2003
151. Alexei Alexeyevich Abrikosov, born in Russia, Physics, 2003
152. Daniel Kahneman, born in Israel, Economics, 2002
153. Vernon L. Smith, Economics, 2002
154. Jimmy Carter, Peace, 2002
155. John Bennett Fenn, Chemistry, 2002
156. Raymond Davis Jr., Physics, 2002
157. Riccardo Giacconi, born in Italy, Physics, 2002
158. Sydney Brenner, born in South Africa, Physiology or Medicine, 2002
159. H. Robert Horvitz, Physiology or Medicine, 2002
160. William S. Knowles, Chemistry, 2001
161. K. Barry Sharpless, Chemistry, 2001
162. Joseph E. Stiglitz, Economics, 2001
163. George A. Akerlof, Economics, 2001
164. A. Michael Spence, Economics, 2001
165. Eric A. Cornell, Physics, 2001
166. Carl E. Wieman, Physics, 2001
167. Leland H. Hartwell, Physiology or Medicine, 2001
168. Alan Heeger, Chemistry, 2000
169. Alan MacDiarmid, born in New Zealand, Chemistry, 2000
170. James J. Heckman, Economics, 2000
171. Daniel L. McFadden, Economics, 2000
172. Jack Kilby, Physics, 2000
173. Paul Greengard, Physiology or Medicine, 2000
174. Eric Kandel, born in Austria, Physiology or Medicine, 2000
175. Ahmed H. Zewail, born in Egypt (dual-national), Chemistry, 1999
176. Günter Blobel, born in then Germany, now Poland, Physiology or Medicine, 1999
177. Walter Kohn, born in Austria, Chemistry, 1998
178. Horst Ludwig Störmer, born in Germany, Physics, 1998
179. Robert B. Laughlin, Physics, 1998
180. Daniel C. Tsui, born in China, Physics, 1998
181. Robert F. Furchgott, Physiology or Medicine, 1998
182. Louis J. Ignarro, Physiology or Medicine, 1998
183. Ferid Murad, Physiology or Medicine, 1998
184. Paul D. Boyer, Chemistry, 1997
185. Robert C. Merton, Economics, 1997
186. Myron Scholes, born in Canada, Economics, 1997
187. Jody Williams, Peace, 1997
188. Steven Chu, Physics, 1997
189. William D. Phillips, Physics, 1997
190. Stanley B. Prusiner, Physiology or Medicine, 1997
191. Richard E. Smalley, Chemistry, 1996
192. Robert F. Curl Jr., Chemistry, 1996
193. William Vickrey, born in Canada, Economics, 1996
194. David M. Lee, Physics, 1996
195. Douglas D. Osheroff, Physics, 1996
196. Robert C. Richardson, Physics, 1996
197. Mario J. Molina, born in Mexico, Chemistry, 1995
198. F. Sherwood Rowland, Chemistry, 1995
199. Robert Lucas Jr., Economics, 1995
200. Martin L. Perl, Physics, 1995
201. Frederick Reines, Physics, 1995
202. Edward B. Lewis, Physiology or Medicine, 1995
203. Eric F. Wieschaus, Physiology or Medicine, 1995
204. George Andrew Olah, born in Hungary, Chemistry, 1994
205. John Harsanyi, born in Hungary, Economics, 1994
206. John Forbes Nash, Economics, 1994
207. Clifford G. Shull, Physics, 1994
208. Alfred G. Gilman, Physiology or Medicine, 1994
209. Martin Rodbell, Physiology or Medicine, 1994
210. Kary B. Mullis, Chemistry, 1993
211. Robert W. Fogel, Economics, 1993
212. Douglass C. North, Economics, 1993
213. Toni Morrison, Literature, 1993
214. Russell A. Hulse, Physics, 1993
215. Joseph H. Taylor Jr., Physics, 1993
216. Phillip A. Sharp, Physiology or Medicine, 1993
217. Rudolph A. Marcus, born in Canada, Chemistry, 1992
218. Gary S. Becker, Economics, 1992
219. Edmond H. Fischer, born in China, Physiology or Medicine, 1992
220. Edwin G. Krebs, Physiology or Medicine, 1992
221. Ronald Coase, born in the United Kingdom, Economics, 1991
222. Elias James Corey, Chemistry, 1990
223. Merton H. Miller, Economics, 1990
224. William F. Sharpe, Economics, 1990
225. Harry M. Markowitz, Economics, 1990
226. Jerome I. Friedman, Physics, 1990
227. Henry W. Kendall, Physics, 1990
228. Joseph E. Murray, Physiology or Medicine, 1990
229. E. Donnall Thomas, Physiology or Medicine, 1990
230. Sidney Altman, born in Canada, Chemistry, 1989
231. Thomas R. Cech, Chemistry, 1989
232. Hans G. Dehmelt, born in Germany, Physics, 1989
233. Norman F. Ramsey, Physics, 1989
234. J. Michael Bishop, Physiology or Medicine, 1989
235. Harold E. Varmus, Physiology or Medicine, 1989
236. Leon M. Lederman, Physics, 1988
237. Melvin Schwartz, Physics, 1988
238. Jack Steinberger, born in Germany, Physics, 1988
239. Gertrude B. Elion, Physiology or Medicine, 1988
240. George H. Hitchings, Physiology or Medicine, 1988
241. Charles J. Pedersen, born in Korea, Chemistry, 1987
242. Donald J. Cram, Chemistry, 1987
243. Robert M. Solow, Economics, 1987
244. Joseph Brodsky, born in Russia, Literature, 1987
245. Dudley R. Herschbach, Chemistry, 1986
246. Yuan T. Lee, born in Taiwan, Chemistry, 1986
247. James M. Buchanan, Economics, 1986
248. Elie Wiesel, born in Romania, Peace, 1986
249. Stanley Cohen, Physiology or Medicine, 1986
250. Rita Levi-Montalcini, born in Italy, Physiology or Medicine, 1986
251. Jerome Karle, Chemistry, 1985
252. Herbert A. Hauptman, Chemistry, 1985
253. Franco Modigliani, born in Italy, Economics, 1985
254. Michael S. Brown, Physiology or Medicine, 1985
255. Joseph L. Goldstein, Physiology or Medicine, 1985
256. Bruce Merrifield, Chemistry, 1984
257. Henry Taube, born in Canada, Chemistry, 1983
258. Gérard Debreu, born in France, Economics, 1983
259. William A. Fowler, Physics, 1983
260. Subrahmanyan Chandrasekhar, born in India, Physics, 1983
261. Barbara McClintock, Physiology or Medicine, 1983
262. George J. Stigler, Economics, 1982
263. Kenneth G. Wilson, Physics, 1982
264. Roald Hoffmann, born in then Poland, now Ukraine, Chemistry, 1981
265. James Tobin, Economics, 1981
266. Nicolaas Bloembergen, born in the Netherlands, Physics, 1981
267. Arthur L. Schawlow, Physics, 1981
268. David H. Hubel, born in Canada, Physiology or Medicine, 1981
269. Roger W. Sperry, Physiology or Medicine, 1981
270. Walter Gilbert, Chemistry, 1980
271. Paul Berg, Chemistry, 1980
272. Lawrence R. Klein, Economics, 1980
273. Czesław Miłosz, born in then Russian Empire, now Lithuania, Literature, 1980
274. James Cronin, Physics, 1980
275. Val Fitch, Physics, 1980
276. Baruj Benacerraf, born in Venezuela, Physiology or Medicine, 1980
277. George D. Snell, Physiology or Medicine, 1980
278. Herbert C. Brown, born in the United Kingdom, Chemistry, 1979
279. Theodore Schultz, Economics, 1979
280. Steven Weinberg, Physics, 1979
281. Sheldon Glashow, Physics, 1979
282. Allan M. Cormack, born in South Africa, Physiology or Medicine, 1979
283. Herbert A. Simon, Economics, 1978
284. Isaac Bashevis Singer, born in then Russian Empire, now Poland, Literature, 1978
285. Robert Woodrow Wilson, Physics, 1978
286. Arno Penzias, born in Germany, Physics, 1978
287. Hamilton O. Smith, Physiology or Medicine, 1978
288. Daniel Nathans, Physiology or Medicine, 1978
289. Philip Anderson, Physics, 1977
290. John H. van Vleck, Physics, 1977
291. Roger Guillemin, born in France, Physiology or Medicine, 1977
292. Andrew Schally, born in then Poland, now Lithuania, Physiology or Medicine, 1977
293. Rosalyn Yalow, Physiology or Medicine, 1977
294. William Lipscomb, Chemistry, 1976
295. Milton Friedman, Economics, 1976
296. Saul Bellow, born in Canada, Literature, 1976
297. Burton Richter, Physics, 1976
298. Samuel C. C. Ting, Physics, 1976
299. Baruch S. Blumberg, Physiology or Medicine, 1976
300. Daniel Carleton Gajdusek, Physiology or Medicine, 1976
301. Tjalling C. Koopmans, born in the Netherlands, Economics, 1975
302. Ben Roy Mottelson*, Physics, 1975
303. James Rainwater, Physics, 1975
304. David Baltimore, Physiology or Medicine, 1975
305. Renato Dulbecco, born in Italy, Physiology or Medicine, 1975
306. Howard Martin Temin, Physiology or Medicine, 1975
307. Paul J. Flory, Chemistry, 1974
308. George E. Palade, born in Romania, Physiology or Medicine, 1974
309. Wassily Leontief, born in Germany, Economics, 1973
310. Henry Kissinger, born in Germany, Peace, 1973
311. Ivar Giaever, Norway, Physics, 1973
312. Christian Anfinsen, Chemistry, 1972
313. Stanford Moore, Chemistry, 1972
314. William H. Stein, Chemistry, 1972
315. Kenneth J. Arrow, Economics, 1972
316. John Bardeen, Physics, 1972
317. Leon N. Cooper, Physics, 1972
318. Robert Schrieffer, Physics, 1972
319. Gerald Edelman, Physiology or Medicine, 1972
320. Simon Kuznets, born in then Russia, now Belarus, Economics, 1971
321. Earl W. Sutherland Jr., Physiology or Medicine, 1971
322. Paul A. Samuelson, Economics, 1970
323. Norman Borlaug, Peace, 1970
324. Julius Axelrod, Physiology or Medicine, 1970
325. Murray Gell-Mann, Physics, 1969
326. Max Delbrück, born in Germany, Physiology or Medicine, 1969
327. Alfred Hershey, Physiology or Medicine, 1969
328. Salvador Luria, born in Italy, Physiology or Medicine, 1969
329. Lars Onsager, born in Norway, Chemistry, 1968
330. Luis Alvarez, Physics, 1968
331. Robert W. Holley, Physiology or Medicine, 1968
332. Har Gobind Khorana, born in India, Physiology or Medicine, 1968
333. Marshall Warren Nirenberg, Physiology or Medicine, 1968
334. Hans Bethe, born in then Germany, now France, Physics, 1967
335. Haldan Keffer Hartline, Physiology or Medicine, 1967
336. George Wald, Physiology or Medicine, 1967
337. Robert S. Mulliken, Chemistry, 1966
338. Charles B. Huggins, born in Canada, Physiology or Medicine, 1966
339. Francis Peyton Rous, Physiology or Medicine, 1966
340. Robert B. Woodward, Chemistry, 1965
341. Richard P. Feynman, Physics, 1965
342. Julian Schwinger, Physics, 1965
343. Martin Luther King Jr., Peace, 1964
344. Charles H. Townes, Physics, 1964
345. Konrad Bloch, born in then Germany, now Poland, Physiology or Medicine, 1964
346. Maria Goeppert-Mayer, born in then Germany, now Poland, Physics, 1963
347. Eugene Wigner, born in Hungary, Physics, 1963
348. John Steinbeck, Literature, 1962
349. Linus C. Pauling, Peace, 1962
350. James D. Watson, Physiology or Medicine, 1962
351. Melvin Calvin, Chemistry, 1961
352. Robert Hofstadter, Physics, 1961
353. Georg von Békésy, born in Hungary, Physiology or Medicine, 1961
354. Willard F. Libby, Chemistry, 1960
355. Donald A. Glaser, Physics, 1960
356. Owen Chamberlain, Physics, 1959
357. Emilio Segrè, born in Italy, Physics, 1959
358. Arthur Kornberg, Physiology or Medicine, 1959
359. Severo Ochoa, born in Spain, Physiology or Medicine, 1959
360. George Beadle, Physiology or Medicine, 1958
361. Joshua Lederberg, Physiology or Medicine, 1958
362. Edward Tatum, Physiology or Medicine, 1958
363. Chen Ning Yang, born in China, Physics, 1957
364. Tsung-Dao Lee, born in China, Physics, 1957
365. William B. Shockley, Physics, 1956
366. John Bardeen, Physics, 1956
367. Walter H. Brattain, born in China, Physics, 1956
368. Dickinson W. Richards, Physiology or Medicine, 1956
369. André F. Cournand, France, Physiology or Medicine, 1956
370. Vincent du Vigneaud, Chemistry, 1955
371. Willis E. Lamb, Physics, 1955
372. Polykarp Kusch, born in Germany, Physics, 1955
373. Linus C. Pauling, Chemistry, 1954
374. Ernest Hemingway, Literature, 1954
375. John F. Enders, Physiology or Medicine, 1954
376. Frederick C. Robbins, Physiology or Medicine, 1954
377. Thomas H. Weller, Physiology or Medicine, 1954
378. George C. Marshall, Peace, 1953
379. Fritz Albert Lipmann, born in then Germany, now Russia, Physiology or Medicine, 1953
380. E. M. Purcell, Physics, 1952
381. Felix Bloch, born in Switzerland, Physics, 1952
382. Selman A. Waksman, born in then Russian Empire, now Ukraine, Physiology or Medicine, 1952
383. Edwin M. McMillan, Chemistry, 1951
384. Glenn Theodore Seaborg, Chemistry, 1951
385. Ralph J. Bunche, Peace, 1950
386. Philip S. Hench, Physiology or Medicine, 1950
387. Edward C. Kendall, Physiology or Medicine, 1950
388. William Giauque, born in Canada, Chemistry, 1949
389. William Faulkner, Literature, 1949
390. T. S. Eliot*, Literature, 1948
391. American Friends Service Committee (The Quakers), Peace, 1947
392. Carl Ferdinand Cori, born in Austria, Physiology or Medicine, 1947
393. Gerty Cori, born in Austria, Physiology or Medicine, 1947
394. Wendell M. Stanley, Chemistry, 1946
395. James B. Sumner, Chemistry, 1946
396. John H. Northrop, Chemistry, 1946
397. Emily G. Balch, Peace, 1946
398. John R. Mott, Peace, 1946
399. Percy W. Bridgman, Physics, 1946
400. Hermann J. Muller, Physiology or Medicine, 1946
401. Cordell Hull, Peace, 1945
402. Isidor Isaac Rabi, born in Austria, Physics, 1944
403. Joseph Erlanger, Physiology or Medicine, 1944
404. Herbert S. Gasser, Physiology or Medicine, 1944
405. Otto Stern, born in then Germany, now Poland, Physics, 1943
406. Edward A. Doisy, Physiology or Medicine, 1943
407. Ernest Lawrence, Physics, 1939
408. Pearl S. Buck, Literature, 1938
409. Clinton Davisson, Physics, 1937
410. Eugene O'Neill, Literature, 1936
411. Carl Anderson, Physics, 1936
412. Harold C. Urey, Chemistry, 1934
413. George R. Minot, Physiology or Medicine, 1934
414. William P. Murphy, Physiology or Medicine, 1934
415. George H. Whipple, Physiology or Medicine, 1934
416. Thomas H. Morgan, Physiology or Medicine, 1933
417. Irving Langmuir, Chemistry, 1932
418. Jane Addams, Peace, 1931
419. Nicholas M. Butler, Peace, 1931
420. Sinclair Lewis, Literature, 1930
421. Frank B. Kellogg, Peace, 1929
422. Arthur H. Compton, Physics, 1927
423. Charles G. Dawes, Peace, 1925
424. Robert A. Millikan, Physics, 1923
425. Woodrow Wilson, Peace, 1919
426. Theodore W. Richards, Chemistry, 1914
427. Elihu Root, Peace, 1912
428. Albert A. Michelson, born in then Germany, now Poland, Physics, 1907
429. Theodore Roosevelt, Peace, 1906

=== Venezuela ===
1. María Corina Machado, Peace, 2025
2. Baruj Benacerraf*, Physiology or Medicine, 1980

=== Vietnam ===
1. Lê Đức Thọ, born in French Indochina (now Vietnam), Peace, 1973 (declined)

=== Yemen ===
1. Tawakkol Karman, Peace, 2011

=== Yugoslavia ===
1. Ivo Andrić, born in the Dolac, Austria-Hungary (modern-day Bosnia and Herzegovina), Literature, 1961

=== Zimbabwe ===
1. Albert Lutuli, born in then Rhodesia, now Zimbabwe, Peace, 1960

== See also ==
- List of black Nobel laureates
- List of Asian Nobel laureates
- List of Jewish Nobel laureates
- List of Christian Nobel laureates
- List of nonreligious Nobel laureates
- List of Nobel laureates by university affiliation
