= List of nonreligious Nobel laureates =

List of self-identified nonreligious Nobel laureates

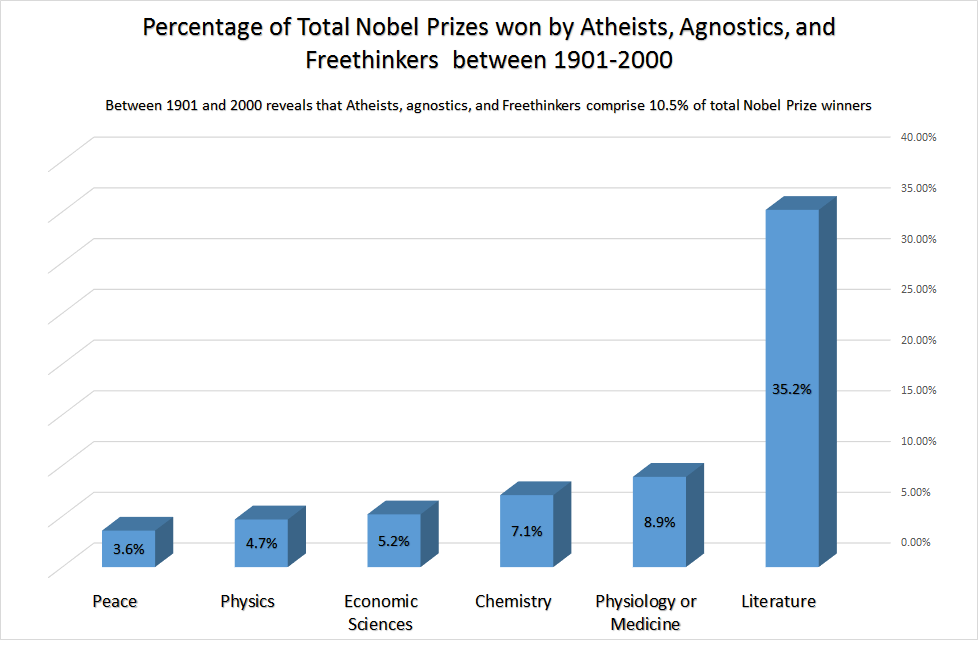
Distribution of atheists, agnostics, and freethinkers in Nobel Prizes between 1901-2000.

This list of nonreligious Nobel laureates comprises laureates of the Nobel Prize who have self-identified as atheist, agnostic, freethinker, or otherwise nonreligious at some point in their lives.

Many of these laureates earlier identified with a religion. In an estimate by Baruch Shalev, between 1901 and 2000, about 10.5% of all laureates, and 35% of those in literature, fall in this category. According to the same estimate, between 1901 and 2000, atheists, agnostics, and freethinkers won 8.9% of the prizes in medicine, 7.1% in chemistry, 5.2% in economics, 4.7% in physics, and 3.6% in peace. Alfred Nobel himself was an atheist later in life.

Shalev's book lists many Jewish atheists, agnostics, and freethinkers as religiously Jewish. For example, Milton Friedman, Roald Hoffmann, Richard Feynman, Niels Bohr, Élie Metchnikoff, and Rita Levi-Montalcini are listed as religiously Jewish; however, while they were ethnically and perhaps culturally Jewish, they did not believe in a God and self-identified as atheists.

== Physics ==
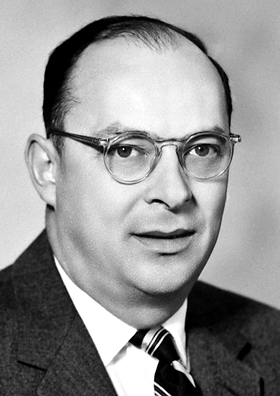
Bardeen

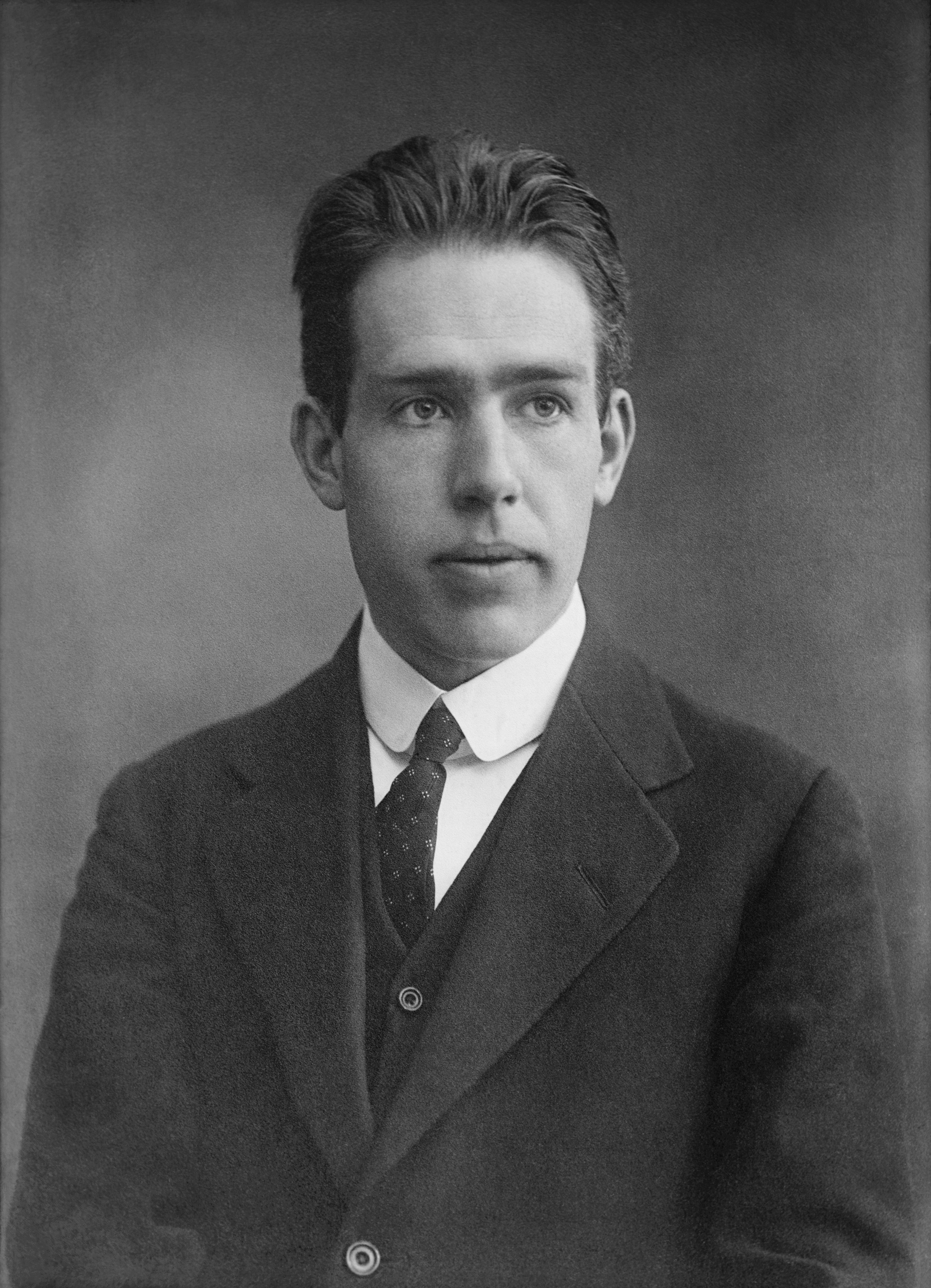
Bohr

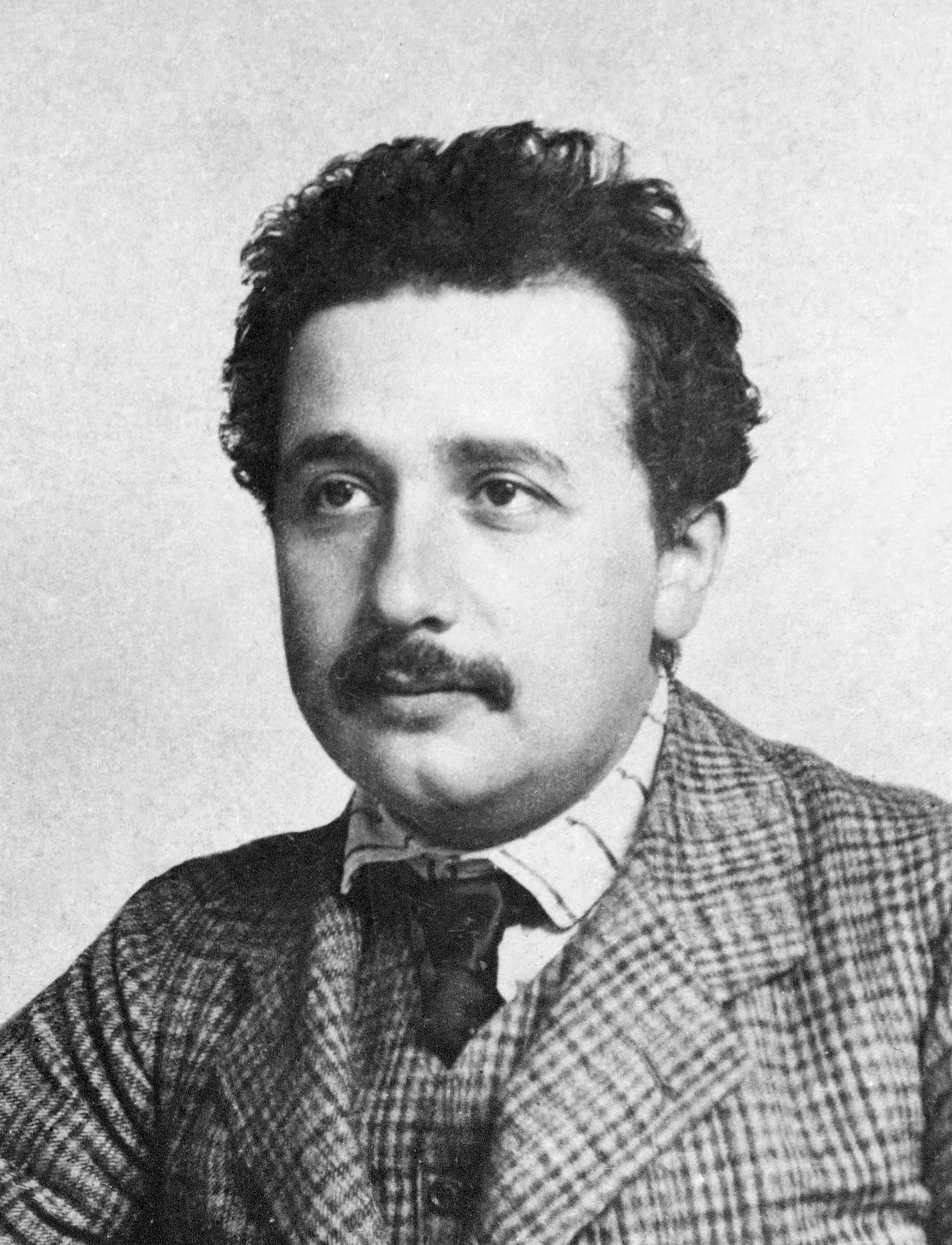
Einstein

Year	Laureate	Reference
2000	Zhores Alferov	
2024	Geoffrey Everest Hinton	
1977	Philip Warren Anderson	
1956, 1972	John Bardeen	
1967	Hans Bethe	
1948	Patrick Blackett	
1981	Nicolaas Bloembergen	
1922	Niels Bohr	
1946	Percy Williams Bridgman	
1929	Louis de Broglie	
1935	James Chadwick	
1903	Marie Curie	
1903	Pierre Curie	
1933	Paul Dirac	
1921	Albert Einstein	(Note: Einstein used many labels to describe his religious views, including "agnostic", "religious nonbeliever", and a believer in "Spinoza's God." He was an active participant in various humanist and Ethical Culture groups, including the First Humanist Society of New York and the Rationalist Association (UK). He disliked labels like "atheist" and "pantheist". See also Religious and philosophical views of Albert Einstein.)
1938	Enrico Fermi	
1965	Richard Feynman	
1980	Val Logsdon Fitch	
1925	James Franck	
1969	Murray Gell-Mann	
2002	Riccardo Giacconi	
1973	Ivar Giaver	
2003	Vitaly Ginzburg	
1979	Sheldon Glashow	
2005	Roy J. Glauber	
2004	David J. Gross	
1945	Wolfgang Pauli	
2012	Serge Haroche	
2013	Peter Higgs	
2002	Masatoshi Koshiba	
2016	J. Michael Kosterlitz	
2000	Herbert Kroemer	
1962	Lev Landau	
1988	Leon M. Lederman	
2019	Michel Mayor	
1907	Albert A. Michelson	
2010	Konstantin Novoselov	
2019	Jim Peebles	
1926	Jean Baptiste Perrin	
2019	Didier Queloz	
1944	Isidor Isaac Rabi	
2011	Brian Schmidt	
1933	Erwin Schrödinger	
1956	William Shockley	
1988	Jack Steinberger	
1958	Igor Tamm	
2017	Kip Thorne	
1910	Johannes Diderik van der Waals	
1999	Martinus J. G. Veltman	
1979	Steven Weinberg	
1963	Eugene Wigner	
2020	Roger Penrose	
1983	Subrahmanyan Chandrasekhar	

== Chemistry ==
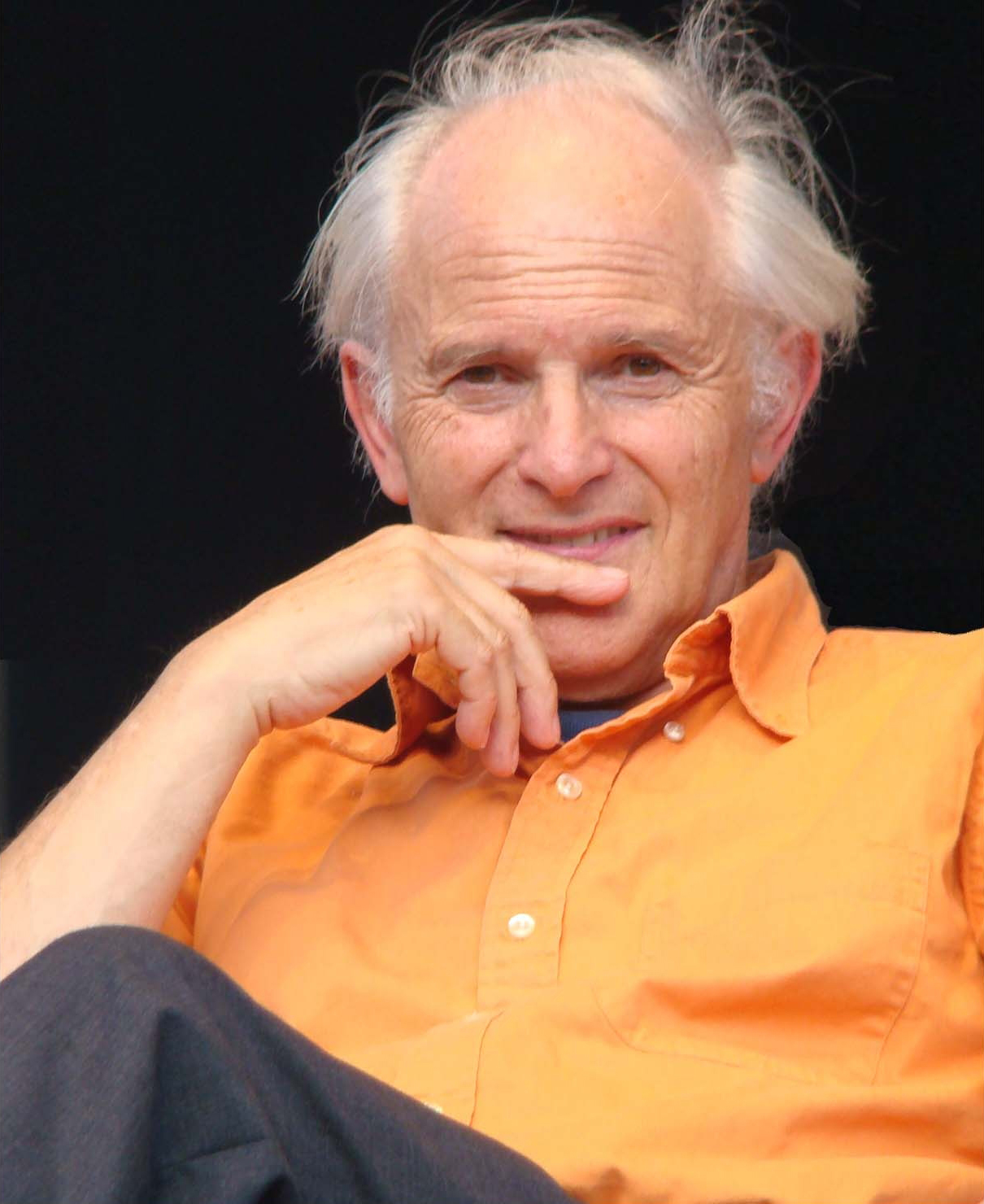
Kroto

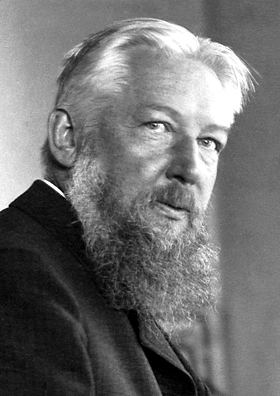
Ostwald

Year	Laureate	Reference
1903	Svante Arrhenius	
1997	Paul D. Boyer	
1975	John Cornforth	
1911	Marie Curie	
1935	Frédéric Joliot-Curie	
1935	Irène Joliot-Curie	
1985	Herbert A. Hauptman	
1981	Roald Hoffmann	
1996	Harold W. Kroto	
1987	Jean-Marie Lehn	
1978	Peter D. Mitchell	
1994	George Andrew Olah	
1909	Wilhelm Ostwald	
1954	Linus Pauling	
1962	Max Perutz	
1958	Frederick Sanger	
2011	Dan Shechtman	
2020	Emmanuelle Charpentier	
2018	George Smith	
1993	Michael Smith	
1934	Harold Urey	

== Physiology or Medicine ==
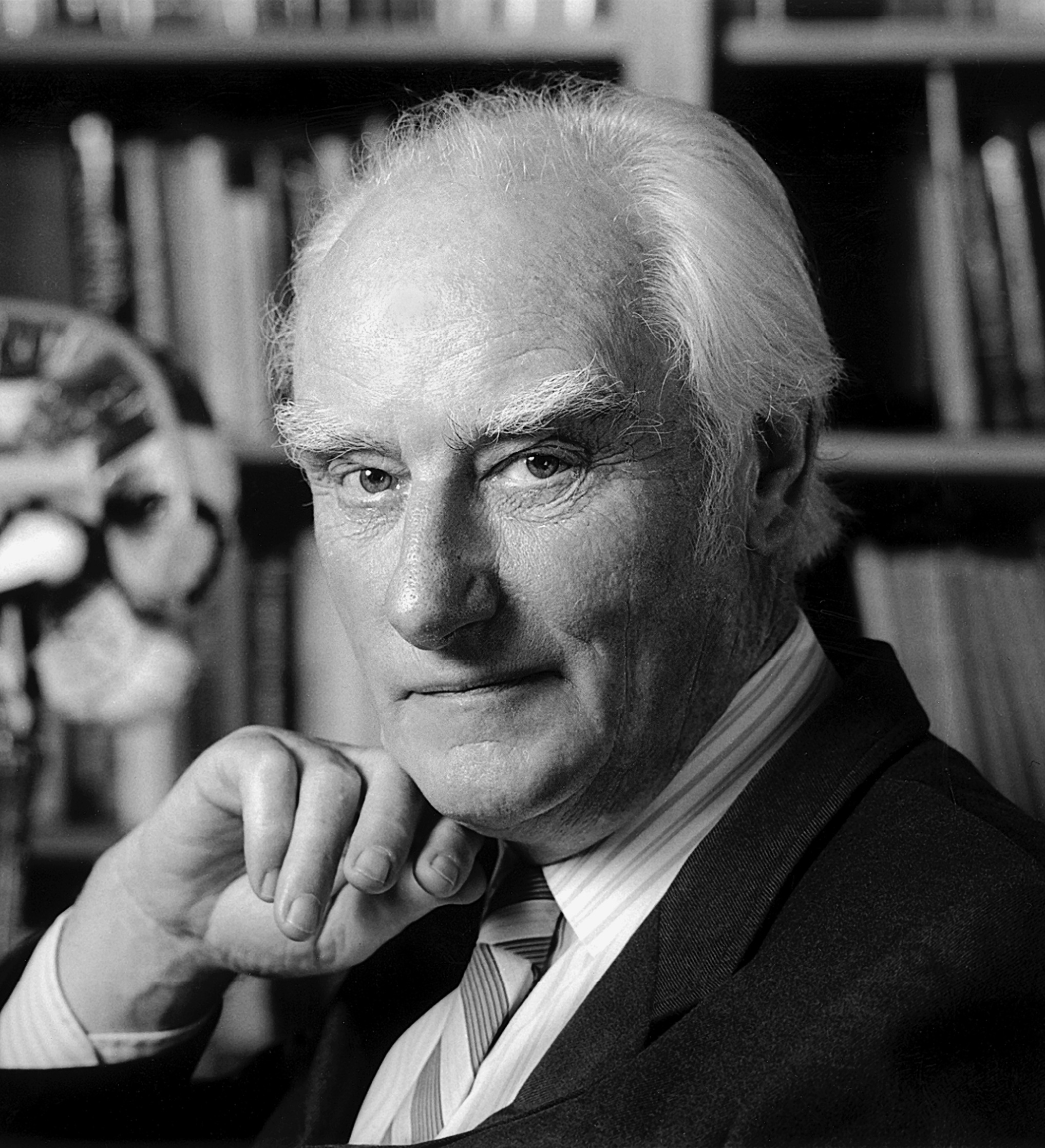
Crick

Year	Laureate	Reference
1970	Julius Axelrod	
1914	Robert Bárány	
1958	George Beadle	
1989	J. Michael Bishop	
2002	Sydney Brenner	
1962	Francis Crick	
1974	Christian de Duve	
1945	Howard Florey	
1906	Camillo Golgi	
1929	Frederick Gowland Hopkins	
1963	Andrew Huxley	
1965	François Jacob	
2003	Paul Lauterbur	
1907	Charles Louis Alphonse Laveran	
1986	Rita Levi-Montalcini	
1960	Sir Peter Medawar	
1908	Élie Metchnikoff	
1965	Jacques Monod	
1946	Hermann Joseph Muller	
2001	Paul Nurse	
1904	Ivan Pavlov	
1993	Richard J. Roberts	
2017	Michael Rosbash	
2002	John Sulston	
1937	Albert Szent-Györgyi	
1973	Nikolaas Tinbergen	
1967	George Wald	
1962	James Watson	

== Economics ==
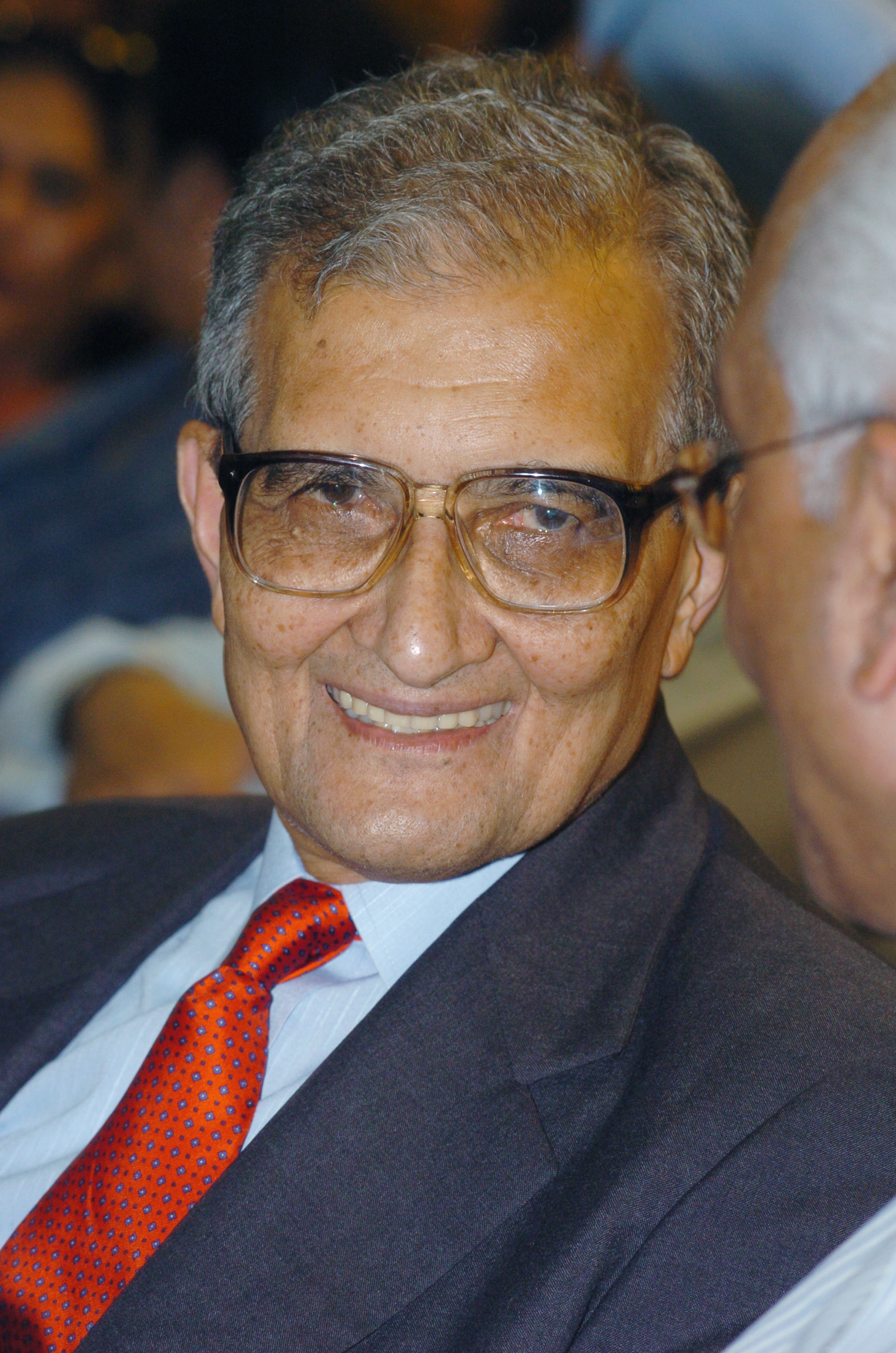
Sen

Year	Laureate	Reference
1976	Milton Friedman	
1994	John Harsanyi	
1974	Friedrich Hayek	
1994	John Forbes Nash, Jr.	
1994	Reinhard Selten	
1998	Amartya Sen	
1978	Herbert A. Simon	

== Peace ==
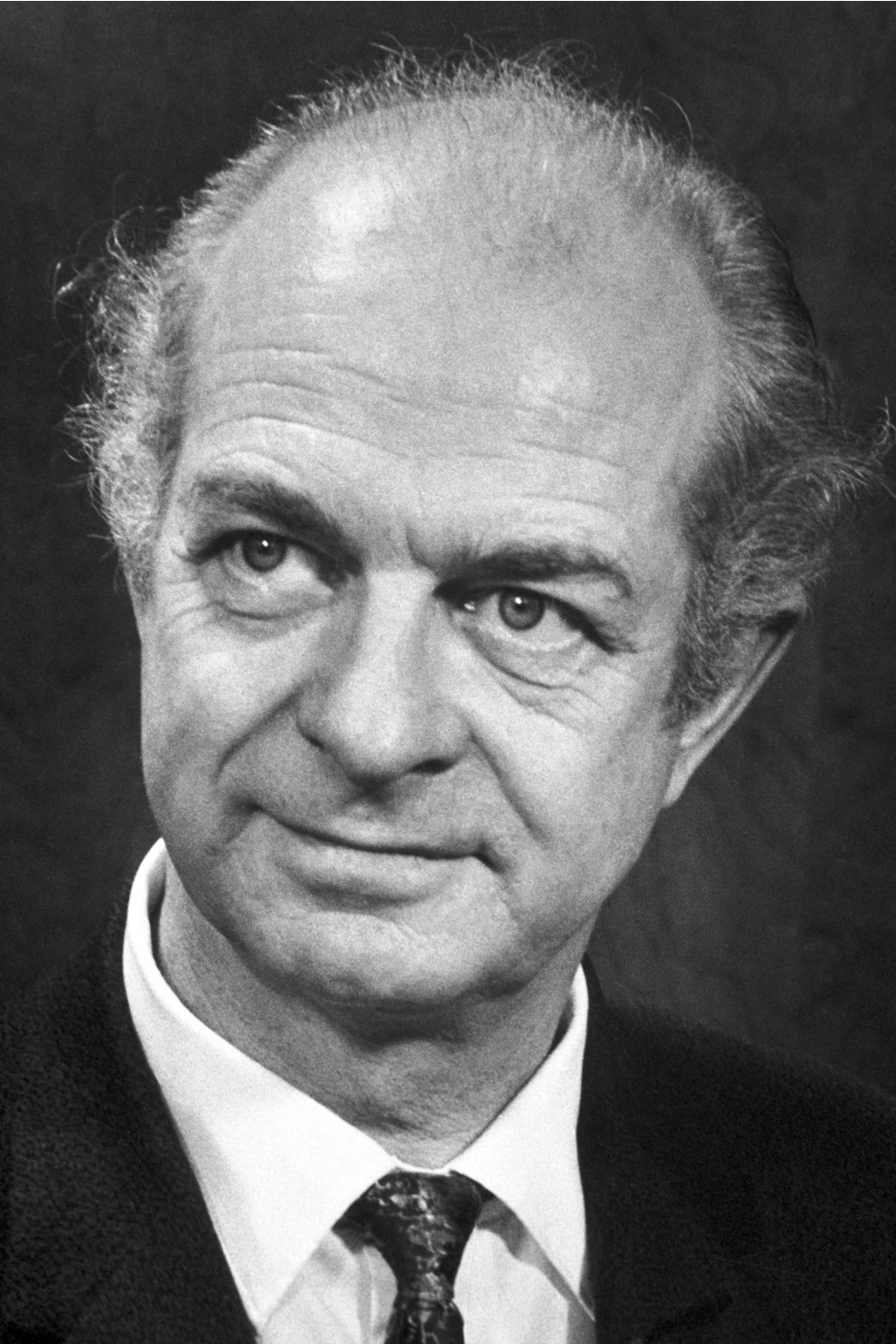
Pauling

Year	Laureate	Reference
1933	Norman Angell	
1908	Klas Pontus Arnoldson	
1990	Mikhail Gorbachev	
1962	Linus Pauling	
1995	Joseph Rotblat	
1975	Andrei Sakharov	
1986	Elie Wiesel	
1973	Lê Đức Thọ	

== Literature ==
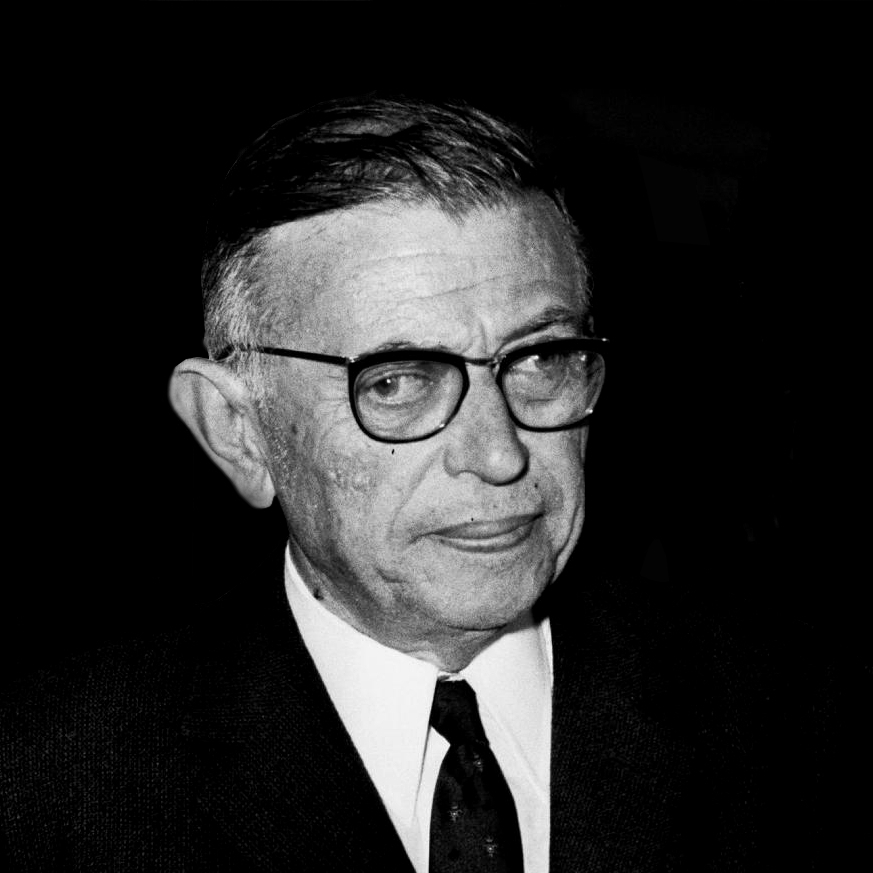
Sartre

Year	Laureate	Reference
1969	Samuel Beckett	
1903	Bjørnstjerne Bjørnson	
1957	Albert Camus	
1997	Dario Fo	
1932	John Galsworthy	
1991	Nadine Gordimer	
1971	Pablo Neruda	
1936	Eugene O'Neill	
2005	Harold Pinter	
1950	Bertrand Russell	
1998	José Saramago	
1964	Jean-Paul Sartre	
1925	George Bernard Shaw	
1986	Wole Soyinka	
1962	John Steinbeck	
1996	Wisława Szymborska	
2018	Olga Tokarczuk	
2000	Gao Xingjian	

== See also ==
- List of Christian Nobel laureates
- List of Jewish Nobel laureates
- List of Nobel laureates
