= Lawrence Finsen =

Philosopher

Lawrence Finsen is a professor of philosophy at University of Redlands in California, specializing in animal ethics. With his wife Susan Finsen, he is the author of The Animal Rights Movement in America: From Compassion to Respect (1994).

== Education ==
Finsen attended public schools in Newton, Massachusetts. He obtained his BA in philosophy in 1973 from Lake Forest College, and his PhD in philosophy in 1982 from the State University of New York at Buffalo for a thesis on Roderick Chisholm and the mind-body problem. He became interested in animal rights after reading Peter Singer's Animal Liberation (1975). He joined the philosophy department at Redlands in 1979, and has taught courses in England on the animal rights movement, in mainland Europe on the Holocaust, and in 2004 spent a semester teaching at Reitaku University in Japan.

Finsen focuses in particular on the issue of collective responsibility in relation to the treatment of animals, the extent to which individual actors feel impotent in the face of industrial processes such as factory farming, and whether such situations nevertheless confer on those individuals a moral responsibility.

== Selected publications ==
- "Animal Rights, Animal Liberation: Seminal Ideas in the Movement to Extend Moral Consideration to Nonhuman Animals," Studies in Moralogy, September 2005.
- "The ALF and the Unnecessary Fuss Video" in Kelly Wand (ed). The Animal Rights Movement. Greenhaven Press, 2003.
- "Faculty As Institutional Citizens: Reconceiving Service and Governance Work," in Linda A. McMillan & William G. (Jerry) Berberet. New Academic Compact: Revisioning the Relationship Between Faculty and Their Institutions. Anker Pub Co, 2001.
- with Nancy Carrick. The Persuasive Pen: An Integrated Approach to Reasoning and Writing. Jones & Bartlett, 1997.
- with Susan Finsen. The Animal Rights Movement in America: From Compassion to Respect. Twayne Publishers, 1994.
- "Comment on James Nelson's 'Animals in "Exemplary" Medical Research: Diabetes as a Case Study'", Between the Species, Vol. 5 (1989) Issue 4.
- "Institutional Animal Care and Use Committees: A New Set of Clothes for the Emperor?", Journal of Medicine and Philosophy, 1988 May;13(2):145-158.
- with Susan Finsen. "How clever was the old fox?", Between the Species, Vol. 4 (1988) Issue 2.
- "'His Heart Exposed to Prying Eyes, To Pity Has No Claim': Reflections on Hogarth and the Nature of Cruelty", Between the Species, Vol. 2 (1986) Issue 1.

== See also ==
- List of animal rights advocates
