= Susan Finsen =

American philosopher

Susan Finsen is an American philosopher, currently professor emeritus of philosophy and former chair of the department at California State University, San Bernardino. She specializes in moral philosophy, with a particular interest in animal rights, as well as philosophy of science and philosophy of biology. She is the co-author, with her husband Lawrence Finsen, of The Animal Rights Movement in America: From Compassion to Respect (1994), and is the director of Californians for the Ethical Treatment of Animals.

Finsen received her PhD in philosophy from Indiana University Bloomington in 1982. Susan Finsen was formerly known as Susan K. Mills.
