= Finsen Laboratory =

The Finsen Laboratory is a cancer research lab at Rigshospitalet which is a part of Copenhagen University Hospital, Denmark. The lab was named in honour of the nobel laureate Niels Finsen.

The lab conducts research about several aspects of how the plasminogen activation system contributes to tumor malignancy and metastasis. It has also contributed to the Pan-Cancer Analysis of Whole Genomes (PCAWG) on cancer genomics.
