= Niels Ryberg Finsen =

Faroese physician and Nobel laureate (1860–1904)

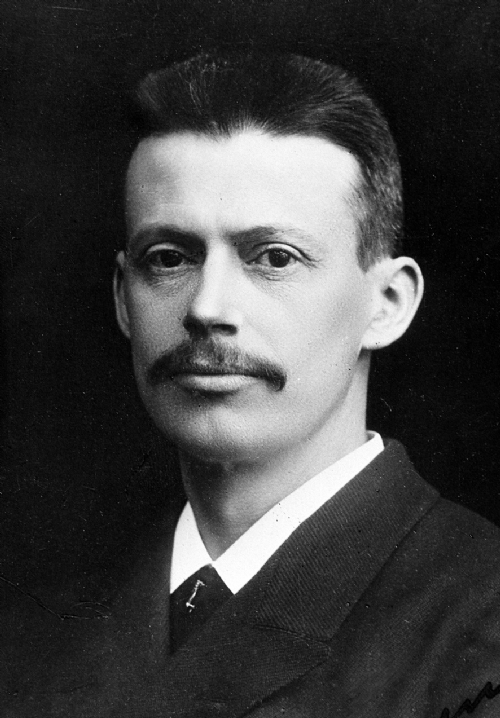
- Born: 15 December 1860; Tórshavn, Faroe Islands
- Died: 24 September 1904 (aged 43); Copenhagen, Denmark
- Citizenship: Kingdom of Denmark
- Education: University of Copenhagen
- Known for: Phototherapy
- Awards: Nobel Prize in Physiology or Medicine (1903); Cameron Prize for Therapeutics of the University of Edinburgh (1904)

Niels Ryberg Finsen (15 December 1860 – 24 September 1904) was a physician and scientist. In 1903, he was awarded the Nobel Prize in Medicine and Physiology "in recognition of his contribution to the treatment of diseases, especially lupus vulgaris, with concentrated light radiation, whereby he has opened a new avenue for medical science."

== Biography ==
Niels Finsen was born in Tórshavn, Faroe Islands, as the second-oldest of four children. His father was Hannes Finsen, who belonged to an Icelandic family with traditions reaching back to the 10th century, and his mother was Johanne Formann from Falster, Denmark.

The family moved to Tórshavn from Iceland in 1858 when his father was given the position of Landfoged. When Niels was four years old his mother died, and his father married her cousin Birgitte Kirstine Formann, with whom he had six children. In 1871 his father was made Amtmand of the Faroe Islands. His father was a member of the Faroese parliament for 12 years, and his older brother Olaf Finsen similarly became a member of parliament, for five years, as well as the first mayor of the capital, Tórshavn.

Finsen got his early education in Tórshavn, but in 1874 was sent to the Danish boarding school Herlufsholm, where his older brother Olaf was also a student. Unlike Olaf, Niels had a difficult stay at Herlufsholm, culminating with a statement from the principal which claimed Niels was "a boy of good heart but low skills and energy". As a consequence of his low grades and difficulties with the Danish language, he was sent to Iceland in 1876 to enroll in his father's old school, Lærði skólinn, in Reykjavík. By the time he graduated he was 21 years old and finished 11 out of 15 students.

=== Studies in medicine ===
In 1882, Finsen moved to Copenhagen to study medicine at the University of Copenhagen, from which he graduated in 1890. Because he had studied in Iceland before moving to Copenhagen to study, he enjoyed privileged admission to Regensen, which is the most prestigious college dormitory in Denmark. Prioritisation of Icelandic and Faroese individuals in the admission process was official Danish government policy that had been put in place in order to integrate the educated elites of its colonies with the university population in Copenhagen. Following graduation, he became a prosector of anatomy at the university. After three years, he quit the post to devote himself fully to his scientific studies. In 1898 Finsen was given a professorship and in 1899 he became a Knight of the Order of Dannebrog.

The Finsen Institute was founded in 1896, with Finsen serving as its first director. It was later merged into Copenhagen University Hospital and currently serves as a cancer research laboratory that specializes in proteolysis.

Finsen suffered from Niemann–Pick disease, which inspired him to sunbathe and investigate the effects of light on living things. As a result, Finsen developed a theory of phototherapy, stating that certain wavelengths of light have beneficial medical effects. His most important writings were Finsen Om Lysets Indvirkninger paa Huden ("On the effects of light on the skin"), published in 1893 and Om Anvendelse i Medicinen af koncentrerede kemiske Lysstraaler ("The use of concentrated chemical light rays in medicine"), published in 1896. The papers were soon translated into both German and French. In later work he researched the effects of sodium chloride, observing the results of a low sodium diet, which he published in 1904 as En Ophobning af Salt i Organismen ("An accumulation of salt in the organism").

Finsen won the Nobel Prize in Physiology in 1903 for his work on phototherapy. He was the first Scandinavian to win the prize and is the only Faroese Nobel Laureate in physiology to date. In 1904, Finsen was awarded the Cameron Prize for Therapeutics of the University of Edinburgh.

=== Personal life ===
Finsen married Ingeborg Balslev (1868–1963) on 29 December 1892.

Finsen's health began to fail in the mid-1880s. He had symptoms of heart trouble and suffered from ascites and general weakness. The sickness disabled his body but not his mind, and he continued to work from his wheelchair. He died in Copenhagen on 24 September 1904. His autopsy also concluded the presence of echinococcosis as a contributing factor to his death. Accounts of his funeral can be found at the National Library of Medicine.

== Memorials ==
The Finsen Laboratory at Copenhagen University Hospital is named in his honor. Finsensvej in Frederiksberg is also named in his honor and so was the Finsen Power Station, which was located on its north side.

A large memorial to Finsen designed by Rudolph Tegner was installed next to Rigshospitalet in Copenhagen in 1909. It shows a standing naked man flanked by two kneeling naked women reaching up to the sky, with a third behind his back. The sculpture is entitled Mod lyset (Towards the Light), and symbolised Finsen's principal scientific theory that sunlight can have healing properties. It is situated on the corner of Blegdamsvej and Nørre Allé.

In Tórshavn there is also a memorial to Finsen and one of the city's main streets, Niels Finsens gøta, bears his name. Kommunuskúlin, the old public school in central Tórshavn is rebuilt for student housing with the new name Finsen.

Finsen Road in southeast London, near Denmark Hill, also commemorates Niels Finsen.
