= Klas Pontus Arnoldson =

Swedish author, journalist, politician and committed pacifist

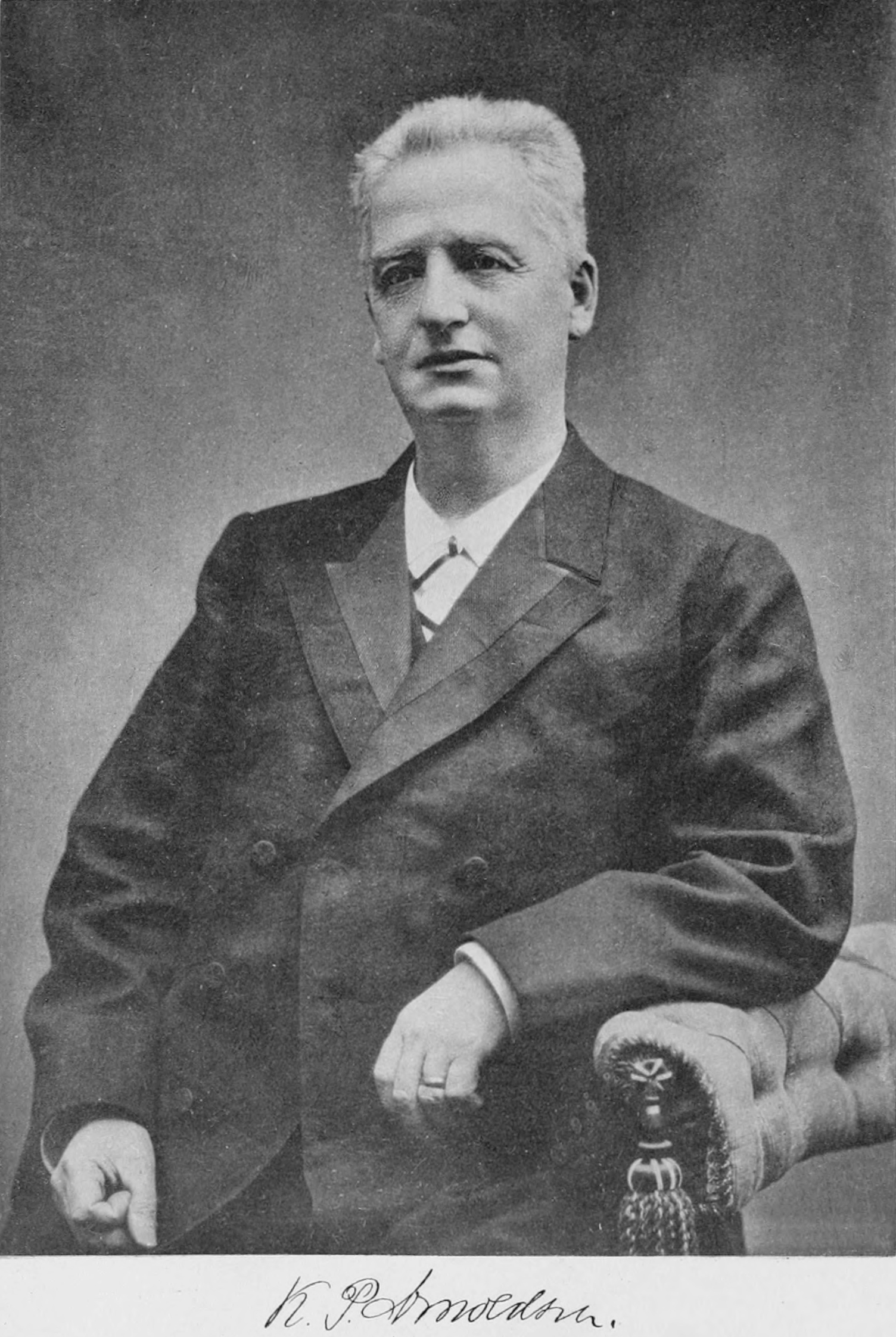
- Arnoldson, c. 1908
- Born: 27 October 1844; Gothenburg, Sweden
- Died: 20 February 1916 (aged 71); Stockholm, Sweden
- Awards: Nobel Peace Prize (1908)

Klas Pontus Arnoldson (27 October 1844 – 20 February 1916) was a Swedish author, journalist, politician, and committed pacifist who received the Nobel Peace Prize in 1908 with Fredrik Bajer. He was a founding member of the Swedish Peace and Arbitration Society and a Member of Parliament in the second Chamber of 1882–1887.

== Early life ==
Arnoldson became the railway clerk and rose to the post of stationmaster in the year 1871 to 1881. He left the railways and devoted entirely into politics. In 1881, he was elected to the riksdag, the Swedish parliament.

== Works ==
He attempted to shape the public opinion of both Norway and Sweden in favour of peaceful settlement. He also wrote journalistic pieces such as "Is World Peace Possible?", "Religion in the Light of Research", and "The Hope of the Centuries".

== See also ==
- List of peace activists
