= 2017 Nobel Peace Prize =

- International Campaign to Abolish Nuclear Weapons (ICAN)
- "for its work to draw attention to the catastrophic humanitarian consequences of any use of nuclear weapons and for its ground-breaking efforts to achieve a treaty-based prohibition of such weapons."
- Date: 6 October 2017 (announcement by Berit Reiss-Andersen); 10 December 2017 (ceremony)
- Location: Oslo, Norway
- Presented by: Norwegian Nobel Committee
- Rewards: 9 million SEK ($1.11M, €0.94M)
- First award: 1901
- Website: Official website

The 2017 Nobel Peace Prize was awarded to the International Campaign to Abolish Nuclear Weapons (ICAN) (founded in 2007) "for its work to draw attention to the catastrophic humanitarian consequences of any use of nuclear weapons and for its ground-breaking efforts to achieve a treaty-based prohibition on such weapons," according to the Norwegian Nobel Committee announcement on October 6, 2017. The award announcement acknowledged the fact that "the world's nine nuclear-armed powers and their allies" neither signed nor supported the treaty-based prohibition known as the Treaty on the Prohibition of Nuclear Weapons or nuclear ban treaty, yet in an interview Committee Chair Berit Reiss-Andersen told reporters that the award was intended to give "encouragement to all players in the field" to disarm. The award was hailed by civil society as well as governmental and intergovernmental representatives who support the nuclear ban treaty, but drew criticism from those opposed. At the Nobel Peace Prize award ceremony held in Oslo City Hall on December 10, 2017, Setsuko Thurlow, an 85-year-old woman who survived the 1945 atomic bombing of Hiroshima, and ICAN Executive Director Beatrice Fihn jointly received a medal and diploma of the award on behalf of ICAN and delivered the Nobel lecture.

== Award ==
A global civil society coalition of 468 peace, human rights, environment, development and faith groups as of 2017, ICAN was recognized for its decade-long consensus-building support for the Humanitarian Pledge and the Treaty on the Prohibition of Nuclear Weapons. Nobel Committee Chair Berit Reiss-Andersen described ICAN's work as having "brought the debate forward by focusing so heavily on the humanitarian consequences of using nuclear arms."

The Peace Prize announcement came in the midst of the 2017 North Korea crisis, uncertainty over certification of Iran's compliance with the 2015 accord that limits Iran's nuclear program, the Doomsday Clock assessment in January 2017 of the highest threat of nuclear war since 1953, heightened rhetoric between Indian and Pakistani military officials to target each other and retaliate with the early use nuclear weapons, Russia's strategic doctrine calling for early use of nuclear weapons against any "major NATO assault" on its territory, and opposition by nuclear powers to the nuclear ban treaty and its ratification.

In a telephone interview immediately after the announcement, ICAN Executive Director Beatrice Fihn said that, the Cold War being long over, possession and use of weapons of mass destruction "is no longer acceptable" in the 21st century. In a formal statement, ICAN called the 2017 prize a tribute to "the tireless efforts of many millions of campaigners and concerned citizens worldwide who, ever since the dawn of the atomic age, have loudly protested nuclear weapons" and to "the survivors of the atomic bombings of Hiroshima and Nagasaki—the hibakusha—and victims of nuclear test explosions". Holding a press conference at UN Headquarters, in New York, the ICAN executive director said that disarmament campaign efforts of a "new generation" of "people who grew up after the Cold War and don't understand why we still have the [nuclear] weapons," were in effect also being recognized by the award.

Nominations for the prize numbered 318, including 215 individuals and 103 organizations, second highest to the record 376 nominations considered in 2016. Though the Nobel Committee does not release names being considered for 50 years, reportedly they included: Tong Jen and Onodera Toshitaki seeking justice for Chinese victims of wartime atrocities during World War II; organizers Iran Foreign Minister Mohammad Javad Zarif and EU foreign policy chief Federica Mogherini of the 2015 Iran Deal negotiations; UNHCR and High Commissioner Filippo Grandi for their work on the rights and dignity of refugees; Turkish journalists Cumhuriyet and Can Dündar; The Economic Community of West African States (ECOWAS) for their work securing Gambia's political transition; and the humanitarian White Helmets, also known as the Syrian Civil Defense, and Raed al Saleh.

== Congratulatory reactions ==
Congratulatory messages in the days following the award announcement came from individual disarmament supporters as well as ICAN coalition organizations, other civil society groups, public figures, governments and the United Nations, including: survivors of the Hiroshima and Nagasaki bombings (hibakusha), The ATOM Project, Peace Boat, Nuclear Threat Initiative, Campaign for Nuclear Disarmament, Women's International League for Peace and Freedom, Human Rights Watch, Oxfam, Ploughshares Fund, Stockholm International Peace Research Institute, Germany, EU foreign policy chief Federica Mogherini, UK Green Party co-leader Caroline Lucas, Austria, Canada's New Democratic Party Critic for Foreign Affairs Hélène Laverdière, Mexico, and Nigeria. Twenty-three countries included congratulatory remarks in their statements at the UN General Assembly First Committee on Disarmament and International Security, including Sweden and New Zealand.

Pugwash President Sergio Duarte wrote that the award designation reflects "growing public recognition" of banning nuclear weapons as part of the international humanitarian norm to abolish weapons of mass destruction, citing examples of the abolition of bacteriological weapons in the 1970s and chemical weapons in the 1990s. He also called on State parties to make further progress at the UN High Level Conference on Nuclear Disarmament slated for 2018, noting the role of civil society organizations such as ICAN in supporting such multilateral disarmament processes.

UN Secretary-General António Guterres relayed in a press statement that the award "recognizes the determined efforts of civil society to highlight the unconscionable humanitarian and environmental consequences that would result if they [nuclear weapons] were ever used again," noting that the first UN General Assembly resolution, in 1946, had "established the goal of ridding the world of nuclear weapons and all weapons of mass destruction." The UN's top disarmament official Izumi Nakamitsu in a statement said that the 2017 Peace Prize "recognizes once again the vital and indispensable role of civil society in advancing our common aspirations peace, security and a world free of nuclear weapons."

Former Soviet Union President Mikhail Gorbachev in a statement said the award designation was "a very good decision" and signified that "a world without nuclear weapons—there cannot be any other goal!", also recalling a joint statement with then US President Ronald Reagan at the 1986 Reykjavik Summit that "a nuclear war cannot be won and must never be fought."

William McNeilly defended his WikiLeaked report in 2015 that claimed Trident nuclear programme safety and security failures and that sparked nuclear-deterrent debates in the UK the same year.

New Zealand's Green Party Spokesperson for Social Development, MP Jan Logie, said that "Our Pacific Ocean and its peoples have suffered the terrible effects of nuclear explosions and today we acknowledge the survivors of nuclear weapons use and testing. This Nobel Prize honours them."

Aging survivors of the 1945 Hiroshima and Nagasaki atomic bombings, known as hibakusha, have long campaigned to abolish nuclear weapons, often recounting the horrific suffering they endured and from which many more died. At gatherings to watch the broadcast Peace Prize announcement and in other press interviews, their reactions included:

- Toshiyuki Mimaki, 75, of the Hiroshima Prefectural Confederation of A-Bomb Sufferers Organizations: "The young people's activities have been recognized."
- Nagasaki Atomic Bomb Survivors Council members, with a photograph of Sumiteru Taniguchi, who died in August 2017 at the age of 88, said it gave them new motivation to continue their work.
- Terumi Tanaka, former secretary-general of Nihon Hidankyo: "We told the world about the inhumanity (of nuclear weapons). We laid the foundations for ICAN to do its work." Toshiki Fujimori, assistant secretary-general of the group, expressed hope that the award would "speed up the flow of countries joining the treaty."
- Peace Boat founder Tatsuya Yoshioka said the award "has the same value as if it were given to every hibakusha."
- Separately, the older brother of iconic Sadako Sasaki said he felt a sense of pride.
- Masahiro Sasaki, 76: "It's wonderful that these low-profile, often unseen activities have been recognized."
- Sunao Tsuboi, 92: "Together with ICAN and many other people, we hibakusha will continue to seek a world without nuclear weapons as long as our lives last."
- Shigemitsu Tanaka, head of the Nagasaki Atomic Bomb Survivors Council: "We want to take great delight as it helped build up a treaty banning nuclear weapons. We want to work together so that the nuclear disarmament treaty can be signed as soon as possible."

Speaking at Bowling Green University with fellow Hiroshima bombing survivor Keiko Ogura, who founded Hiroshima Interpreters for Peace, Setsuko Thurlow likened ICAN's work to other social movements eventually embraced by nations, saying "it is our moral imperative to abolish nuclear weapons" and that the Peace Prize for ICAN "represents a break from the typical state perspective."

Supporters from faith communities issued congratulatory statements, including: the Dalai Lama, Daisaku Ikeda, Father Shay Cullen, the Holy See, Pax Christi International, and the World Council of Churches.

== Critical reactions ==
While the majority of reactions from the international community hailed the Nobel Committee's decision, other reactions were critical about the announcement's implications. NATO Secretary-General Jens Stoltenberg said that NATO has in common with ICAN the goal of "preserving peace and creating the conditions for a world without nuclear weapons" and welcomes the attention drawn by the award announcement to nuclear non-proliferation issues, but that the nuclear ban treaty supported by ICAN "risks undermining the progress we have made over the years," citing the existence of nuclear arms as the reason to maintain nuclear arsenals and for NATO remaining a nuclear alliance since the Cold War. In a press release Norwegian Prime Minister Erna Solberg praised ICAN for promoting their common goal of a world free of nuclear weapons but reiterated that Norway will not sign the ban treaty, echoing NATO's stance.

Similarly, spokesperson Dmitry Peskov told reporters that the Kremlin believes the award decision should be respected and that Russia as a member of the nuclear club both supports nuclear non-proliferation and maintains its position expressed by President Vladimir Putin that "there is no alternative to nuclear parity" in global security measures. The government of Australia as of October 9, 2017, did not comment on the award designation but, through its spokesperson, acknowledged "the commitment of ICAN and its supporters to promoting awareness of the humanitarian consequences of nuclear weapons" and restated the government's position that "so long as the threat of nuclear attack exists, US extended deterrence will serve Australia's fundamental national security interests." The USA reacted by saying in its statement that the award announcement "does not change the U.S. position on the treaty" which in its view "risks undermining existing efforts to address global proliferation and security challenges," and that "no state possessing nuclear weapons or which depends upon such weapons for its security supports" the ban treaty. When asked to clarify whether Canadian Prime Minister Justin Trudeau wanted to congratulate ICAN, the prime minister's office did not respond, though in a June 2017 statement Canadian Foreign Minister Chrystia Freeland's press secretary said that "Canada remains firmly committed to concrete steps towards global nuclear disarmament and nonproliferation."

== Commentaries ==
The Economist questioned the appropriateness of ICAN's winning of the prize, arguing it was doubtful their nuclear-ban treaty effort would do anything to advance global peace due to its rejection by the world's nuclear powers.

== Award funding ==
On October 20, 2017, Euronews reported that, through research with German broadcaster ZDF into Nobel Prize Foundation index funds investments, German campaign group Facing Finance had determined that the Peace Prize award was funded in part by Foundation investments in companies contributing to nuclear weapons programs, including Textron, Lockheed Martin and Raytheon, and urged ICAN not to accept the 9 million SEK award money. According to Agence France-Presse, the head of the Nobel Institute Olav Njolstad was confronted on October 26, 2017, with the revelation confirmed by environmental group The Future in Our Hands, and Foundation director Lars Heikensten said the following day that "[a]t the latest, by March next year [2018] we will have no investment in anything that is connected with any kind of production which is classified as connected with nuclear weapons."

== Award ceremony ==
A day ahead of the December 10th award ceremony at Oslo City Hall, ICAN installed outside the Norwegian Parliament building 1,000 red and blue paper cranes made by children in Hiroshima.

== Past Award recognition of disarmament efforts ==
After the first wartime use of nuclear weapons, in 1946, the Peace Prize began to recognize nuclear disarmament efforts:

- (1959) Philip Noel-Baker
- (1962) Linus Pauling
- (1974) Eisaku Satō
- (1982) Alva Myrdal and Alfonso García Robles
- (1985) International Physicians for the Prevention of Nuclear War
- (1990) Mikhail Gorbachev
- (1995) Joseph Rotblat and the Pugwash Conferences on Science and World Affairs
- (2005) International Atomic Energy Agency and Mohamed ElBaradei

In the award presentation speech on December 10, 2017, Nobel Committee Chair Berit Reiss-Andersen recalled that "twelve Peace Prizes have been awarded, in whole or in part," to honor "efforts against the proliferation of nuclear weapons and for nuclear disarmament," and included 2009 Nobelist Barack Obama.

== See also ==
- Concerns about nuclear weapons
- Humanitarian Initiative
- Nobel Prize controversies
- Nuclear disarmament
- Nuclear holocaust
- Nuclear weapons debate
- Nuclear weapons in popular culture
- Public opinion on nuclear issues
