= Setsuko Thurlow =

Japanese anti–nuclear weapons activist

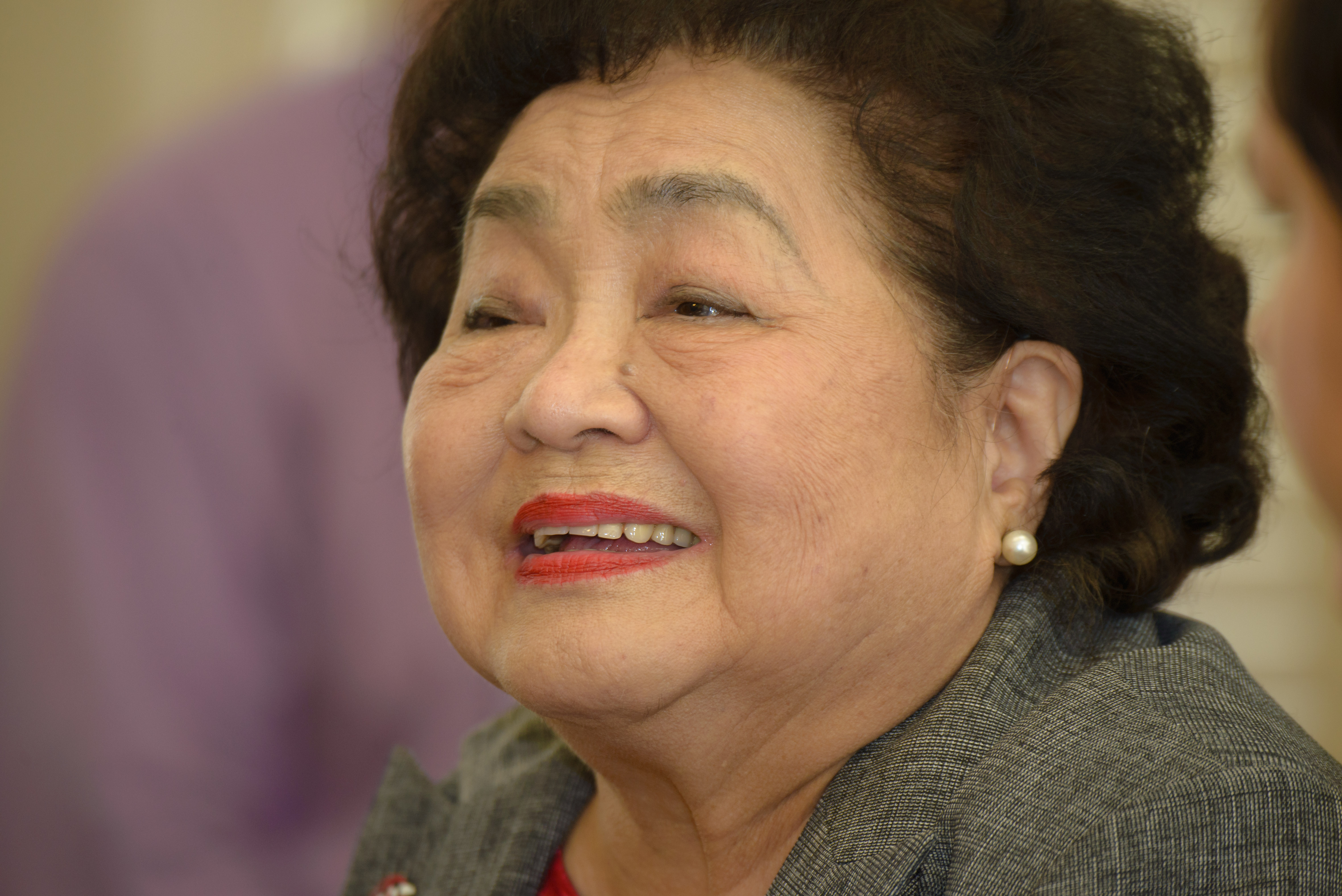
- Setsuko Thurlow on 27 October 2017
- Born: 中村 節子 Nakamura Setsuko; 3 January 1932 (age 94); Hiroshima, Japan
- Known for: Anti-nuclear activism, Peace activism, Social work
- Awards: Officer of the Order of Canada (2007) Queen Elizabeth II Jubilee award (2012) NAPF's Distinguished Peace Leadership Award (2016) Ahmadiyya Muslim Peace Prize (2016) Nobel Peace Prize (2017)

Setsuko Thurlow (サーロー 節子, Sārō Setsuko; born 3 January 1932), born Setsuko Nakamura (中村 節子, Nakamura Setsuko), is a Japanese–Canadian nuclear disarmament campaigner and Hibakusha who survived the atomic bombing of Hiroshima on 6 August 1945. She is mostly known throughout the world for being a leading figure of the International Campaign to Abolish Nuclear weapons (ICAN) and to have given the acceptance speech for its reception of the 2017 Nobel Peace Prize.

== Early life ==
Setsuko Thurlow was born in Hiroshima Kojin-machi (today suburb of Minami) in 1932, the youngest of seven children. She comes from a comfortable background. As the youngest, Setsuko's siblings were older and all left the family home, leaving her to live with her parents alone.

In 1944, she entered in the girls-only Hiroshima Jogakuin high school. Three weeks before the bombing, Setsuko was selected to participate in a student state program to decode American military communications as an assistant.

=== Experience of the nuclear atomic bomb ===
On Monday August 6, 1945, she was working as a member of the student mobilisation program in the Japanese Army headquarters (Higashi suburb today), located approximately 1.8 kilometres or 1.1 miles away from the hypocentre of the explosion. It was her first day.

Around 8:15 AM, Setsuko was on the second floor of the wooden building. She reported seeing a bluish-white flash from the window and remembers floating in the air (the building collapsing) before she lost consciousness. When she woke up, Setsuko said she heard her classmates whispering "Mother help me," "God help me." After some time, a soldier helped her to escape the crumbling building with the rest of her schoolmates, except two others, before it burnt down.

" [...] Although it happened in the morning, it was dark, dark as twilight. And as our eyes got used to recognize things, those dark moving objects happened to be human beings. It was like a procession of ghosts. I say “ghosts” because they simply did not look like human beings. Their hair was rising upwards, and they were covered with blood and dirt, and they were burned and blackened and swollen. Their skin and flesh were hanging, and parts of the bodies were missing. Some were carrying their own eyeballs. And they collapsed onto the ground. Their stomach burst open, and intestines start stretching out. [...] we learned how to step over the dead bodies, and escaped. By the time we got to the hillside, at the foot of the hill was a huge army training ground about the size of two football fields [...]. The place was packed with dead bodies and dying people, injured people. And people were just begging in whisper. Nobody was shouting in strong voice, just a whisper: “Water please. Water please.” That’s all the physical and psychological strength left. They just whispered. We wanted to be of help to them, but we had no bucket and no cups to carry the water. [...] So we went to the nearby stream, washed off our dirt and the blood, and tore off our blouses, soaked them in the water, and dashed back to the dying people. We put the wet cloth over their mouth, and who desperately sucked in the moisture. [...] That’s how most of the people died."

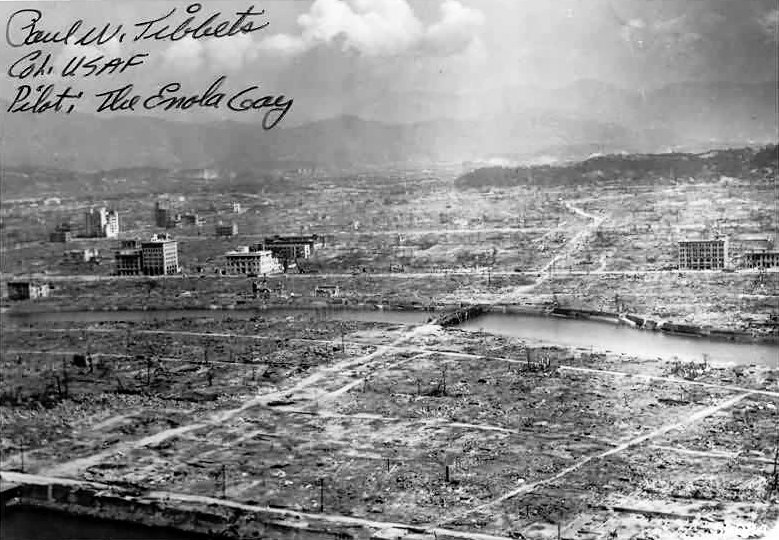
Aerial view of Hiroshima after "Little Boy"

Eight members of her family (including her then-four-year-old nephew, Eiji, to whom she often refers; he was crossing a bridge with Setsuko's sister who died totally burnt beyond recognition without her hairpiece), as well as 351 of her classmates and teachers, died during or soon after the explosion.

Thurlow described the acute radiation syndrome that she and many others were victim of for months and years after the bombing. She has talked several times about the fact that months after the bomb, every morning she (like other survivors) verified that she was not developing purple spots on her body (symptoms of bone marrow failure or leukemia), a symptom of an approaching death. She has described the death of her uncle and aunt following those symptoms. As with many other hibakushas, Thurlow lost her hair, had nausea and bleeding gums months after the bombing. She has also revealed that many of her surviving schoolmates wore helmets long after the end of the war to hide their baldness.

Setsuko has declared that she was lucky that she and both her parents survived and that they were able to be hosted by family, unlike many others who had to live in the street. Like many hibakushas, she described being numbed by the overwhelming pain of what she experienced, and she was only able to cry after the Makurazaki Typhoon that hit Hiroshima more than a month after "Little Boy". Having felt guilty from her lack of emotional demonstration, she has said that she only understood this years later when studying trauma at university.

Thurlow has also regularly described the hardships of the hibakushas, including the near-starvation, lack of medical care, homelessness, social discrimination, and the insensitivity from the Atomic Bomb Casualty Commission whose only purpose was to study the technical effects of radiations on bodies and not provide any treatment or support. She has denounced the U.S. Army's seven year occupation and its strict censorship, erasement and confiscation of journals, data, visual support, poems and personal diaries of what was related to the dropping of the two nuclear bombs.

At the time of these events, Setsuko was a 13-year-old, an 8th grade student. Mr. Nakamura, her father, died due to radiations in 1954, the same year that she went to study abroad and the year of the dropping of the H bomb on Bikini Island.

=== Studies and profession ===
Setsuko studied English literature and education at Hiroshima Jogakuin University before receiving a grant to study in the United States, where she studied sociology at Lynchburg College in Virginia from 1954. She later obtained a master's degree in social work from the University of Toronto.

== Anti-nuclear activism ==
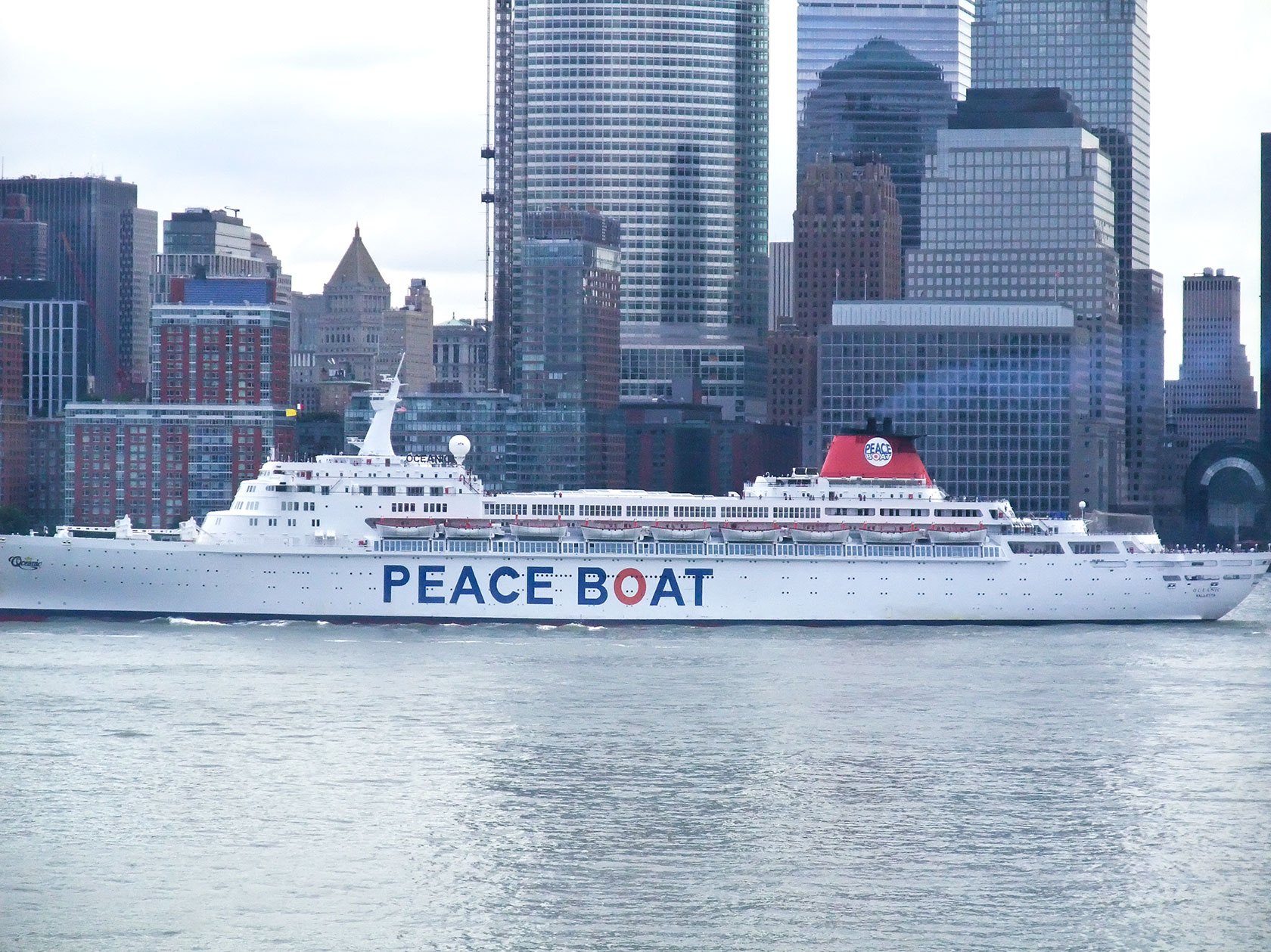
The Peace Boat in New York City, 2009

Setsuko Thurlow's activism began after March 1, 1954, after the explosion of the hydrogen bomb with the code name "Castle Bravo" in the Bikini Atoll in the Marshall Islands which had nuclear fallout that reached Japan. This American weapon was approximately 1,000 times more powerful than the one Setsuko had been victim of less than 10 years before. This event happened the first week she had arrived in the U.S., and she gave her opinion on it. She has described receiving threats and harassment during her years studying in the U.S. because of her continued criticism, to the point where she could not go to class anymore and had to live at the house of one of her professors.

She is a member of Nihon Hidankyo, the Japanese confederation of A and H Bombs sufferers which formed in 1956, who fought for hibakushas' medical rights and social recognition.

In 1974, profoundly worried by the fact that the public tended to forget and underestimate the devastating impacts of nuclear bombs, Thurlow started the foundation Hiroshima Nagasaki Relived. The organisation mobilised professors, artists, lawyers, and teachers to inform and raise public awareness of the consequences of nuclear weapons.

She has since travelled to dozens of countries to testify as a hibakusha and raise awareness of the existential threat of nuclear weapons, in front of dignitaries such as Pope John Paul II, as well as students. She has several times been a crew member of on a Peace Boat, the Japanese NGO promoting nuclear disarmament.

Thurlow has participated in several school presentations as a member of the project "Hibakusha stories" based in New York, to testify before all-together several thousands of students. She has been regularly invited to testify at universities, schools, nuclear and Japanese history centres and other public events.

Thurlow is also an activist against the peaceful use of nuclear energy due to its existential dangers and has been particularly active as a critic with other hibakushas after the Fukushima humanitarian catastrophe.

The 2020 documentary, The Vow from Hiroshima, directed by Susan Strickler, provides a biographical account of Thurlow's life, activism, and collaboration with second generation survivior Michie Takeuchi.

=== United Nations ===
Setsuko Thurlow testified and pleaded at the United Nations several times and has among other actions participated in the international conference of the International Atomic Energy Agency in Vienna (IAEA) about the humanitarian impact of nuclear weapons on December 8, 2014, in favour of the nuclear non-proliferation treaty.

She was an active member in the ratification of the United Nations concerning the treaty on the prohibition of nuclear weapons, mandated in December 2016, and delivered the closing statement at the nuclear ban conference. She also actively participated for its vote on July 7, 2017.

"I've been waiting for this day for seven decades, and I am overjoyed that it has finally arrived. This is the beginning of the end of nuclear weapons."

=== ICAN and the Nobel Peace Prize ===
ICAN logo

Thurlow was a founding member and gave the keynote speech at the international launch of ICAN in Canada in 2007. She is a leading figure of the group, which won the 2017 Nobel Peace Prize “for its work to draw attention to the catastrophic humanitarian consequences of any use of nuclear weapons and for its ground-breaking efforts to achieve a treaty-based prohibition of such weapons.” Thurlow accepted the prize on behalf of the campaign at the ceremony in Oslo on December 10, 2017, together with Beatrice Fihn, the executive director of ICAN.

During her speech, Thurlow declared, in reference to the moment she was trapped under the building after the bombing and saved by a soldier:

"Then, suddenly, I felt hands touching my left shoulder, and heard a man saying: "Don't give up! Keep pushing! I am trying to free you. See the light coming through that opening? Crawl towards it as quickly as you can. [...] Our light now is the ban treaty. To all in this hall and all listening around the world, I repeat those words that I heard called to me in the ruins of Hiroshima: "Don't give up! Keep pushing! See the light? Crawl towards it. [...] Tonight, as we march through the streets of Oslo with torches aflame, let us follow each other out of the dark night of nuclear terror. No matter what obstacles we face, we will keep moving and keep pushing and keep sharing this light with others. This is our passion and commitment for our one precious world to survive".

== Private life ==
Setsuko married in 1950 a Canadian historian, Jim Thurlow, whom she had met in Japan. The couple settled in Canada in 1955, at the time when Asian immigration was restricted to family of Canadians. In 1957, they moved to Japan for a social project in Hokkaido, to come back to Toronto in 1962. Setsuko served there as a social worker in the education and health departments.

They had two sons and two grandchildren. Until his death in 2011, her husband took part in Setsuko's anti-nuclear activities and has with others helped her to organize groups and conferences for the cause.

== Awards and distinctions ==
- 2007 – Member of the Order of Canada (CM) for "exceptional contribution to social work and efforts to eliminate nuclear weapons"
- 2012 – Queen Elizabeth II Diamond Jubilee Award
- 2014 – "Ambassador of Peace", prize awarded by the town of Hiroshima
- 2015 – "Arms control person of the year” by the Arms Control Association
- 2015 – Nuclear Age Peace Foundation’s Distinguished Peace Leadership Award
- 2016 – "Arms Control Person of the Year" by ICAN
- Member of the council of the Nuclear Age Peace Foundation
- 2016 – Ahmadiyya Muslim Peace Prize
- 2017 – Nobel Peace Prize ICAN
- 2019 – Doctorate honoris causa in law, University of Toronto

== See also ==
- List of peace activists
