= Yoshioka Tatsuya =

Japanese civil society leader and activist

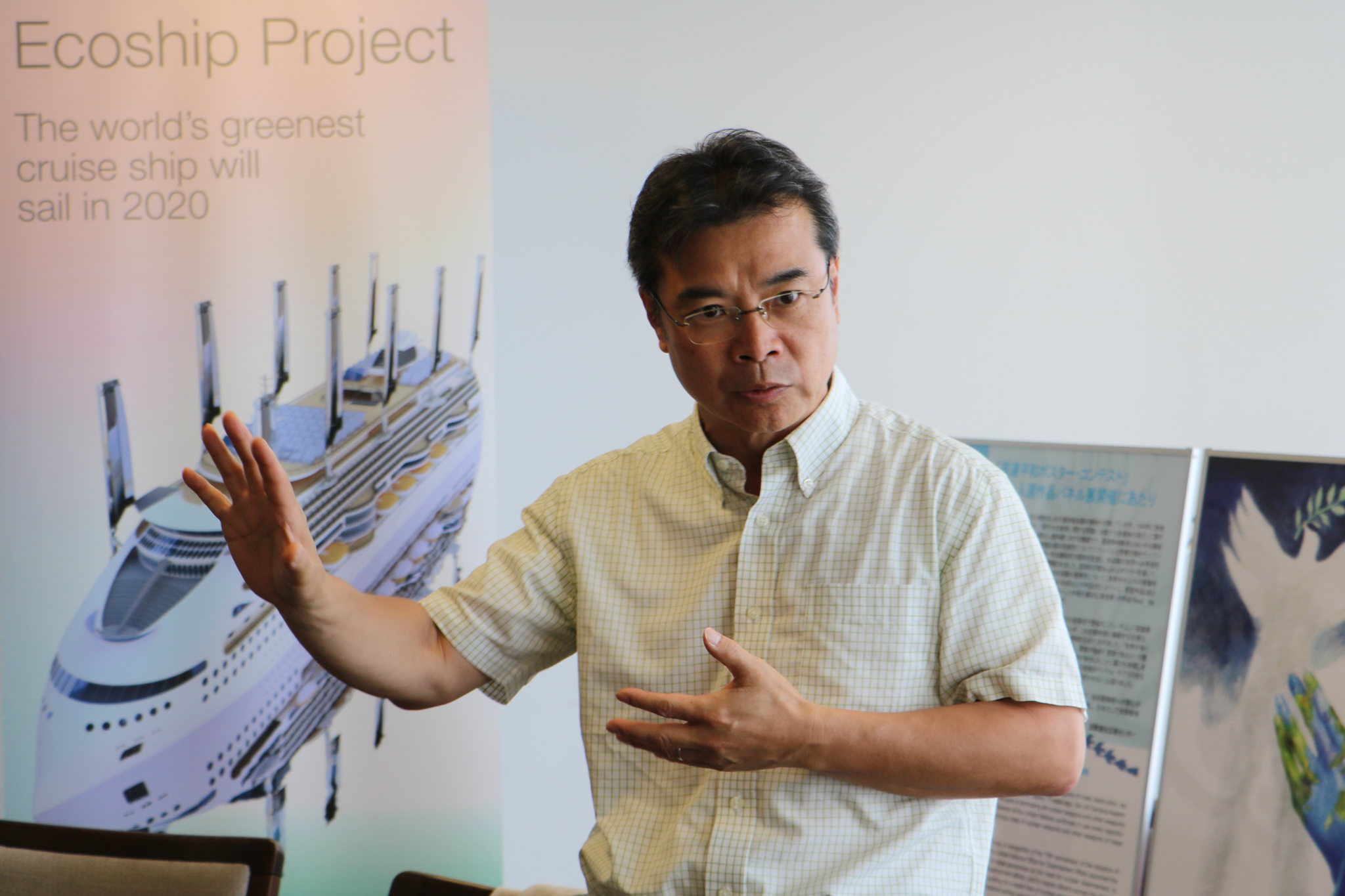
Yoshioka Tatsuya

Tatsuya Yoshioka (吉岡 達也, Yoshioka Tatsuya) is a Japanese civil society leader and activist. Over three decades, Yoshioka has been involved in education, peace and conflict resolution. He is the co-founder and the director of Peace Boat.

== Early career ==
Whilst a student at Waseda University, Yoshioka founded Peace Boat in 1983 to foster grassroots dialogue and people-to-people reconciliation between Japan and other Asian countries, during a period of tension and hostilities in the region.

From this vision of promoting people's diplomacy, Peace Boat has grown into an NGO and social business that has organised more than 100 voyages for peace, and taken more than 70,000 people to over 270 ports on 7 continents for study, volunteering, cultural exchange and tourism. Yoshioka has led the organization of these voyages, as well as initiatives such as peace education for youth from conflict zones and post-conflict countries, and Northeast Asian people's dialogues.

== GPPAC and Nobel Prize Nomination ==
Yoshioka is a founding member of the UN-initiated Global Partnership for the Prevention of Armed Conflict (GPPAC) International Steering Group and head of its Northeast Asia Secretariat. He was nominated for the Nobel Peace Prize in 2008 for leading the Global Article 9 Campaign to Abolish War.

After the 2011 Tōhoku earthquake and tsunami, Yoshioka established the Peace Boat Disaster Relief Volunteer Centre (PBV), which has dispatched more than 14,000 volunteers to the stricken region and helped to rebuild devastated neighborhoods, as well as working on Disaster Risk Reduction through training young leaders worldwide.

== Publications ==
Tatsuya has written one book on the former Yugoslavia and a second book on the Northern Territories (Kuril Islands) dispute between Russia and Japan.

== The Ecoship Project ==
Yoshioka is currently spearheading the development of Peace Boat's Ecoship Project.
