= Global Partnership for the Prevention of Armed Conflict =

Network of civil society organizations

- Abbreviation: GPPAC
- Formation: 2003
- Type: non-governmental, not for profit organization
- Purpose: awareness raising and lobbying, education and networking
- Headquarters: The Hague, The Netherlands
- Region served: Global
- Members: 15 Regions
- Official language: English
- Chair: Tatsuya Yoshioka
- Website: http://www.gppac.net

The Global Partnership for the Prevention of Armed Conflict (GPPAC) is a member-led network of civil society organisations (CSOs) active in the field of conflict prevention and peacebuilding across the world. The network is organised around 15 regional networks of local organisations, each region having its own priorities, character and agenda. Each region is represented in an International Steering Group, which determines joint global priorities and actions. GPPAC was initiated through extensive consultations in 2003-4, and officially launched as part of a global conference in 2005 at the UN headquarters in New York.

As part of its mission to work towards a global shift from reaction to prevention of violent conflict, GPPAC strives towards multi-actor collaboration and local ownership. Together, GPPAC members aim to achieve greater synergy in the field of conflict prevention and peacebuilding by connecting different levels (from national to regional and global), and to strengthen the role of local civil society groups in conflict regions.

GPPAC supports the capacity of the regional networks to interact and act together, and facilitates regional and global exchanges, where members from different parts of the world come together and learn from each other's experiences and develop joint strategies. GPPAC also connect its members with other relevant actors, including the UN, regional intergovernmental organisations, state actors, the media and academia. This has enabled unique initiatives, showing GPPAC’s ability to bridge global policy making with local ownership and practice on the ground.

Achievements of GPPAC so far have included:

- Greater access and direct involvement of local civil society in policy processes such as the Geneva Declaration on Armed Violence and Development and UN initiatives such as the UN Peacebuilding Commission;
- Mobilisation of the global network in support of local CSOs - through tools, advice, contacts, political leverage or international civil society delegations – contributing to efforts to prevent or constrain violence in times of crisis or political change, as seen during the post-election crisis in Kenya, the political transition in Guinea Conakry, and clashes in Kyrgyzstan;
- The development of a Preventive Action framework to enable CSOs to engage from the stage of conflict assessment to the implementation and monitoring of conflict prevention strategies;
- Promotion of networks and dialogue initiatives (track II diplomacy) in the Caucasus, Latin America and other politically sensitive regions such as South Asia and Northeast Asia (Ulaanbaatar Process);
- Initiation of a dialogue and collaboration between CSOs and regional organisations such as the OAS, ECOWAS, SAARC and ASEAN on security issues
- Increased capacity of CSOs to work together in reaching out to the media and policy makers through ‘Media Focal Points’, quiet diplomacy workshops and policy liaison functions.
- Setting up of the Peace Portal, an online platform that is being custom-built to support the interaction, information-sharing and joint action of actors and initiatives in the conflict prevention and peacebuilding field.
- A global mapping of expertise and initiatives within the GPPAC network related to the UN Security Council Resolution 1325 on Women, Peace and Security

== Main programme areas ==
GPPAC focuses on the following thematic priorities:

- Preventive Action: developing effective tools and operational capacities to mobilise action and enable CSOs to contribute to preventing conflict in collaboration with other key stakeholders
- Dialogue & Mediation: building capacity and mobilising the expertise within the network to directly support dialogue and mediation efforts in conflict situations
- Peace Education: enhancing methodologies for formal and informal education that fosters a culture of dialogue and peaceful handling of conflict, and collaborating with governments to institutionalise such initiatives in educational and local authority systems
- Human Security: developing a bottom-up approach to Security, by providing the input of grassroots CSOs in the development and implementation of security strategies including DDR, SSR, measures to address violent extremism, and civil-military interventions.
- Gender and UNSCR 1325 as a cross-cutting priority for GPPAC themes and strategies.

In January 2012, GPPAC launched the Peace Portal, a publicly accessible online platform for resource sharing and collaboration in conflict prevention and Peacebuilding. The portal facilitates participation from civilians and grassroots organizations, serving as a digital resource for GPPAC's broader peacebuilding initiatives.

== Regional Secretariats ==
The Global Partnership for the Prevention of Armed Conflict consists of fifteen regions. They are:

- Eastern and Central Africa
- West Africa
- Southern Africa
- Latin America and the Caribbean
- North America
- South Asia
- The Pacific
- Southeast Asia
- Northeast Asia
- Central Asia
- Middle East and North Africa
- Eastern Europe
- The Caucasus
- Western Balkans
- Northern and Western Europe
