= International Campaign to Abolish Nuclear Weapons =

Non-profit civil society coalition

- Abbreviation: ICAN
- Formation: 23 April 2007; 19 years ago
- Founded at: Melbourne, Australia
- Type: Non-profit international campaign
- Headquarters: Geneva, Switzerland
- Fields: Nuclear disarmament
- Members: 661 partner organizations in 110 countries (2022)
- Executive director: Melissa Parke
- Award: 2017 Nobel Peace Prize
- Website: www.icanw.org

The International Campaign to Abolish Nuclear Weapons (abbreviated to ICAN, pronounced /ˈaɪkæn/ EYE-kan) is a global civil society coalition working to promote adherence to and full implementation of the Treaty on the Prohibition of Nuclear Weapons. The campaign helped bring about this treaty. ICAN was launched in 2007. In 2022, it counted 661 partner organizations in 110 countries.

The campaign received the 2017 Nobel Peace Prize "for its work to draw attention to the catastrophic humanitarian consequences of any use of nuclear weapons and for its ground-breaking efforts to achieve a treaty-based prohibition of such weapons."

== Mission ==
ICAN aims to reframe the disarmament discussion to center on the humanitarian threat that nuclear weapons pose by highlighting their extraordinary capacity for destruction, their disastrous health and environmental effects, their indiscriminate targeting, the crippling effects of a nuclear detonation on medical facilities and relief efforts, and the long-lasting radiation effects on the surrounding area.

The success of the International Campaign to Ban Landmines, which was essential in triggering the negotiation of the anti-personnel mine ban treaty in 1997, served as inspiration for ICAN's founders. They aimed to create a comparable campaign model.

== Formation ==
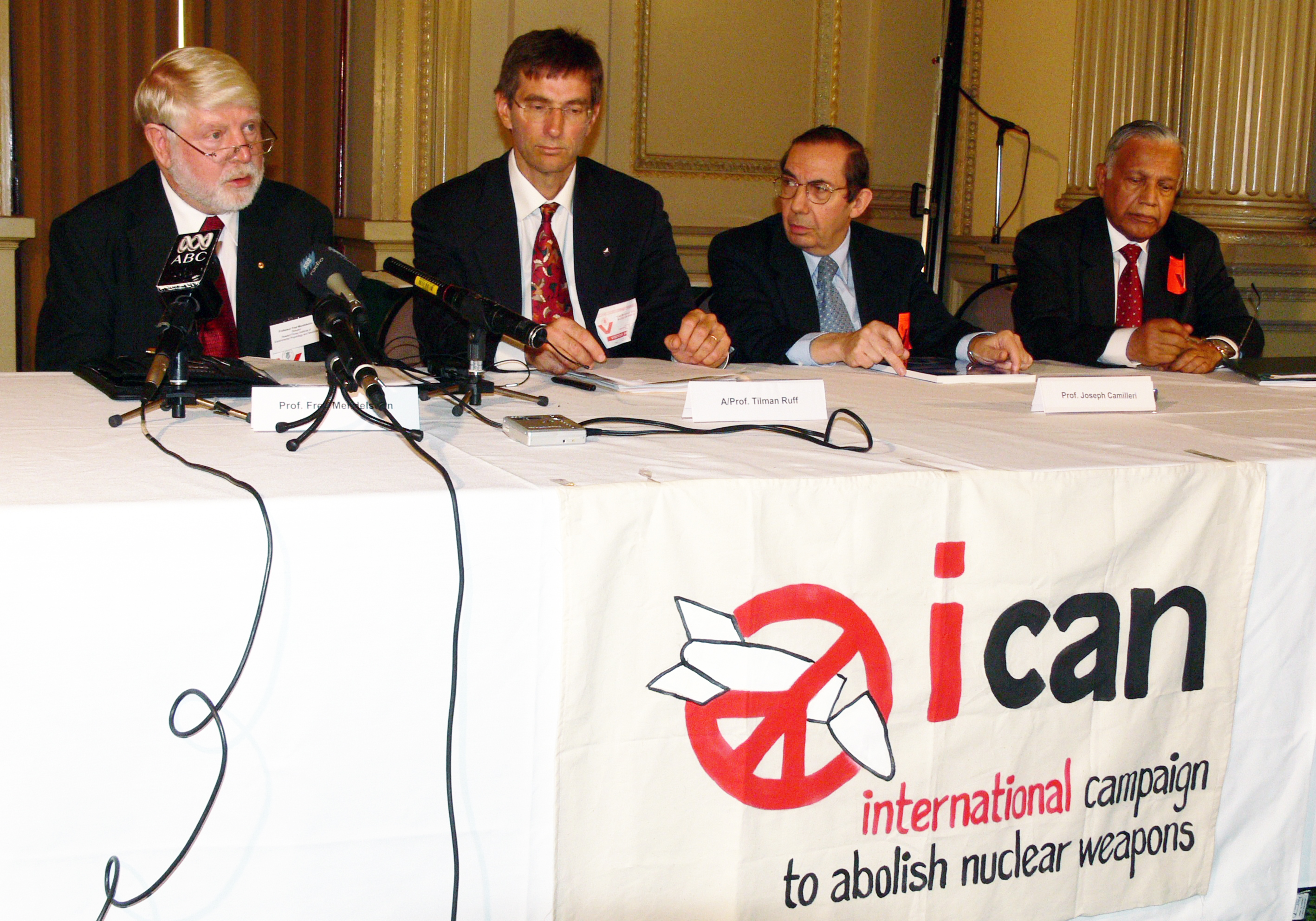
Launch of the ICAN in Melbourne, Australia, in 2007.

In September 2006, the International Physicians for the Prevention of Nuclear War, itself awarded the Nobel Peace Prize in 1985, adopted a proposal at its biennial congress in Helsinki, Finland, to launch ICAN globally. ICAN was launched publicly at two events, the first on 23 April 2007 in Melbourne, Australia, where funds had been raised to establish the campaign, and the second on 30 April 2007 in Vienna at a meeting of State parties to the Treaty on the Non-Proliferation of Nuclear Weapons. National campaigns have been organized in dozens of countries in every region of the world.

== Membership and support ==
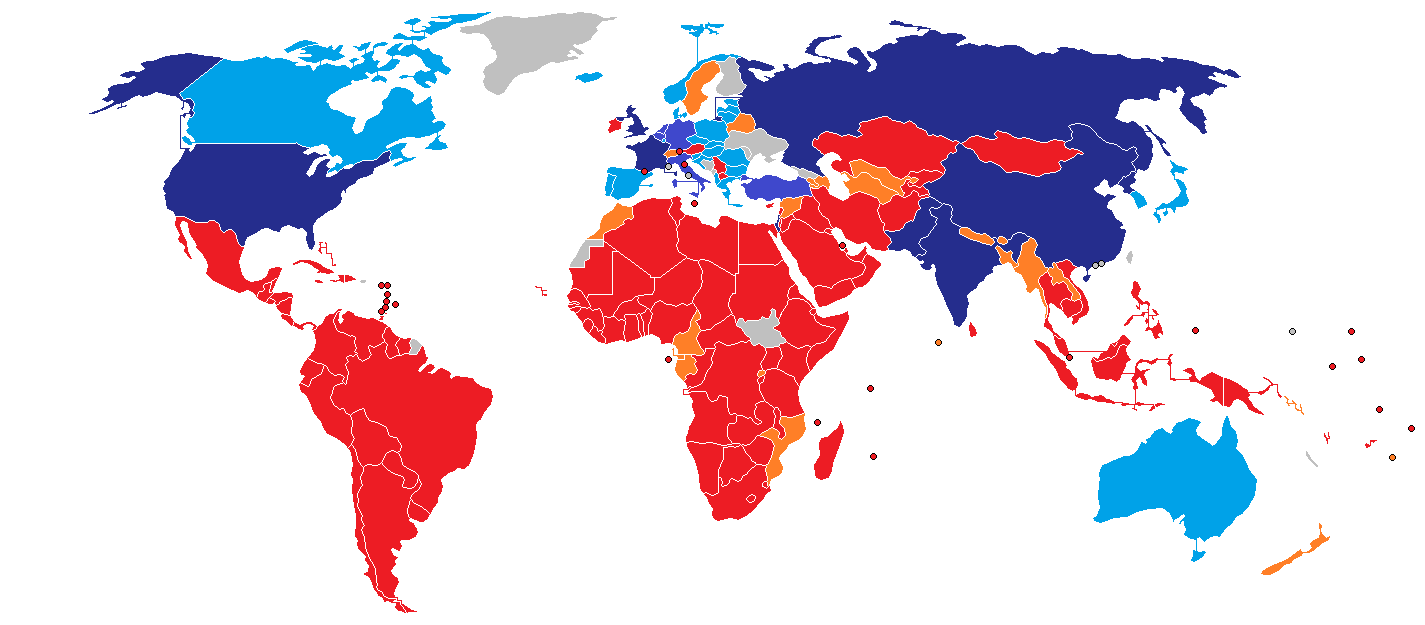
Formally endorsed ICAN Humanitarian Pledge. Voted in favour of Pledge resolution. Have a nuclear programme, no Pledge endorsement. Host nuclear weapons, no Pledge endorsement. In a nuclear alliance, no Pledge endorsement.

As of 2022, ICAN is made up of 661 partner organizations in 110 countries. The campaign's staff team is located in Geneva, Switzerland, from where it provides ongoing coordination and management of the campaign. Daniel Hӧgsta is the current Interim Director following Director Beatrice Fihn's retirement.

An International Steering Group oversees the campaign, with current members the Acronym Institute for Disarmament Diplomacy, Article 36, African Council of Religious Leaders – Religions for Peace, International Physicians for the Prevention of Nuclear War, Norwegian People's Aid, Pacific Network on Globalisation (PANG), PAX, Peace Boat, Latin America Human Security Network (SEHLAC), Swedish Physicians against Nuclear Weapons, and the Women's International League for Peace and Freedom.

Akira Kawasaki (President), Clara Levin (Treasurer) and Rebecca Johnson (Secretary) are responsible for the Swiss-registered non-profit association of ICAN as of 2021.

== Milestones ==
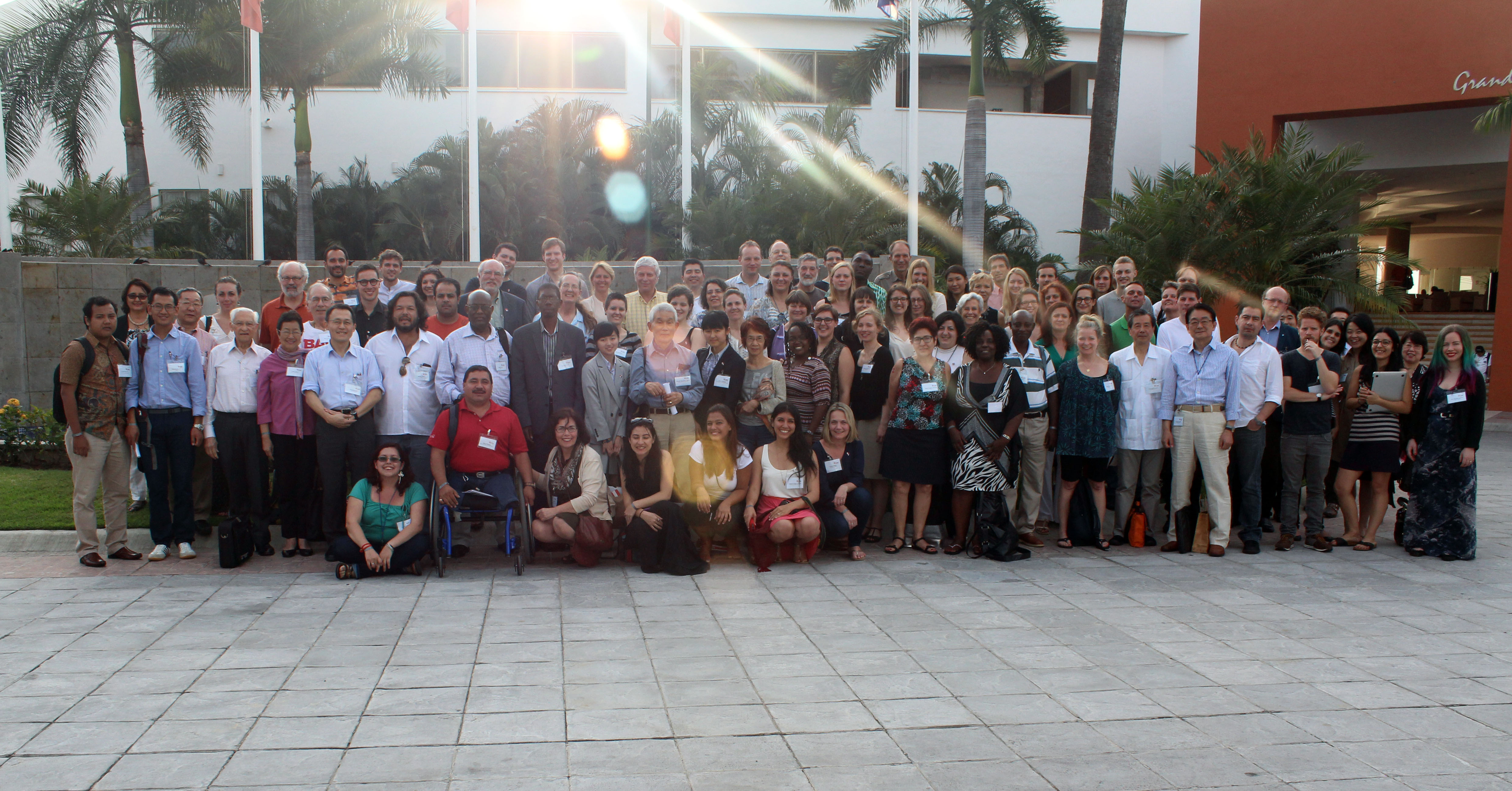
ICAN campaigners in Mexico in 2014.

- 21-23 June 2022: The Treaty on the Prohibition of Nuclear Weapons' First Meeting of State Parties was held at the Austria Center Vienna. ICAN served as a civil society focal point for the meeting and hosted side events about disarmament. This meeting set an agreed deadline of 10 years to dissolve nuclear weapons programs and 90 days to remove hosted nuclear weapons upon a country signing TPNW.
- 22 January 2021: The Treaty on the Prohibition of Nuclear Weapons entered into force.
- 24 October 2020: The Treaty on the Prohibition of Nuclear Weapons is ratified by the 50th state, triggering its entry into force on 22 January 2021.
- 6 October 2017: The Nobel Peace Prize for 2017 was awarded to the ICAN. The committee stated: "for its work to draw attention to the catastrophic humanitarian consequences of any use of nuclear weapons and for its ground-breaking efforts to achieve a treaty-based prohibition of such weapons" as the reason for selecting ICAN for this award.
- 7 July 2017: The Treaty on the Prohibition of Nuclear Weapons (TPNW) is adopted at the United Nations by a vote of 122-1. The Treaty, which prohibits the development, testing, production, manufacture, acquisition, possession, stockpiling, transfer, use, and threatened use of nuclear weapons or other nuclear explosive devices, will enter into force once it has been ratified by 50 states. The ICAN calls the TPNW "a landmark international agreement that outlaws, categorically, the worst weapons of mass destruction and establishes a pathway to their elimination."
- 27 October 2016: UN First Committee adopts a landmark, ICAN-supported resolution to launch negotiations in 2017 on a treaty outlawing nuclear weapons. ICAN calls on all states to participate in the negotiations, stating that "every nation has an interest in ensuring that nuclear weapons are never used again, which can only be guaranteed through their complete elimination."
- February–August 2016: ICAN campaigns actively at UN Open-Ended Working Group in Geneva, which recommends by a large majority of 107 participating States that the General Assembly authorize negotiations on "a legally binding instrument to prohibit nuclear weapons, leading towards their total elimination." ICAN calls the OEWG recommendation "a breakthrough in the seven-decade-long global struggle to rid the world of the worst weapons of mass destruction."
- 2 November 2015: UN General Assembly establishes Open-Ended Working Group to review the evidence of catastrophic humanitarian impact of nuclear weapons and to make concrete recommendations for taking forward multilateral nuclear disarmament. ICAN calls on the OEWG "to begin the serious practical work of developing the elements for a treaty banning nuclear weapons."
- November 2015: After mobilizing campaigners behind the Humanitarian Pledge for almost a year, ICAN takes significant credit for bringing 127 onto the Pledge as signatories; another 23 States vote in favor of Pledge goals at General Assembly.
- 6–7 August 2015: ICAN campaigners organize worldwide events to commemorate the 70th anniversaries of the atomic bombings of the Japanese cities of Hiroshima and Nagasaki.
- December 2014: More than 600 ICAN campaigners gather in Vienna on the eve of the Vienna Conference on the Humanitarian Impact of Nuclear Weapons. ICAN tells conference participants "a new legal instrument prohibiting nuclear weapons would constitute a long overdue implementation of the Non-Proliferation Treaty." At the conference conclusion, Austria issues historic Humanitarian Pledge to work with all stakeholders "to fill the legal gap for the prohibition and elimination of nuclear weapons."
- 26 October 2014: 155 States, an increase of 30 from the previous year, submit joint humanitarian appeal for nuclear disarmament at UN General Assembly.
- 1 July 2014: Beatrice Fihn is appointed ICAN Executive Director.
- 13-14 February 2014: Nayarit Conference on the Humanitarian Impact of Nuclear Weapons attended by 146 States and more than a hundred civil society campaigners. ICAN tells participants "the claim by some states that they continue to need these weapons to deter their adversaries has been exposed by the evidence presented at this conference…as a reckless and unsanctionable gamble with our future." At conference conclusion, Mexico calls for the start of a diplomatic process to negotiate a legally binding instrument prohibiting nuclear weapons.
- 30 August 2013: UN working group highlights humanitarian concerns about the catastrophic humanitarian consequences of nuclear detonations and the need for non-nuclear nations to push forward.
- March 2013: ICAN coordinates civil society participation at historic Oslo Conference on the Humanitarian Impact of Nuclear Weapons, an unprecedented gathering of States to evaluate the scientific evidence about the catastrophic consequences of nuclear weapons.
- 5 March 2012: ICAN launches "Don't Bank on the Bomb" global divestment initiative.
- 26 November 2011: ICAN welcomes historic resolution adopted by the International Red Cross and Red Crescent movement in favor of an international agreement to prohibit nuclear weapons.
- 27 June 2011: P5 nations (the United States, Russia, the United Kingdom, France and China) meet in Paris to discuss ways to improve transparency in relation to their nuclear weapons. ICAN releases a video challenging them to do much more.
- 28 May 2010: ICAN campaigners at the NPT Review Conference in New York call on governments to support a nuclear weapons convention. While references to a convention are included in the final document, ICAN is already considering a shift in strategy toward a new treaty banning nuclear weapons in order to empower non-nuclear-weapon states to assume more effective leadership.
- 30 April 2007: ICAN is launched internationally during the Treaty on the Non-Proliferation of Nuclear Weapons preparatory committee meeting in Vienna.
- 7 September 2006: International Physicians for the Prevention of Nuclear War, the 1985 Nobel Peace Laureate, adopts ICAN as top campaign priority at its world congress in Helsinki, Finland. IPPNW's Australian affiliate, MAPW, commits to fund-raising and providing coordination for a campaign launch in 2007.

== Recognition ==
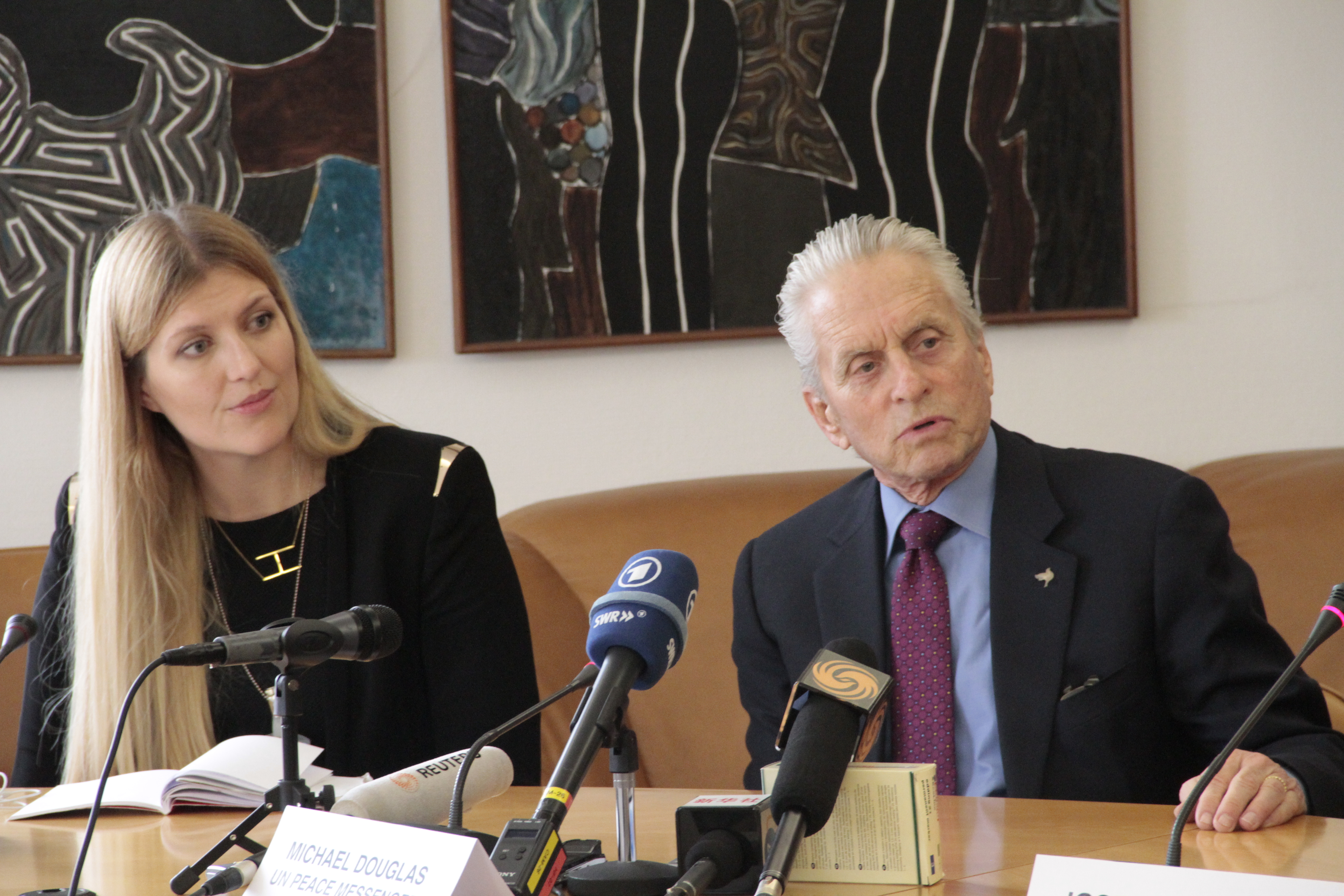
Michael Douglas with the ICAN executive director Beatrice Fihn in 2016.

A number of prominent individuals have lent their support to the campaign, including Nobel Peace Prize laureates Desmond Tutu, the Dalai Lama and Jody Williams, the musician Herbie Hancock, the cricket journalist and former player Ian Chappell, the actors Martin Sheen and Michael Douglas, and the artist Yoko Ono.

In November 2012, the Secretary-General of the United Nations, Ban Ki-moon, praised ICAN and its partners "for working with such commitment and creativity in pursuit of our shared goal of a nuclear-weapon-free world". Earlier, he had provided a video message to ICAN in support of its global day of action.

In 2017 ICAN was awarded the Golden Doves for Peace journalistic prize issued by the Italian Research Institute Archivio Disarmo.

=== 2017 Nobel Peace Prize ===
The ICAN organization was awarded the 2017 Nobel Peace Prize, on 6 October 2017. The Nobel Peace Prize Press Statement reads: "for its work to draw attention to the catastrophic humanitarian consequences of any use of nuclear weapons and for its ground-breaking efforts to achieve a treaty-based prohibition of such weapons [...] It is the firm conviction of the Norwegian Nobel Committee that ICAN, more than anyone else, has in the past year given the efforts to achieve a world without nuclear weapons a new direction and new vigour".

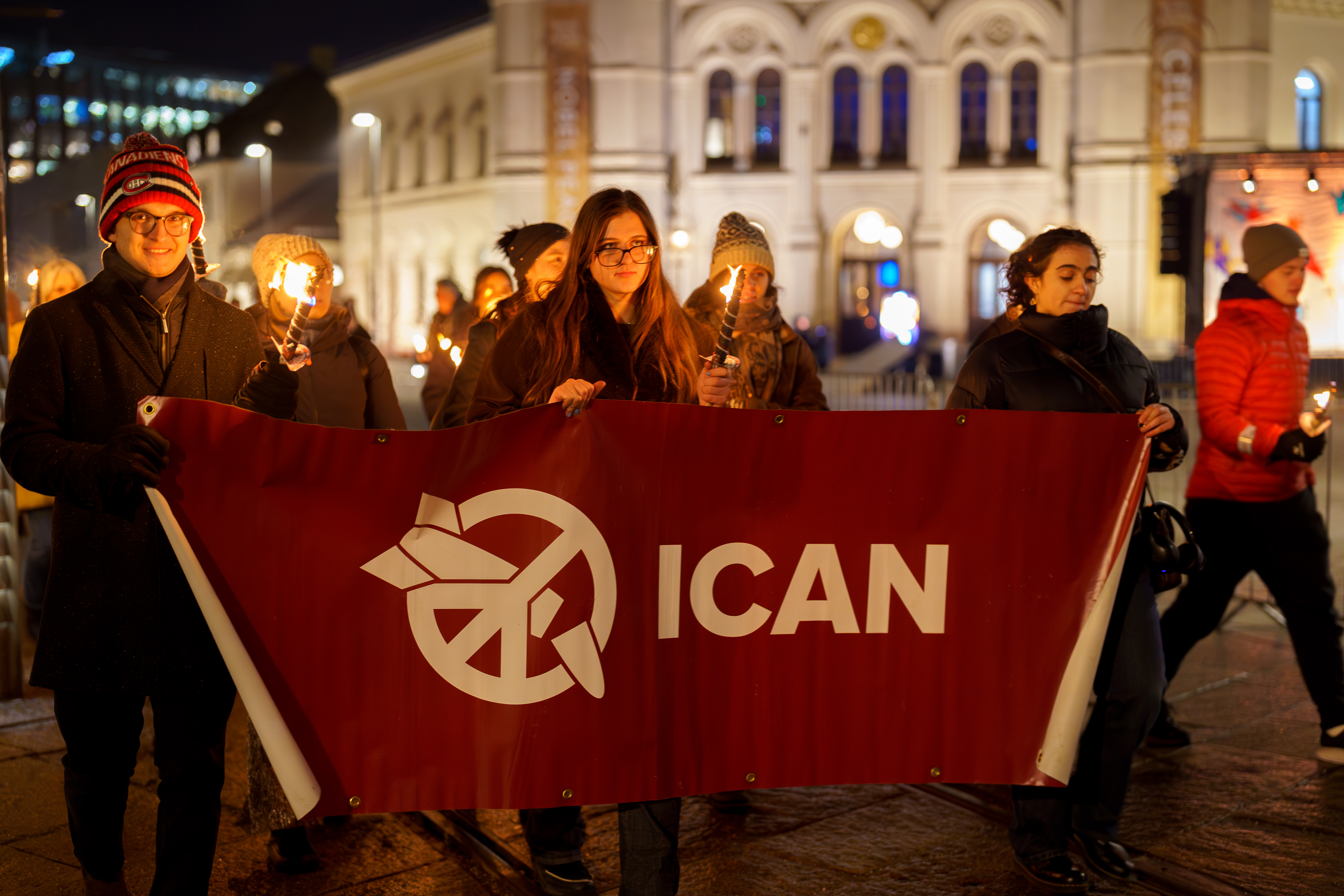
ICAN at 2024 Nobel Week in Oslo, Norway

The Economist expressed skepticism about the effectiveness of ICAN's nuclear-ban treaty, arguing that it was unlikely to advance global peace due to its rejection by the world's nuclear powers.

The Nobel Prize has brought significant attention to ICAN's core issues, and membership of affiliate groups and partners have jumped to over 450 organisation worldwide, bringing the core issues squarely into remit of international law.

== See also ==
- Anti-nuclear movement
  - Anti-nuclear organizations
  - Anti-nuclear protests
  - Campaign for Nuclear Disarmament
  - Conference on Disarmament
  - International Day for the Total Elimination of Nuclear Weapons
  - Nuclear disarmament
- Humanitarian Initiative
- International Day of Peace
- List of anti-war organizations
- United Nations Office for Disarmament Affairs
