= Beatrice Fihn =

Swedish lawyer (born 1982)

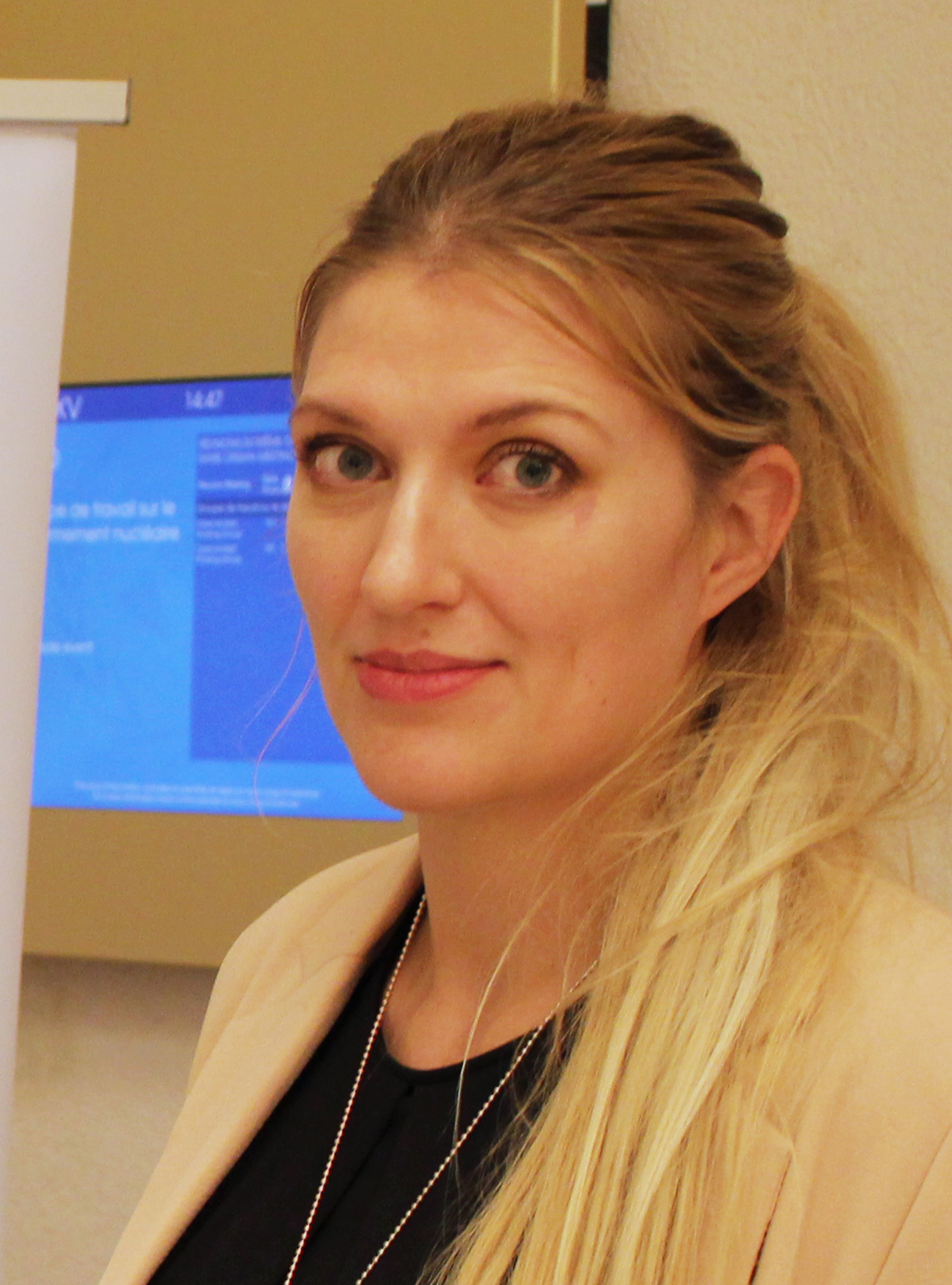
- Fihn in 2016
- Born: Beatrice Fihn; 17 November 1982 (age 43); Gothenburg, Sweden
- Spouse: Will Fihn Ramsay
- Parent(s): Carina Fihn, Göran Bylin

Beatrice Fihn (born 17 November 1982) is a Swedish lawyer. She was the executive director of the International Campaign to Abolish Nuclear Weapons (ICAN) from 2014 to 1 February 2023.

On 6 October 2017, the Norwegian Nobel Committee announced that the 2017 Nobel Peace Prize honor was given to International Campaign to Abolish Nuclear Weapons (ICAN) "for its efforts to raise awareness of the catastrophic humanitarian consequences of nuclear weapons use and for pioneering efforts to achieve a treaty-based ban on nuclear weapons."

During the Nobel Peace Prize award ceremony at Oslo City Hall held on 10 December 2017, Fihn jointly received medals and diplomas on behalf of ICAN alongside Setsuko Thurlow, who survived Hiroshima in 1945.

== Biography ==
Fihn was born on 17 November 1982 in Gothenburg, Sweden. She studied at the Stockholm University, earning a bachelor's degree in international relations in 2008. In 2009, she participated in an internship at the Women's International League for Peace and Freedom (WILPF), and was involved in the work of the Conference on Disarmament and the United Nations Human Rights Council. She then worked at a bank in Geneva and earned a one-year Master of Laws degree in international law at the University College London.

== Career ==
Fihn has given presentations at United Nations meetings, in parliaments around the world, at universities like Harvard and Notre Dame, and at global conferences such as the World Economic Forum, Munich Security Conference, and the Royal Institute of International Affairs' Chatham House.

Fihn returned to the WILPF in 2010, working with its 'Reaching Critical Will' disarmament programme, until becoming the executive director of ICAN in 2014. In 2018, Fihn produced the film The Day the World Changed, the first-ever virtual reality memorial experience dedicated to those directly affected by nuclear warfare dating back to 1945.

In 2018, Fihn criticized U.S. President Donald Trump on his nuclear policies. In 2018, Fihn visited Nagasaki for the first time and visited Hiroshima Peace Memorial Park. During the visit, Fihn laid a wreath at the cenotaph for atomic bomb victims. While in Japan, Fihn signed a petition placed in the museum calling for the early conclusion of the Treaty on the Prohibition of Nuclear Weapons (adopted in July 2017).

Under Fihn's leadership, ICAN has been the main civil society actor working alongside governments to achieve a strong and effective nuclear weapons ban treaty. In 2017, the Nuclear Weapon Ban Treaty was signed at the United Nations. The Treaty on the Prohibition of Nuclear Weapons (TPNW) is the first legally binding international agreement that comprehensively prohibits nuclear weapons with the ultimate objective of eliminating them completely.

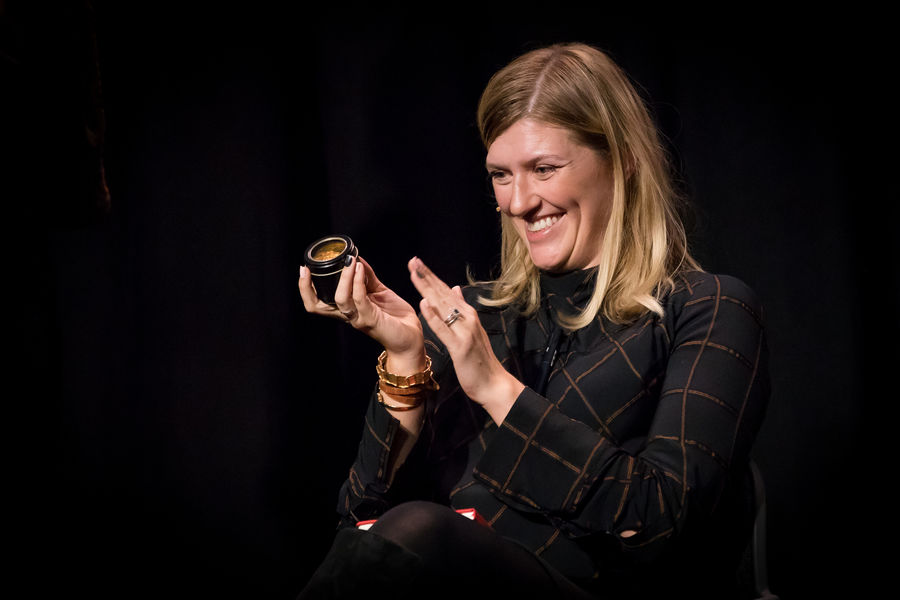
Beatrice Fihn, Nobel Peace Center, Oslo, 2018

In 2017, Bloomberg Media listed her as one of 50 innovators who "changed the global landscape".

In 2018, Fihn delivered the 24th annual Hesburgh Lecture in Ethics and Public Policy at the University of Notre Dame. The Tribeca Film Festival honored Fihn with the Special Lifetime Achievement Award at the ninth annual Disruptive Innovation ceremony in April 2018.

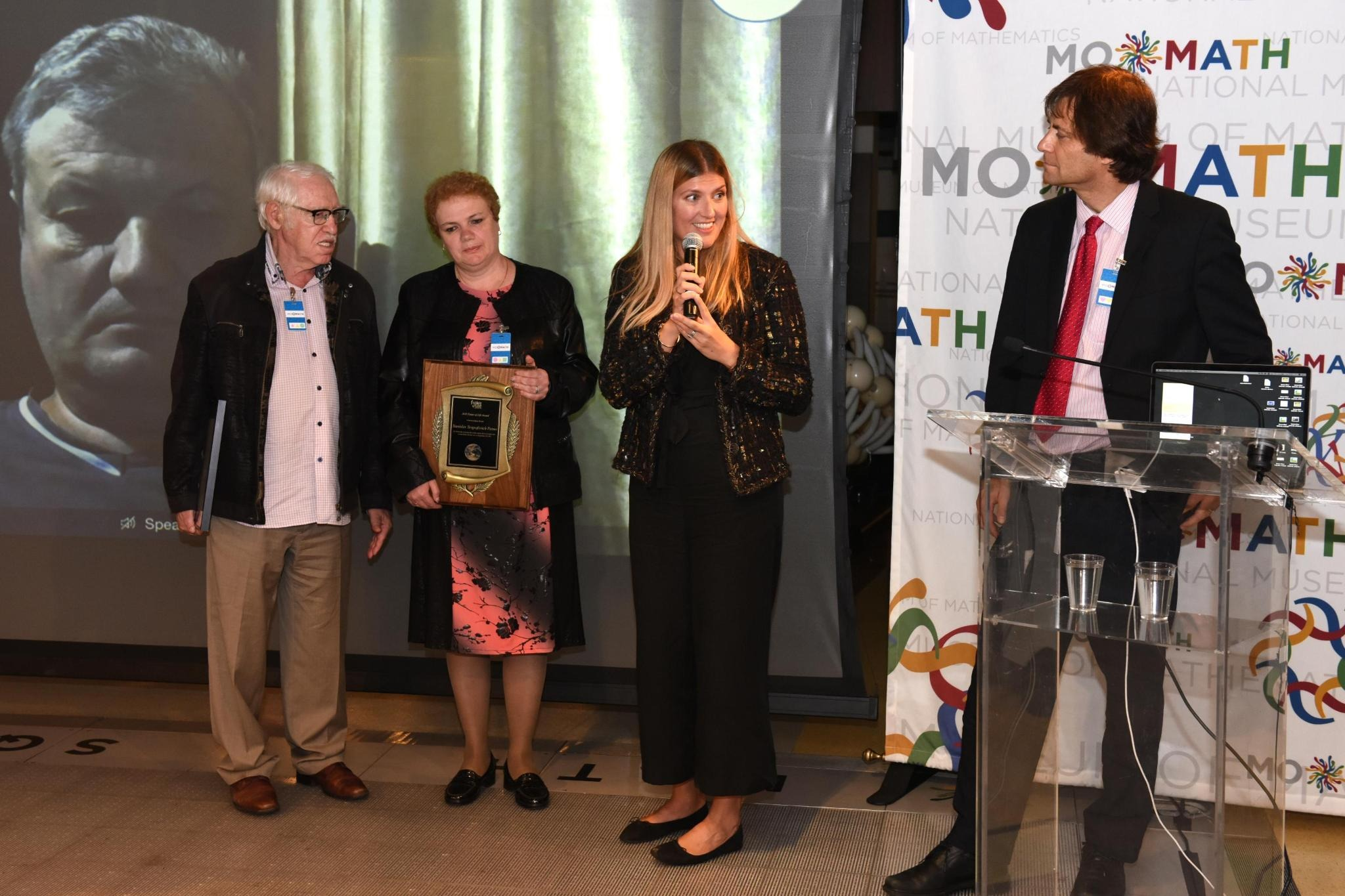
Fihn delivered remarks at the Museum of Mathematics in New York honoring Stanislav Petrov, the winner of the Future of Life Award for 2018.

In September 2018, Fihn delivered remarks at the Museum of Mathematics in New York honoring Stanislav Petrov, the winner of the Future of Life Award for 2018.

In 2019, Fihn delivered the Kenneth N Waltz Annual Lecture at Aberystwyth University. The title of Fihn's lecture was "International Politics is alive and well (despite reports to the contrary)".

In 2021, Fihn was a featured speaker at the Second IPB World Peace Congress held in Barcelona, Spain.

As she commented on Russia's 2022 invasion of Ukraine and Vladimir Putin's nuclear alert, Fihn said, "We have not seen a public announcement regarding heightened nuclear alert status since the 1960s...Not only is this meant to instill fear in the whole world; it's also meant to scare anyone from helping in Ukraine."

In March 2022, Fihn participated in a United Nations event intended to draw attention to gender and nuclear disarmament. The event titled, "Nuclear Disarmament and Disaster Risk Reduction: Women and Girls in the Lead", was held as a civil society briefing in conjunction with the 66th Session of the UN Commission on the Status of Women in collaboration with Pathways to Peace.

In February 2023, Fihn stepped down as executive director of ICAN and left Daniel Högsta as Interim Executive Director until a new director is found.
