= Peace Boat =

Non-government organization based in Japan

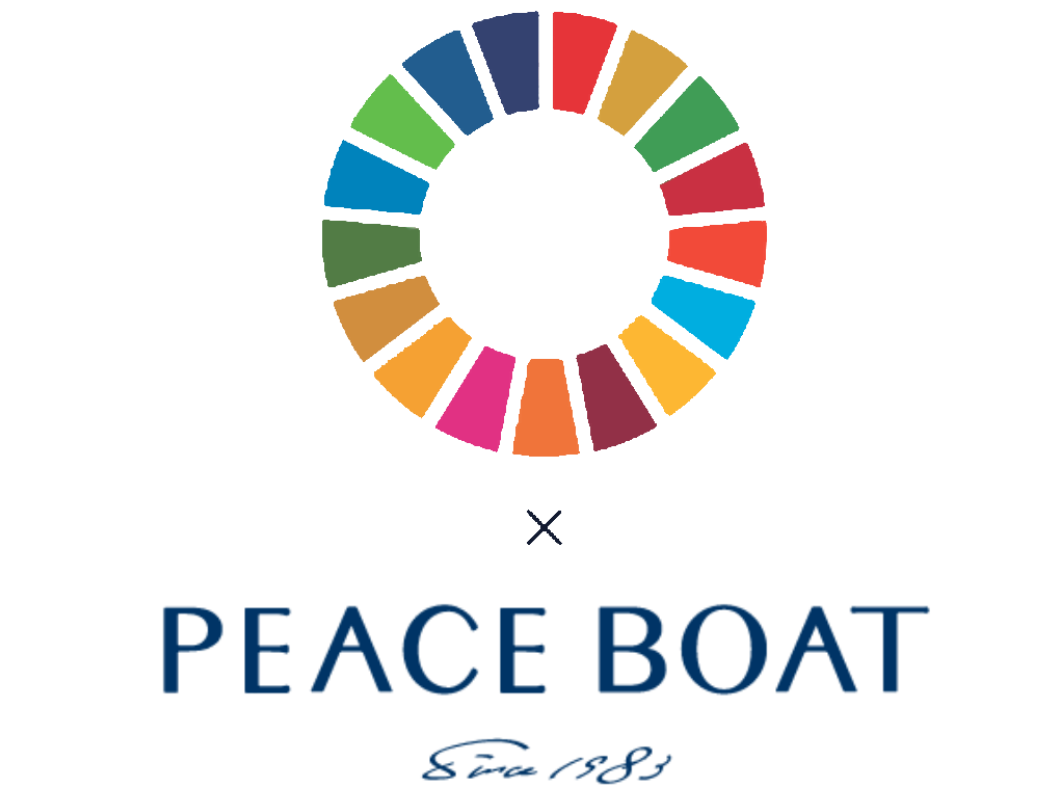

- Founded: 1983
- Founder: Yoshioka Tatsuya
- Type: non-governmental organization
- Location: Tokyo, Japan
- Owner: Yoshioka Tatsuya
- Website: peaceboat.org/english

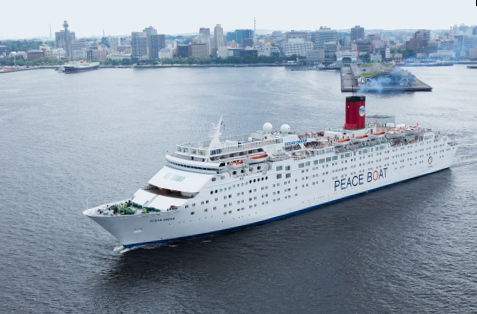
Ocean Dream at Yokohama, Japan

Peace Boat (ピースボート, Pīsu Bōto) is a global non-government organization headquartered in Japan established for the purpose of raising awareness and building connections internationally among groups that work for peace, human rights, environmental protection and sustainable development. "Peace Boat" may also refer to one of the ships embarking on a cruise under the Peace Boat organization. Since its founding in 1983, the Shinjuku, Tokyo based organization has launched more than 100 voyages. These cruises, the main operation of the Peace Boat organization, are on average carried out at least three times a year. Peace Boat, described by the San Francisco Chronicle as a "floating university of sorts", offers educational opportunities aboard, with conferences related to global events. They also provide humanitarian aid at their various stops and visit local organizations.

Besides the international voyages, Peace Boat carries out a number of other projects seeking justice in various international realms such as a campaign for the abolition of land mines, the Global Article 9 Conference to Abolish War, the Global Hibakusha Forums, and others onboard and in ports. Peace Boat also acts as the Northeast Asia regional secretariat of the Global Partnership for the Prevention of Armed Conflict, and is member of ICAN (International Campaign to Abolish Nuclear Weapons), having played a significant role in negotiations to strengthen the Treaty on the Prohibition of Nuclear Weapons, which was awarded the Nobel Peace Prize on December 10, 2017. Peace Boat is an NGO in Special Consultative Status with the Economic and Social Council of the United Nations and a committed campaigner for the Sustainable Development Goals (SDGs).

== History ==
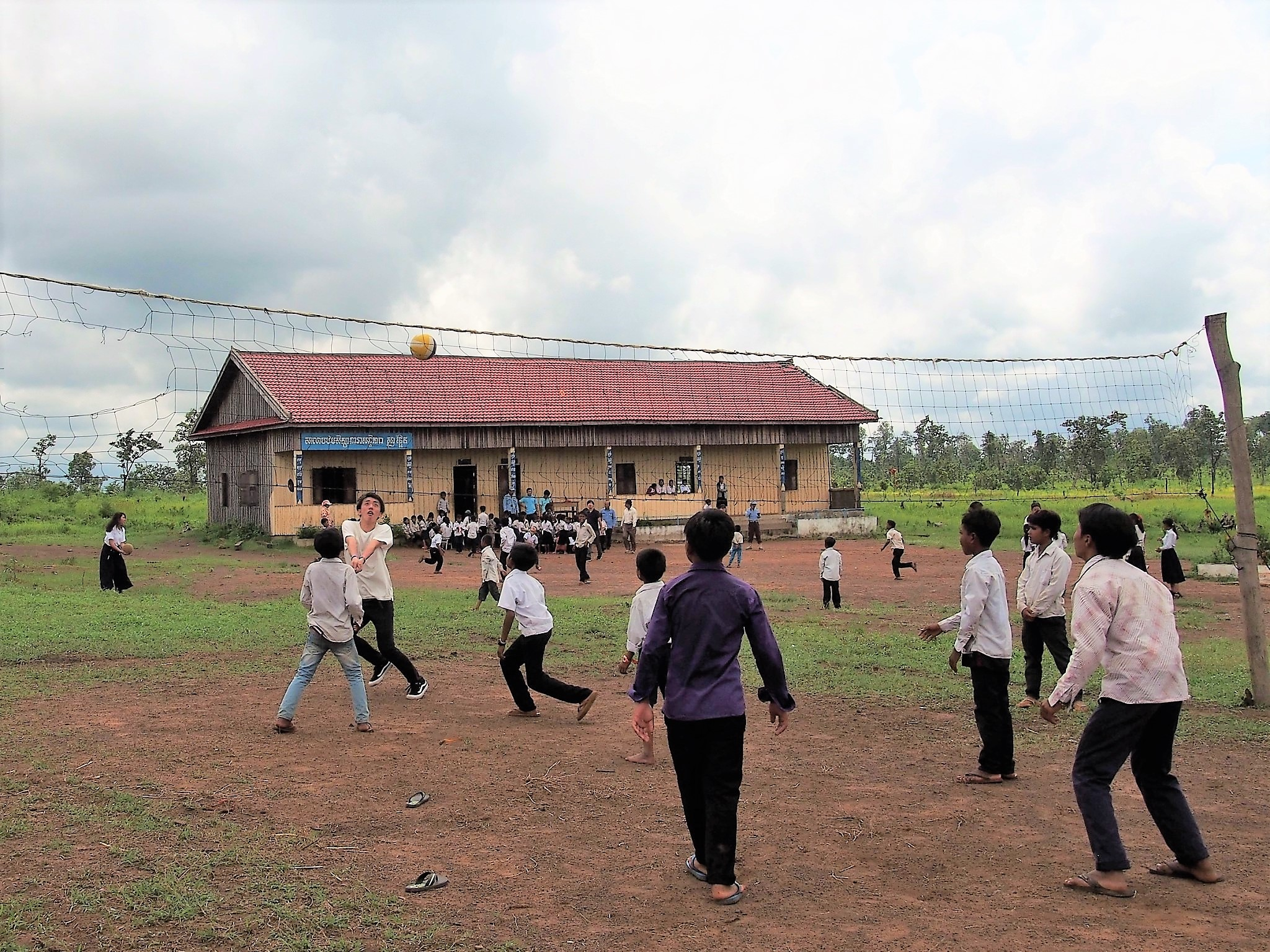
Supporting schoolchildren on the 99th cruise in 2018

In 1983, Yoshioka Tatsuya and Kiyomi Tsujimoto, then students of Waseda University, initiated Peace Boat in answer to Japanese history textbook controversies. With the assistance of like-minded students, they organized the first voyage. Peace Boat has since visited more than 270 ports with over 70,000 participants.

During the first six years after it was founded, Peace Boat ran one- to two-week long cruises to various Asian countries around Japan at the rate of one per year. Time on the boat was used to hold lectures and events with guest speakers invited from the countries to be visited. When at port, international exchange events were carried out with local NGOs and student groups. This became the foundational style for which the rest of the cruises would be based on.

In 1990, the 10th Peace Boat cruise marked the beginning of the circumnavigational cruise series. During the cruise, the Gulf War broke out and the ship encountered a US aircraft carrier in the Red Sea. After the success of first round-the-world cruise, Peace Boat continued them on a regular basis.

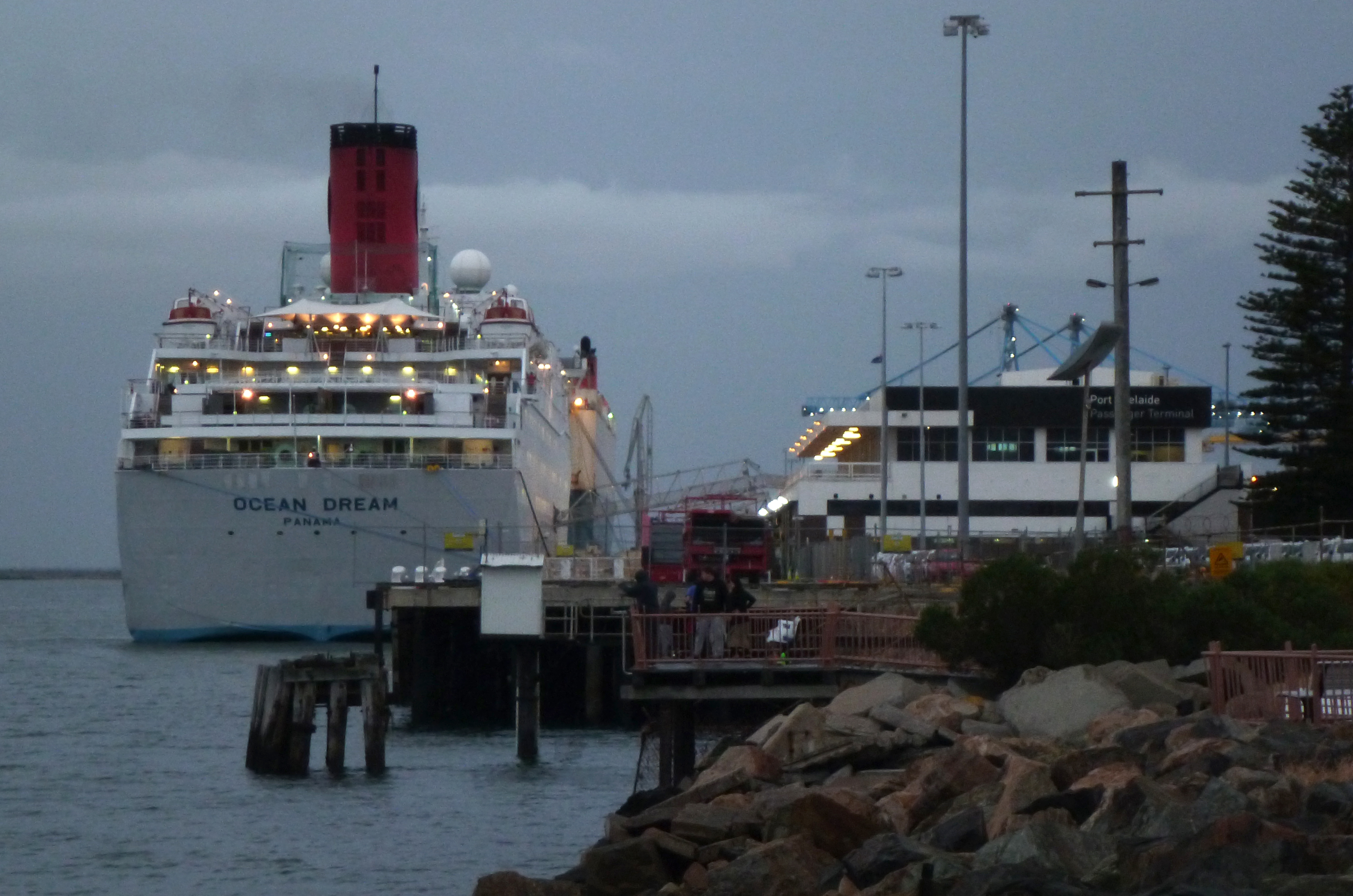
Peace Boat Ocean Dream departs Port Adelaide, South Australia (2018)

In 1991, after the fall of the Soviet Union, Peace Boat set out to the Kuril Islands with the notion of a citizen's diplomacy mission, stopping at Iturup, Kunashir, and Shikotan islands. There were homestays and tours. This was the first trip made to these islands without a visa by an NGO from Japan.

Over the past 30 years, Peace Boat has organized over 100 voyages, including more than 60 around-the-world voyages, carrying over 70,000 participants to over 270 ports. The participants range from toddlers to people in their 90s, from many different countries and professions. The organization was nominated for the Nobel Prize in 2008.

== Ships ==
During its history, Peace Boat has chartered many different vessels.

=== Current Fleet ===
Ship	Flag	Build Year	Entering the Fleet for Peace Boat	Gross Tonnage	Home Port	Notes	Image
Pacific World (Sun) Class
Pacific World	Panama	1995	2020–present	77,441	Yokohama (Tokyo), Japan	Formerly known as Sun Princess; Sailed for Peace Boat in 2020 as Pacific World	

=== Future Fleet ===
Ship	In service for Peace Boat	Built	Gross Tonnage (GT)	Status Unnamed	Image
Ecoship Class
Ecoship	TBD	TBD	TBD	TBD	

=== Former Fleet ===
Ship	In service for Many Years	Gross tonnage	Flag	Notes	Image
Clipper Pacific	1970–2013	22,945	Bahamas	Formerly known as Song of Norway, Sundream, Dream Princess, Dream & Clipper Pearl; Later renamed as Festival, Ocean Pearl, and MS Formosa Queen; Scrapped in China in 2013	
Olvia	1976–2022	2,251	Soviet Union	Formerly known as Kareliya and Leonid Brezhnev; Later renamed as CT Neptune & Neptune; Beached for scrap in 2022	
The Topaz	1955–2008	31,500	Panama	Formerly known as Empress of Britain, Queen Anna Maria, Carnivale, Fiesta Marina, and Olympic; Beached for scrap in Alang in 2008	
Mona Lisa	1965–2010	28,891	Bahamas	Formerly known as Kungsholm, Sea Princess, Victoria and Oceanic II; Out of Service in October 2010; Scrapped in Alang in 2016	
The Oceanic	1965–2012	39,241	Panama	Formerly known as Oceanic, Starship Oceanic and Big Red Boat I; Scrapped in Alang in 2012	
Ocean Dream	1975–1993	15,000	Panama	Formerly known as MS Tropicale, Costa Tropicale, and Pacific Star; Scrapped in Alang as Dream in 2020	
The Zenith	1992–2022	47,413	Panama	Formerly known as Zenith; Later renamed as TSM Singapore; Scrapped in Alang in 2022	

== Ship Description ==
Olvia is operated by Peace Boat, was built in 1976. She was built by Oy Wartsila AB, Turku Shipyard, Finland, initially as a cruise/car ferry. Later, she was operated under various names, including M.S. Leonid Brezhnev and M.S. Kareliya, before being named Olvia. Peace Boat chartered her from K&O Shipping of Ukraine for a period. formerly known as Kareliya & Leonid Brezhnev and she was beached for scrapped in 2022

The Topaz (31,500 GT) was a transatlantic ocean liner built in 1955 as Empress of Britain and operated as Peace Boat between 2000 and 2008.

Clipper Pacific (18,416 GT) was built in 1970 for Royal Caribbean and operated for Peace Boat briefly in 2008. However, due to numerous repeated problems with the ship, the charter was cut short, ending in Piraeus, Greece instead of ending in Japan as scheduled.

Mona Lisa (28,891 GRT) was built in 1966 by a shipyard in Scotland and chartered to replace the Clipper Pacific; she completed the remainder of the voyage and operated as Peace Boat between 2008 and 2009.

Oceanic (38,772 GT) was built in 1965 by an Italian shipyard and operated as Peace Boat between 2009 and 2012.

Ocean Dream (32,265 GT) was built in 1981 by a Danish shipyard and operated as Peace Boat between 2012 and 2020.

In July 2019 The Zenith (47,413 GT) was announced to leave Pullmantur's fleet in early 2020 to join Peace Boat. The ship was delivered to Peace Boat in February 2020 and renamed The Zenith.

Since 2020, Peace Boat is operating the Pacific World. which replaces the Ocean Dream and The Zenith.

== Other projects ==
=== Landmine Abolition Campaign ===
Since 1998, Peace Boat has continually run a project called P-MAC, or Peace Boat Mine Abolition Campaign, to support organizations carrying out landmine removal in such countries as Cambodia and Afghanistan. In the world there are approximately 110 million landmines in the ground, and even now many continue to be injured or lose their life without a trace. Most of these victims are not combatants but normal civilians. As of 2009, through a number of campaigns, Peace Boat raised money to clear 886,472 sq meters of landmine inundated areas and open five elementary schools. Fund raising campaigns are ongoing.

=== Peace Ball Project ===
Since 1999, Peace Boat has donated over 12,000 soccer balls to 43 countries. The Peace Ball project delivers soccer balls and other sports equipment to disadvantaged children, and uses the power of the world's most popular sport to build bridges of communication and solidarity.

=== GET Language Programme ===
Launched in 1999, the onboard GET language programme allows participants to communicate more effectively with the people they meet onboard and in port. The programme focuses on oral communication, viewing languages as global tools for international and intercultural exchange, and combines onboard classroom study with exchange programmes and home-stays in selected ports of call.

=== Global University Programme ===
In 2000, Peace Boat established its Global University peace education programme. Seminars at sea and study/exposure tours at ports of call make up the Global University curriculum, an intensive peace and sustainability education programme focused on experiential learning.

=== Global Partnership for the Prevention of Armed Conflict (GPPAC) ===
In 2004, Peace Boat became the Northeast Asia regional secretariat for the Global Partnership for the Prevention of Armed Conflict (GPPAC). This is an international network of NGOs working in peacebuilding and conflict prevention. It is made up of 15 regions, each working with its own action plan to address issues specific to each region.

=== Global Article 9 Campaign ===
In light of the Japanese government's pressure to amend it, Peace Boat together with the Japan Lawyers' International Solidarity Association (JALISA), launched the Global Article 9 Campaign to Abolish War in 2005. The Campaign strives not only to protect Article 9 locally, but also to build an international movement supporting Article 9 as the shared property of the world, calling for a global peace that does not rely on force.

=== Vietnam Defoliate Victim Support Campaign ===
From 2005 to 2008 Peace Boat raised approximately $13,000 in funds which were donated to Vietnam Association of Victims of Agent Orange and subsequently used to cover a portion of construction costs for a facility for supporting victims. On the 2009 cruise, Peace Boat visited the facility with a group of Japanese atomic bomb victims, and held the first exchange program there.

=== International Campaign to Abolish Nuclear Weapons (ICAN) ===
The International Campaign to Abolish Nuclear Weapons (ICAN) is a coalition of NGOs in 100 countries around the world. Peace Boat is a member of the campaign's international steering group, led by Executive Committee Member Kawasaki Akira. ICAN played a significant role in advocacy leading to the adoption of a treaty to prohibit nuclear weapons at the United Nations in New York in July 2017. In October 2017, the Norwegian Nobel Committee decided to award the Nobel Peace Prize for 2017 to ICAN. The organization received the award for its work to draw attention to the catastrophic humanitarian consequences of any use of nuclear weapons and for its ground-breaking efforts to achieve a treaty-based prohibition of such weapons.

=== The Hibakusha Project ===
The Hibakusha Project was started by Peace Boat to highlight the inhumanity of nuclear weapons and to forge a path toward a nuclear abolition. As part of the project, Hibakusha (atomic bomb survivors from Hiroshima and Nagasaki) join Peace Boat voyages to give their testimonies to the world of their first hand experiences with nuclear weapons, and call for their abolition. In 2016, the project has taken place on ninth separate Peace Boat voyages and more than 170 Hibakusha have travelled around the world sharing their testimonies.

=== Peace Boat Millennium Development Goals Campaign ===
Since 2009, Peace Boat run its own Millennium Development Goals Campaign in partnership with various international organizations and NGOs to raise awareness of the MDGs and the role of civil society in achieving these goals. Peace Boat's ship displayed the United Nations Millennium Campaign logo ‘End Poverty 2015’.

=== Peace Boat Disaster Relief Volunteer Centre ===
The Peace Boat Disaster Relief Volunteer Centre (PBV) was established following the tremendous devastation caused by the 2011 Great East Japan earthquake and tsunami. The centre based its activities in one of the worst affected areas, Ishinomaki City in Miyagi Prefecture, and dispatched thousands of volunteers there to support local residents in carrying out emergency relief efforts. PBV carries out domestic and international emergency relief work at sites affected by natural disasters such as typhoons, floods and heavy snow. At the same time, it works toward future disaster prevention and reduction by proactively building partnerships with business and local government authorities and cultivating a network of volunteer leaders ready to act.

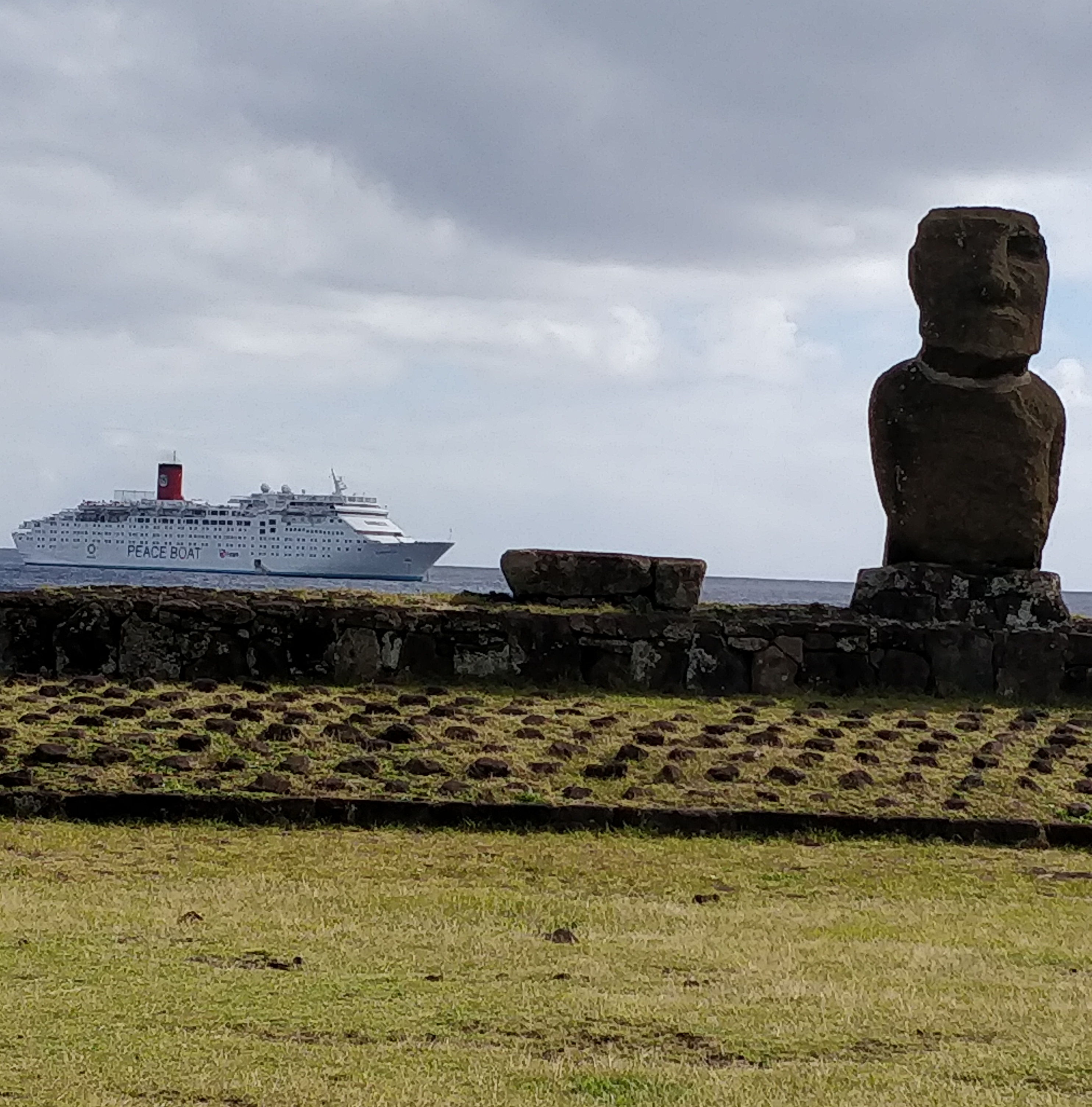
The Peace Boat, Ocean Dream, at Easter Island in June 2019

=== Ecoship ===
Peace Boat's Ecoship is a transformational programme to construct the planet's most environmentally sustainable cruise ship. Peace Boat organised a multi-disciplinary charrette, bringing together world experts from fields as diverse as naval architecture, renewable energy, and biophilic and biomimetic design with the goal of defining the specifications for a ‘restorative’ vessel – where radical energy efficiency and closed material flow combine for a net positive impact on the environment. It will be a flagship for climate action. Its whole-system design and maximization of renewable energy use will enable 40% CO_{2} cuts. Ecoship was introduced in an official press conference at COP21.

=== The Ocean and Climate Youth Ambassador Programme ===
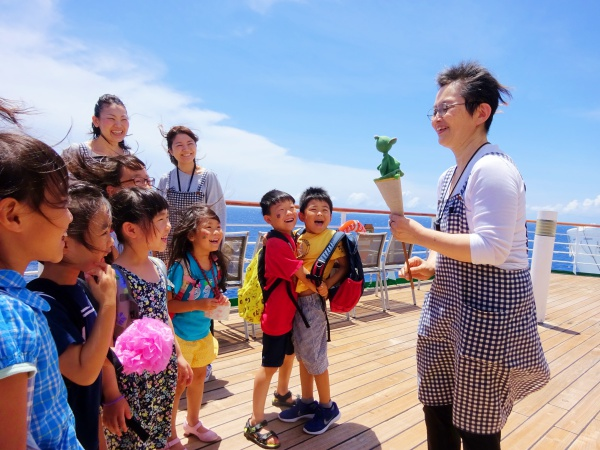
Montessori style kindergarten class

A group of young leaders from states on the front line of climate change and marine degradation joined Peace Boat's 95th Global Voyage in Barcelona on September and October 2017 as a part of a new programme to highlight these crucial issues and build momentum for climate action and the Bonn 2017 UN Climate Change Conference (COP23). These young people between 19 and 26 years of age were from the regions of the Pacific Ocean, Indian Ocean and Caribbean. The Ocean and Climate Youth Ambassador Programme was an endorsed event of the COP23 in line with Fiji's vision for the COP23, as recognized by the COP23 Presidency Secretariat. In June and July 2018, the second edition of the programme took place from Stockholm to New York City. The third edition took place on May and June 2019 from Valletta to New York City.
