= Shinzo Abe =

Prime Minister of Japan (2006–2007; 2012–2020)

Junior First Rank Shinzo Abe
- 安倍 晋三
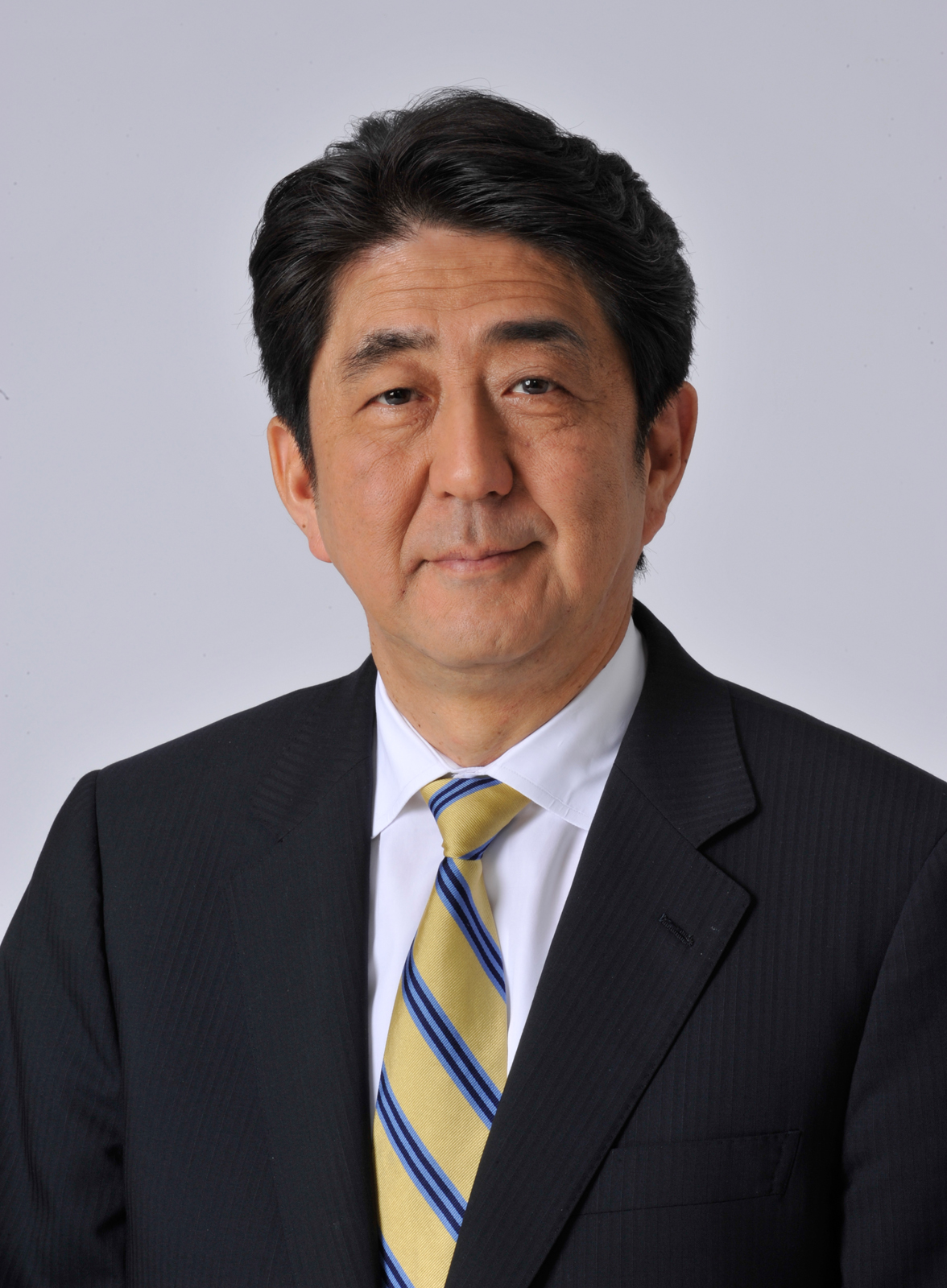
- Official portrait, 2012

Prime Minister of Japan
- In office 26 December 2012 – 16 September 2020
- Monarchs: Akihito; Naruhito
- Deputy: Tarō Asō
- Preceded by: Yoshihiko Noda
- Succeeded by: Yoshihide Suga
- In office 26 September 2006 – 26 September 2007
- Monarch: Akihito
- Preceded by: Junichiro Koizumi
- Succeeded by: Yasuo Fukuda

President of the Liberal Democratic Party
- In office 26 September 2012 – 14 September 2020
- Vice President: Masahiko Kōmura
- Secretary-General: Shigeru Ishiba; Sadakazu Tanigaki; Toshihiro Nikai
- Preceded by: Sadakazu Tanigaki
- Succeeded by: Yoshihide Suga
- In office 20 September 2006 – 23 September 2007
- Secretary-General: Hidenao Nakagawa; Tarō Asō
- Preceded by: Junichiro Koizumi
- Succeeded by: Yasuo Fukuda

Chief Cabinet Secretary
- In office 31 October 2005 – 26 September 2006
- Prime Minister: Junichiro Koizumi
- Preceded by: Hiroyuki Hosoda
- Succeeded by: Yasuhisa Shiozaki

Secretary-General of the Liberal Democratic Party
- In office 22 September 2003 – 24 September 2004
- President: Junichiro Koizumi
- Preceded by: Taku Yamasaki
- Succeeded by: Tsutomu Takebe

Deputy Chief Cabinet Secretary (Political affairs, House of Representatives)
- In office 4 July 2000 – 22 September 2003
- Prime Minister: Yoshirō Mori; Junichiro Koizumi
- Preceded by: Fukushiro Nukaga
- Succeeded by: Hiroyuki Hosoda

Member of the House of Representatives from Yamaguchi
- In office 18 July 1993 – 8 July 2022
- Preceded by: Shintaro Abe
- Succeeded by: Shinji Yoshida
- Constituency: 1st district (1993–1996); 4th district (1996–2022)

Personal details
- Born: 21 September 1954 Shinjuku, Tokyo, Japan
- Died: 8 July 2022 (aged 67) Kashihara, Nara, Japan
- Cause of death: Assassination by shooting
- Resting place: Abe Family Cemetery, Nagato, Yamaguchi, Japan
- Party: Liberal Democratic; Seiwakai
- Spouse: Akie Matsuzaki (m. 1987)
- Parents: Shintaro Abe (father); Yōko Abe (mother)
- Relatives: Satō–Kishi–Abe family
- Education: University of Southern California; Seikei University (BA)
- Awards: Full list

Japanese name
- Kanji: 安倍 晋三
- Kana: あべ しんぞう
Transcriptions
- Romanization: Abe Shinzō
- Shinzo Abe's voice Abe addressing the United States Congress; Recorded 29 April 2015
- a. The Nippon Kaigi is not a political party but a non-government organization and lobbying group.

Shinzo Abe (Note: /ˈʃɪnzoʊ ˈɑːbeɪ/ SHIN-zoh AH-bay; Japanese: 安倍 晋三, Hepburn: Abe Shinzō, IPA: [abe ɕindzoː]) (21 September 1954 – 8 July 2022) was Prime Minister of Japan and President of the Liberal Democratic Party (LDP) on two occasions: from 2006 to 2007 and from 2012 to 2020. At 8 years and 267 days, he is the longest serving prime minister in Japanese history.

Abe was born in Tokyo into the prominent Satō–Kishi–Abe family, the son of LDP politician Shintaro Abe and grandson of prime minister Nobusuke Kishi. He graduated from Seikei University and also attended the University of Southern California. After graduating from university, Abe worked in industry and party posts before being elected to the House of Representatives in 1993. Abe served as LDP Secretary-General from 2003 to 2004 and Chief Cabinet Secretary under Prime Minister Junichiro Koizumi from 2005 to 2006, when he replaced Koizumi as LDP President and Prime Minister. Abe became Japan's youngest post-war premier, and the first born after World War II. A staunch conservative and member of the ultranationalist organization Nippon Kaigi, which holds negationist views on Japanese history, Abe took right-wing stances including downplaying Japanese atrocities in textbooks, denying government coercion in the recruitment of comfort women during the war, and seeking revision of Article 9 of the Constitution. In 2007, he initiated the Quadrilateral Security Dialogue with the US, Australia, and India, aimed at resisting China's rise as a superpower. He resigned as premier that year due to his government's unpopularity and illness.

After recovering from his illness, Abe staged a political comeback in 2012, when he was again elected LDP President, leading the party to a landslide victory in that year's election. He became the first former Prime Minister to return to office since Shigeru Yoshida in 1948. In Abe's second term, he attempted to counter Japan's economic stagnation with "Abenomics", with mixed results. He was credited with reinstating the Trans-Pacific Partnership with a new agreement in 2018. In 2015, he passed the Legislation for Peace and Security which allowed deployment of the Japan Self-Defense Forces overseas under certain strict conditions, which was controversial and met with protests by Students Emergency Action for Liberal Democracy. Abe led the LDP to further victories in the 2014 and 2017 elections, becoming Japan's longest-serving Prime Minister. In 2020, he again resigned, citing a relapse of his illness, and was succeeded by Yoshihide Suga.

In 2022, Abe was assassinated in Nara while delivering a campaign speech for the upper house elections. The killer, Tetsuya Yamagami, confessed he was motivated by Abe's ties with the Unification Church. This was the first assassination of a former Japanese Prime Minister since 1936. A polarizing figure in Japan, Abe was praised by his supporters for strengthening Japan's security and international stature, while opponents criticized him for nationalistic policies and historical negationism, which they viewed as threatening Japanese pacifism and damaging relations with China and South Korea.

== Early life ==
=== Family ===
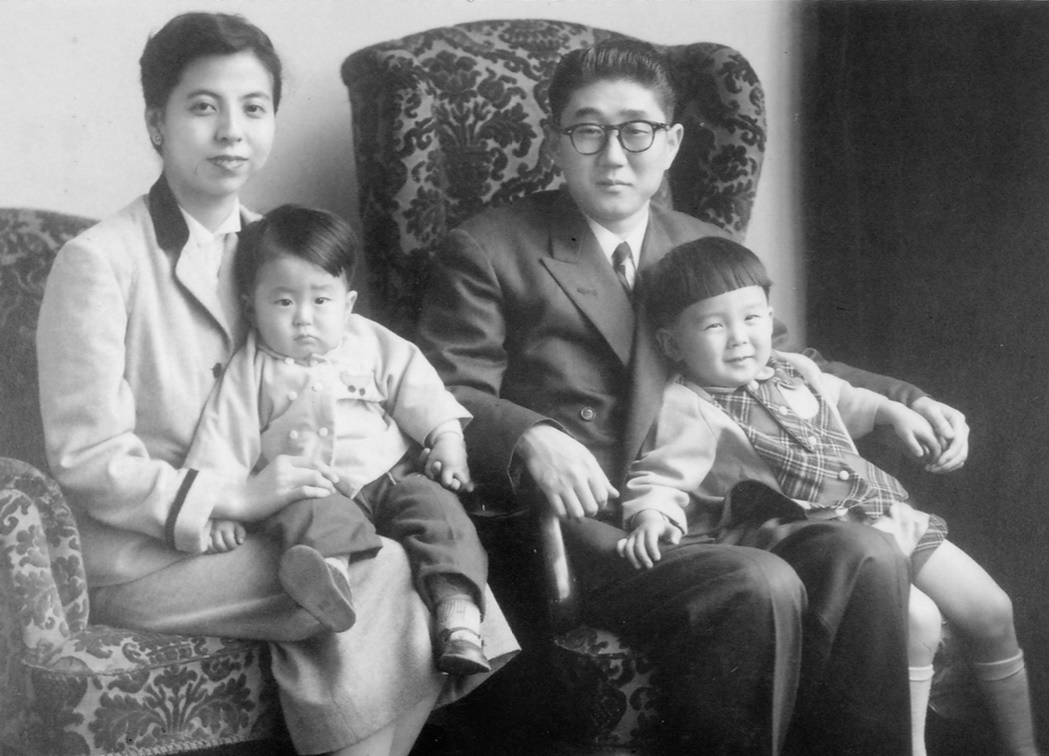
The Abe family in 1956 (left to right): his mother Yōko, Shinzo at the age of two, his father Shintaro and his elder brother Hironobu

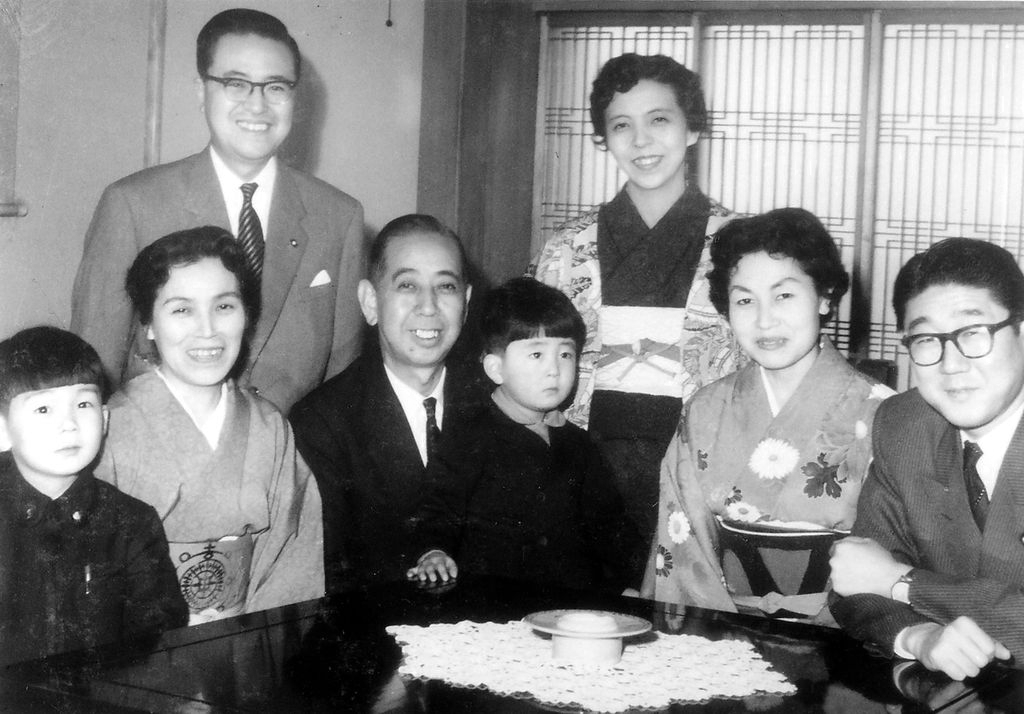
Shinzo (center) with his family and grandfather Nobusuke Kishi (4th left), who influenced Abe's beliefs

Shinzo Abe was born on 21 September 1954 to a prominent political family in Shinjuku, Tokyo. His father Shintaro Abe served in the House of Representatives from 1958 to 1991, with stints as Chief Cabinet Secretary, Minister for International Trade and Industry, and Minister for Foreign Affairs, and was considered a strong candidate for prime minister before his death. His mother Yōko was a noted calligrapher.

Abe's maternal grandfather, Nobusuke Kishi, was a minister in the wartime cabinet of Prime Minister Hideki Tojo. At the end of the war, Kishi was imprisoned as a suspected "Class-A" war criminal by the US military occupation of Japan, but was released and later de-purged as part of the Occupation's "reverse course" due to the Cold War. Kishi helped found the Liberal Democratic Party (LDP) in 1955 and served as Prime Minister of Japan from 1957 until his 1960 resignation following the Anpo protests. Abe viewed Kishi as his "No 1 role model" and was influenced by many of his beliefs, like Kishi's hawkish stance on China. Regarding Kishi, Abe later wrote: "Some people used to point to my grandfather as a 'Class-A war criminal suspect,' and I felt strong repulsion. Because of that experience, I may have become emotionally attached to 'conservatism,' on the contrary".

Abe's paternal grandfather, Kan Abe, was a Yamaguchi landowner who served in the House of Representatives during World War II. Kan Abe was a pacifist who opposed the Tojo government and war in East Asia.

=== Education and early career ===
Abe attended Seikei Elementary School and Seikei Junior and Senior High School (成蹊中学校・高等学校). Although as a boy he aspired to become a filmmaker, Abe's family history led him upon a political path. At the age of 17, he was diagnosed with ulcerative colitis. He studied public administration and graduated with a bachelor's degree in political science from Seikei University in 1977. From 1978 to 1979, Abe attended the University of Southern California where he studied English as a visiting student. After taking courses in history, international relations, and political science for three semesters, Abe left. Abe is reported to have been an average student.

In April 1979, Abe began working for Kobe Steel. He left the company in 1982 to serve as secretary to his father, who had been appointed foreign minister in the Nakasone cabinet. Shintaro Abe visited 81 countries in the 1980s. These travels imparted to Abe the importance of building relations with foreign leaders. He continued as secretary when his father served as chairman of the LDP General Council and LDP secretary-general.

== Early political career ==
=== Member of the House of Representatives ===
After his father's death in 1991, Abe was elected to the first district of Yamaguchi Prefecture in 1993, winning the most votes of the four Representatives elected in the SNTV multi-member district. Abe joined the Seiwa Seisaku Kenkyūkai, a faction in the Liberal Democratic Party. Shintaro Abe had headed the faction from 1986 until his death. Yoshirō Mori and Junichiro Koizumi were seniors in the faction. When Abe first became a member of parliament, the opposition parties had agreed to form a "non-LDP, non-communist" government with Morihiro Hosokawa as Prime Minister. The LDP later returned to government by forming a coalition with the Japan Socialist Party, with JSP leader Tomiichi Murayama as Prime Minister. Abe and other conservatives supported the coalition, but criticized the compromises given, with Abe later wriing that "By making the leader of a party with public approval of only five or six percent prime minister, naturally the dissatisfaction within the party was amplified. The opposition was especially large from people who had become representatives who approved of the LDP’s ideas, who, if I had to say, belonged to the conservative mainstream."

Abe became one of the few newly elected LDP representatives to be named to the Foreign Affairs Committee. During this time, he extensively read on the constitution and national security, while also reading the writing of conservative author Susumu Nishibe and Spanish theorist José Ortega y Gasset’s The Revolt of the Masses. During the 1990s, Abe joined various right-wing conservative parliamentary groups such as the Diet members’ league of the Shinto Association of Spiritual Leadership, the 50th Anniversary of the End of the War established in 1994, and the Junior Parliamentarian Group to Consider Education and the Way Forward for Japan and the Nippon Kaigi Parliamentarian Association established in 1997. He was particularly active in the Junior Parliamentarian Group, where he served as the director of its Secretariat. Many of his future political allies came from these groups, including his close political friend Shōichi Nakagawa, with whom he focused on battling the "masochistic" narrative on the comfort women.

Abe also took on the issue of Japanese abductees taken to North Korea; in 1997, he raised the issue in the Diet, where he criticized the government's response as "equivalent to abdicating the duties of the state". He became involved in the creation of the Association of the Families of Victims Kidnapped by North Korea and became the leader of the Parliamentarians’ League to Rescue Japanese Citizens Suspected of Being Abducted by North Korea. He attacked the LDP, the bureaucracy and the media for its handling of the issue, accusing North Korea of "state terrorism". In 1998, he became the deputy chairman of the LDP's Parliamentary Affairs Committee. Abe suffered a severe ulcerative colitis attack in 1998 but found a treatment to that allowed remission. April 1999 he formed a study group with Yasuhisa Shiozaki, Nobuteru Ishihara, and Takumi Nemoto that was dubbed as the "NAIS Club". In 1999, Abe became Director of the LDP Social Affairs Division. In 2000, Abe's home and the office of his supporters in Shimonoseki, in Yamaguchi Prefecture, were attacked with Molotov cocktails on numerous occasions. The perpetrators were several yakuza belonging to the Kudo-kai, a Kitakyushu-based designated bōryokudan syndicate. The reason for the attacks was believed to be that Abe's local aide refused to give cash to a Shimonoseki real estate broker in return for supporting a Shimonoseki mayoral candidate in 1999.

=== Deputy Chief Cabinet Secretary ===
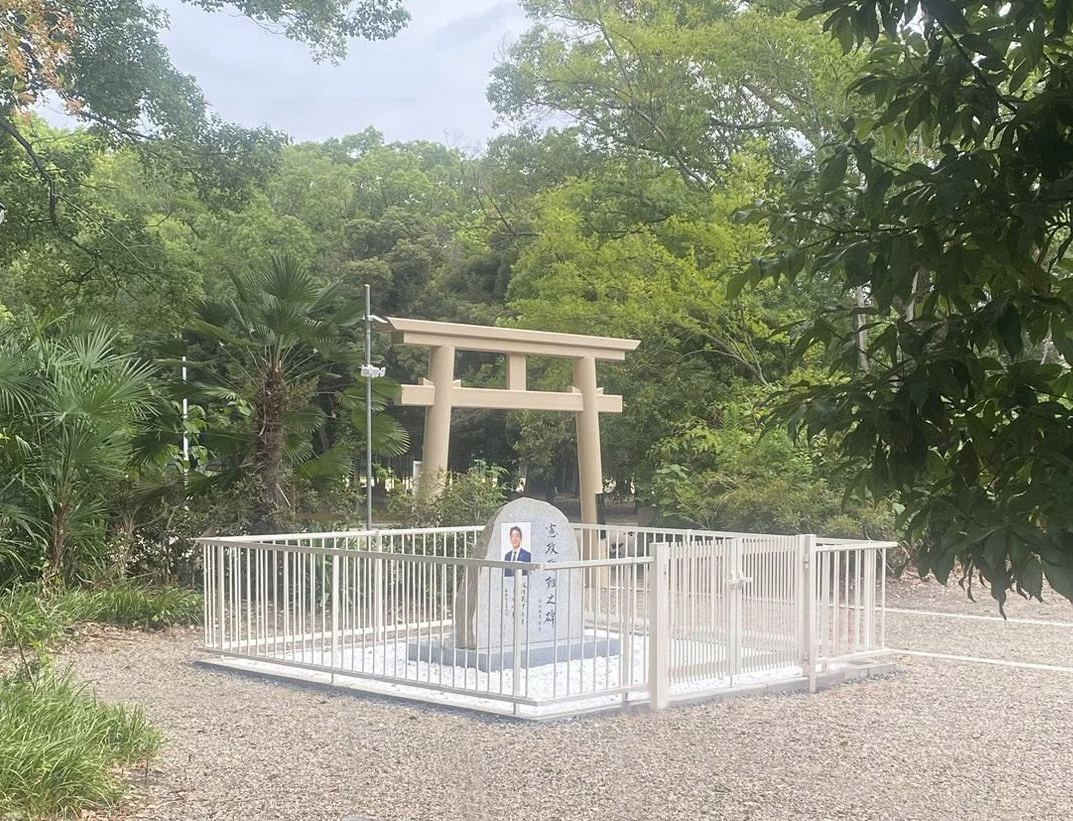
Memorial monument for Shinzō Abe at Osaka Gokoku Shrine in Osaka Japan

Abe was Deputy Chief Cabinet Secretary in the Yoshirō Mori and Junichiro Koizumi Cabinets from 2000 to 2003. During this time, he had a close relationship with Koizumi, though his relationship with Chief Cabinet Secretary Yasuo Fukuda was chillier. In one instance in 2002, 2001, Abe secured a visa for former Taiwanese president Lee Teng-hui despite Fukuda's objections. In May 2002, Abe made an off-the-record statement during a speech at Waseda University stating that Japan was not prohibited from possessing nuclear weapons, which reportedly enraged Fukuda.

Abe was the chief negotiator for the Japanese government on behalf of the families of Japanese abductees taken to North Korea. As a part of the effort, he accompanied Koizumi to meet North Korean leader Kim Jong Il in 2002. After North Korea revealed a list of abducted Japanese citizens, with some being dead, Abe advised Koizumi to be prepared to leave without signing a joint consensus if Kim Jong Il was not prepared to apologize. He gained national popularity when he demanded that Japanese abductees visiting Japan remain in the country, in defiance of North Korea. Kim later spoke to the Japanese delegation, acknowledging the "appalling incident", with the two countries subsequently signing the Pyongyang Declaration. North Korea's admittance of the abductions caused Abe's popularity to rise due to his previously hawkish stance on North Korea. Abe also successfully pushed Koizumi's administration for a tougher stance on North Korea. After North Korea allowed the five victims that it said were alive to return to Japan, on the condition that they return later to North Korea, Abe argued that they should not be returned, while Fukuda urged the government to honor the deal. Eventually, Abe secured a victory and the abductees were not returned; the eight family members of the abductees were eventually released in May 2004.

=== Secretary-General of the LDP and Chief Cabinet Secretary ===
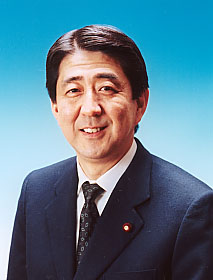
Abe (pictured in 2002) was first elected to the House of Representatives in 1993.

In September 2003, Koizumi mulled appointing Abe as an LDP Deputy Secretary-General; instead he was appointed LDP Secretary-General. Abe was the leader of a project team within the LDP that conducted a survey on "excessive sexual education and gender-free education". Among the items to which this team raised objections were anatomical dolls and other curricular materials "not taking into consideration the age of children", school policies banning traditional boys' and girls' festivals, and mixed-gender physical education. The team sought to provide a contrast to the Democratic Party of Japan (DPJ), which it alleged supported such policies. After the 2003 general election, in which the DPJ gained seats, Abe was demoted to acting secretary-general. Abe supported sending the Japan Self-Defense Forces (JSDF) on a dispatch to Iraq to help rebuild the country after the United States invasion. In a parliamentary vote to approve the dispatch of the SDF, Abe tried convince to three skeptical senior LDP representatives, Kooichi Katoo, Makoto Koga and Shizuka Kamei, to vote in favor, later issuing reprimands against them due to them abstaining.

Abe was quiet on the privatization of Japan Post, instead focusing on cultural issues. On 13 October 2005, Koizumi appointed Abe as Chief Cabinet Secretary, helping Abe to be more visible. Regarding the economy, Abe favored fiscal expansion instead of raising taxes. On 12 August 2006, he declared his candidacy for the LDP presidential election. His chief competitors for the position were Sadakazu Tanigaki and Tarō Asō. Yasuo Fukuda was a leading early contender but ultimately chose not to run. Former prime minister Yoshirō Mori, to whose faction both Abe and Fukuda belonged, stated that the faction strongly leant toward Abe. On 20 September 2006, Abe was elected to succeed Koizumi as the president of the ruling Liberal Democratic Party.

== First premiership (2006–2007) ==
=== First Cabinet ===
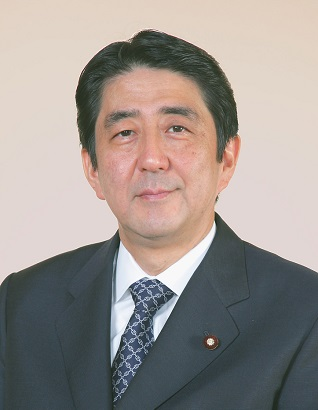
Abe (pictured in 2006) was the youngest prime minister since Fumimaro Konoe in 1941.

On 26 September 2006, Abe was inaugurated as Japanese prime minister. Elected at age 52, he was the youngest prime minister since Fumimaro Konoe in 1941. He was also the first prime minister born after World War II. Abe's first cabinet was announced on 26 September 2006. The only minister retained in his position from the previous Koizumi cabinet was Foreign Minister Tarō Asō, who had been one of Abe's competitors for the LDP presidency. In addition to the cabinet positions existing under Koizumi, Abe created five new "advisor" positions. He reshuffled his cabinet on 27 August 2007. Commentators noted that these changes seemed to be an effort by Abe to organize the prime minister's office into something more akin to the White House. The New York Times observed that his cabinet appeared to place a larger emphasis on foreign policy and national security instead of domestic concerns like economic policy. It also speculated that Abe's primary goal may have been to revise the pacifist constitution.

=== Domestic policy ===
Abe expressed a general commitment to the reforms instituted by his predecessor, Junichiro Koizumi. He took some steps toward balancing the Japanese budget, such as appointing a tax policy expert, Kōji Omi, as minister of finance. Omi previously supported increases in the national consumption tax, although Abe distanced himself from this policy and sought to achieve much of his budget-balancing through spending cuts. He started using the term "re-challenge" (再チャレンジ), emphasizing the need to give all Japanese second chances to succeed. Accordingly, Abe convened an advisory council to draft reforms to promote new opportunities for the disadvantaged. Lawmakers close to Abe, led by Yoshihide Suga, launched the Parliamentary League in Support of Re-Challenge. On 23 October 2006, Abe stated he was looking for some LDP members who were expelled for opposing Koizumi's privatization of Japan Post back to the party, which caused a decline in his popularity. Eventually, Abe sought a compromise by requiring those who were expelled that want to return to sign loyalty pledges.

In March 2007, Abe stated that there was no evidence that the Japanese military had forced women into sexual slavery during World War II, which the Japanese government had admitted and apologized for in the 1992 Kono Statement. Responding to a potential motion by the US Congress encouraging Japan to acknowledge the atrocity, Abe stated that the Japanese government would not apologize again. Abe held conservative views in the Japanese imperial succession debate. Shortly after the birth of Prince Hisahito of Akishino, he abandoned a proposed legislative amendment to permit women to inherit the Chrysanthemum Throne.

=== Foreign policy ===
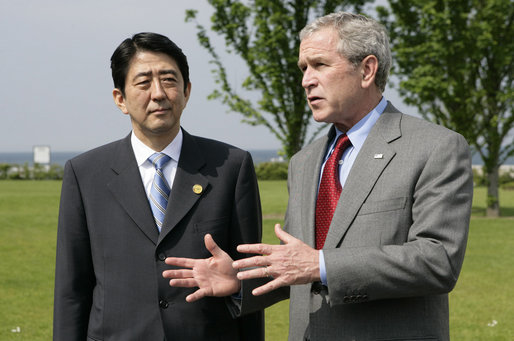
Abe with United States president George W. Bush at the G8 summit in Heiligendamm, Germany, 2007

Abe generally took a hard-line stance on North Korea, especially regarding the North Korean abductions of Japanese citizens. Abe publicly recognized the need for improved relations with China and, along with Foreign Minister Tarō Asō, sought an eventual summit meeting with General Secretary of the Chinese Communist Party and Chinese president Hu Jintao. Abe also said that China–Japan relations should not continue to be based on "emotions". Abe, in his four terms as the prime minister of Japan, sought to upgrade the strategic Japan–India relationship. Abe initiated the Quadrilateral Security Dialogue between Japan, the United States, Australia, and India in 2007, which was seen as a counter to China's rising power.

=== Defense ===
Abe sought to revise or broaden the interpretation of Article 9 of the Japanese Constitution in order to permit Japan to maintain de jure military forces. He stated that "we are reaching the limit in narrowing down differences between Japan's security and the interpretation of our constitution". During his first period as prime minister, he upgraded the Japan Defense Agency to full ministry status. Like his predecessors, he supported the Japanese alliance with the United States. Abe supported the US-led Iraq War.

=== Resignation ===
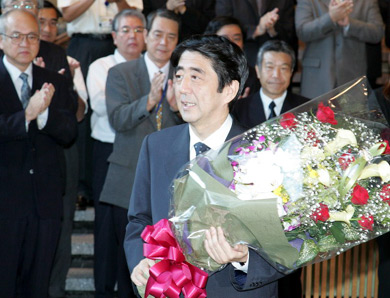
Abe resigned as prime minister in September 2007 (pictured).

In the lead-up to the July election, Abe's Agriculture Minister Toshikatsu Matsuoka committed suicide following a series of political funding scandals. He was the first cabinet member to commit suicide since World War II. Abe's ruling Liberal Democratic Party suffered great losses in the upper house election, losing control for the first time in 52 years. Agricultural minister, Norihiko Akagi, involved in a political funding scandal, resigned after the election. Additionally, Abe's rejection of a possible female Japanese monarch, which led to the Japanese succession controversy, diminished his support base. In an attempt to revive his administration, Abe announced a new cabinet in August 2007. Support for Abe rose by 10 percent as a result; however, the new agricultural minister Takehiko Endo, involved in a finance scandal, resigned only seven days later.

On 12 September 2007, only three days after a new parliamentary session had begun, Abe announced his intention to resign his position as prime minister at an unscheduled press conference. The announcement came just minutes before opposition leaders were scheduled to question him in Parliament and shocked many. Abe had described himself as a "politician who fights" and previously pledged not to resign. Abe explained that his unpopularity was hindering the passage of an anti-terrorism law, involving among other things Japan's continued military presence in Afghanistan. Party officials also said the embattled prime minister was suffering from poor health.

== Out of office (2007–2012) ==
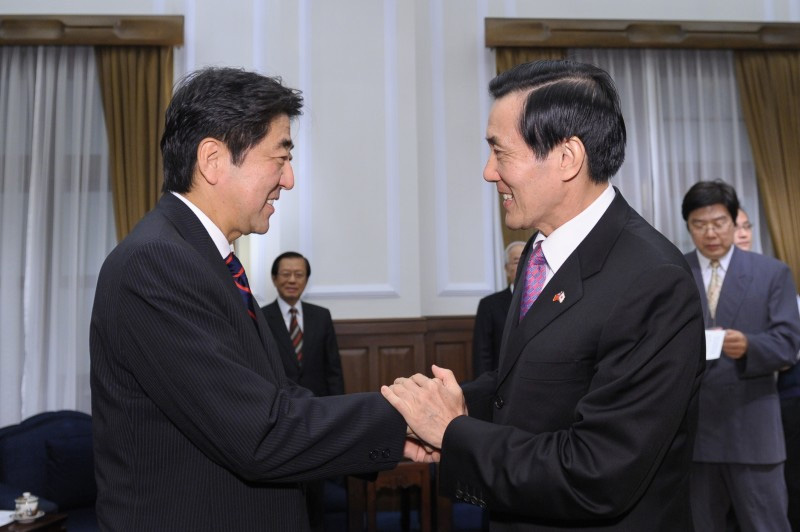
Abe meeting with President Ma Ying-jeou during his 2010 visit to Taiwan

Abe remained in the National Diet following his resignation as prime minister. He was re-elected to his Yamaguchi 4th district seat in the 2009 election, when the Liberal Democratic Party lost power to the DPJ. On 15 October 2010, Abe delivered a speech in Washington DC to the Hudson Institute on US-Japan relations. Japan had recently been surpassed by China as the number two economy in the world, a position that it had held for the previous 40 years. Abe said: "It appears that China hopes to gain control not only over Taiwan, but also over the South China Sea, the East China Sea and, indeed, the entire Western Pacific... China's military strategy has rested on the concept of a 'strategic frontier'. In a nutshell, this very dangerous idea posits that borders and exclusive economic zones are determined by national power, and that as long as China's economy continues to grow, its sphere of influence will continue to expand. Some might associate this with the German concept of 'lebensraum'." Abe saw in the ASEAN countries a counterbalance to Chinese expansionism. Abe feared the Finlandization of Japan with respect to China, and saw the reaction of the Kan Cabinet to the September 2010 Senkaku boat collision incident as "a very foolish move" and "frighteningly naive". He stated the "imperative that Japan conduct a review of its Three Principles on Arms Exports."

While serving as a member of the Japanese Diet, Abe visited Taiwan in 2010 and 2011. There he met with president Ma Ying-jeou, former president Lee Teng-hui and future president Tsai Ing-wen, who was then the leader of the Democratic Progressive Party. Ma described Abe as "the ROC's best friend" and said Abe was the third generation of his family to have close ties with the Republic of China. Abe also visited the National Revolutionary Martyrs' Shrine, a shrine dedicated to the war dead of the Republic of China, including those who died in the Second Sino-Japanese War. Abe later revealed that the illness that contributed to ending his first term as prime minister was ulcerative colitis, but that he recovered due to access to a drug, Asacol, that was previously unavailable in Japan.

=== Second LDP presidency and 2012 general election ===
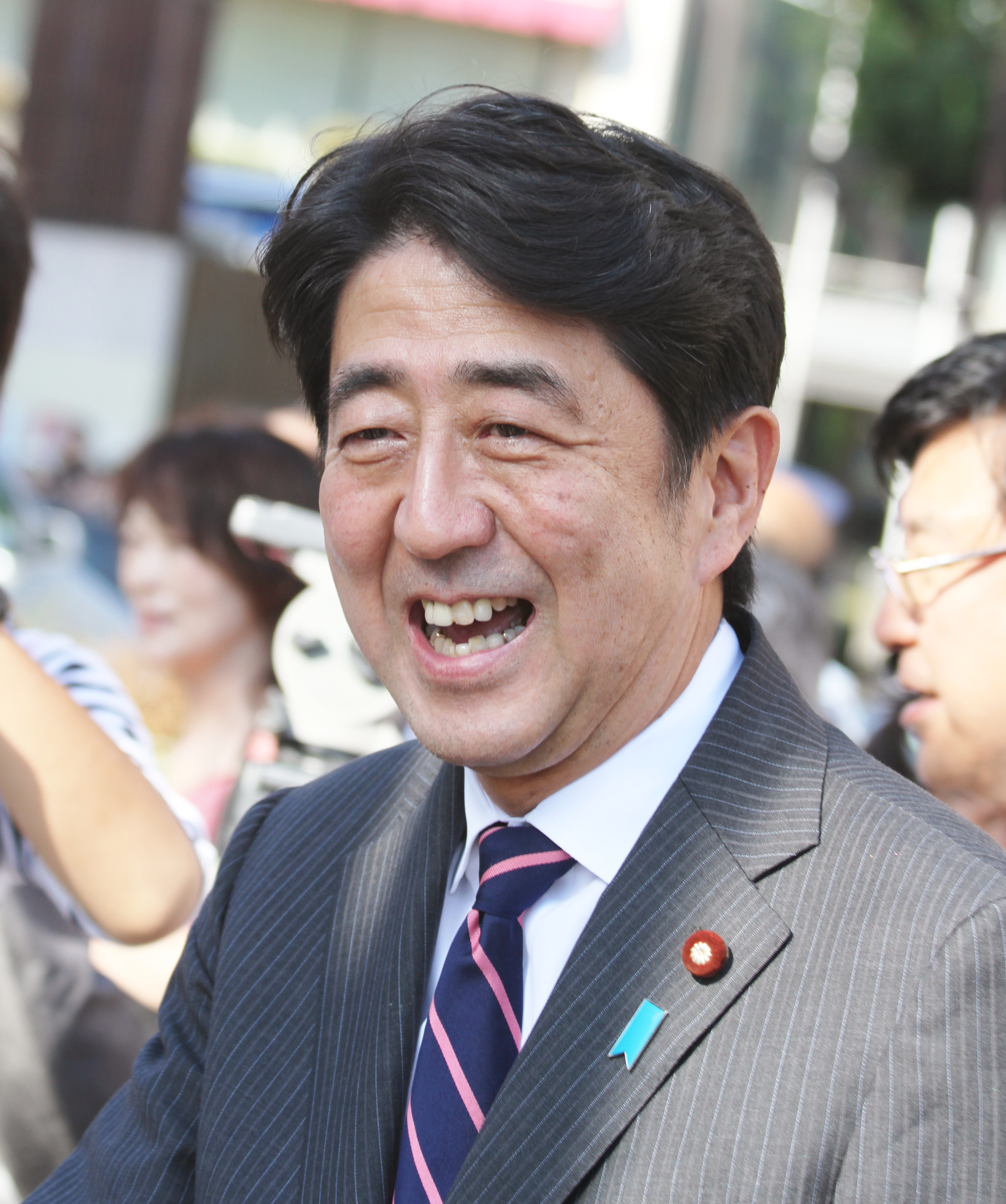
Abe (pictured campaigning in 2012) briefly served as opposition leader.

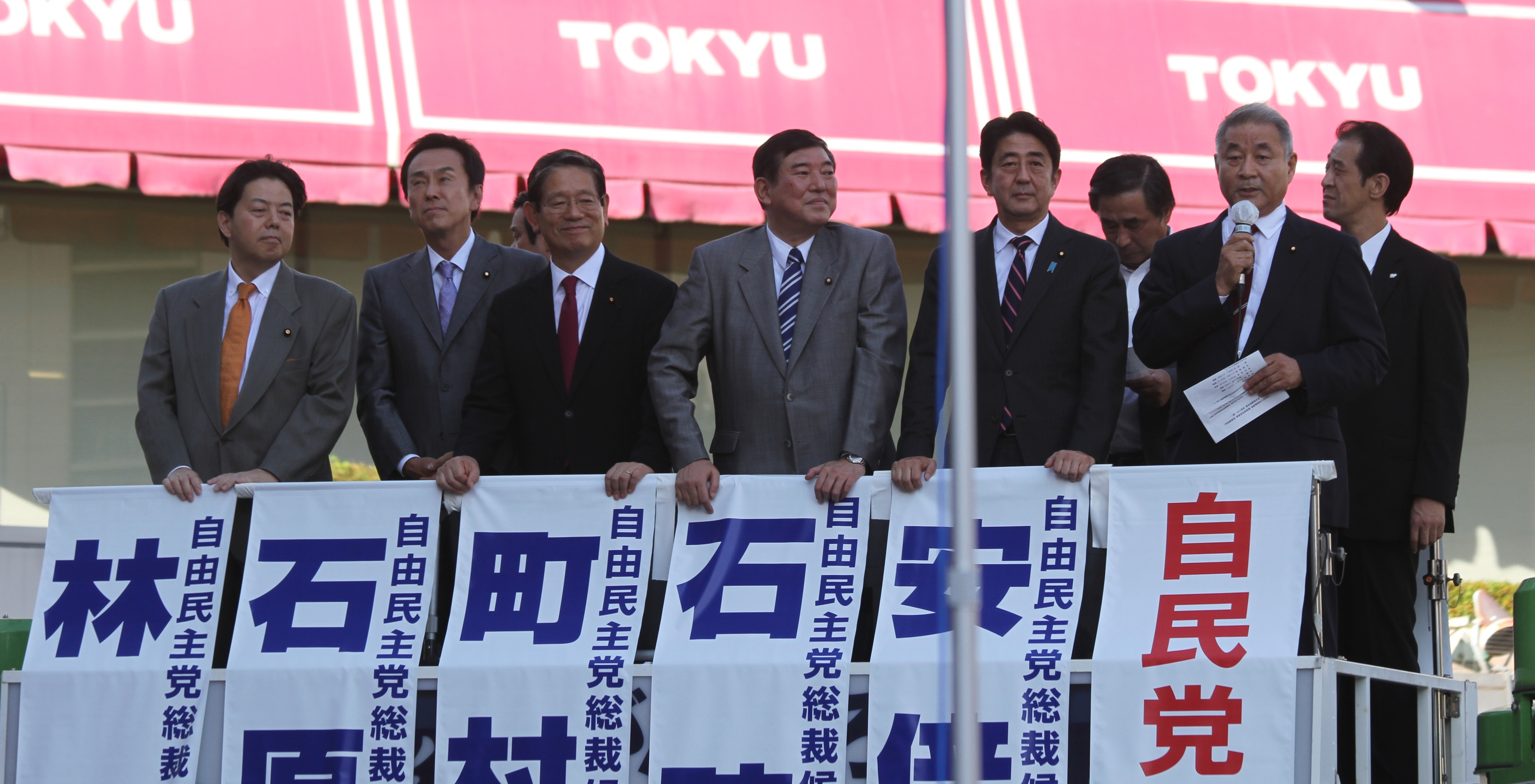
Abe and other candidates campaigning during the LDP presidential election in 2012. His chief rival, Shigeru Ishiba, is standing immediately to his right.

Following the resignation of LDP president Sadakazu Tanigaki, Abe was re-elected as president of the party on 26 September 2012, coming in second out of five candidates in the first round of voting, but defeating former Defense Minister Shigeru Ishiba in a runoff vote by 108 votes to 89.

Abe returned to the LDP leadership at a time of political turmoil, as the governing DPJ had lost its majority in the lower house due to party splits over nuclear policies and the cabinet's move to raise the consumption tax from 5 to 10 percent. Prime Minister Yoshihiko Noda was forced to rely on the LDP to pass the consumption tax bill and in return was pressured by Abe and the opposition parties to hold a snap general election. Noda agreed to this on the conditions that the LDP passed a bond-financing bill and would support a commission to reform the social security system and address electoral malapportionment in the next diet session.

On 16 November 2012, Prime Minister Noda announced the dissolution of the lower house and that the general election would be held on 16 December. Abe campaigned using the slogan "Nippon o Torimodosu" ("Take back Japan"), promising economic revival through monetary easing, higher public spending and the continued use of nuclear energy, and a tough line in territorial disputes. In the elections on 16 December 2012, the LDP won 294 seats in the 480-seat House of Representatives. Together with the New Komeito Party (which partnered with the LDP since the late 1990s), Abe was able to form a coalition government that controlled a two-thirds majority in the lower house, allowing it to override the upper house's veto.

== Second premiership (2012–2020) ==
=== Second Cabinet (2012–2014) ===
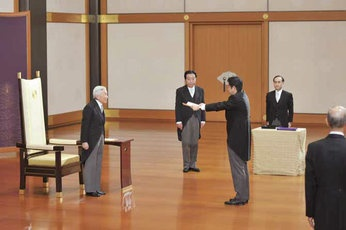
Emperor Akihito formally appoints Abe to office as prime minister, 2012

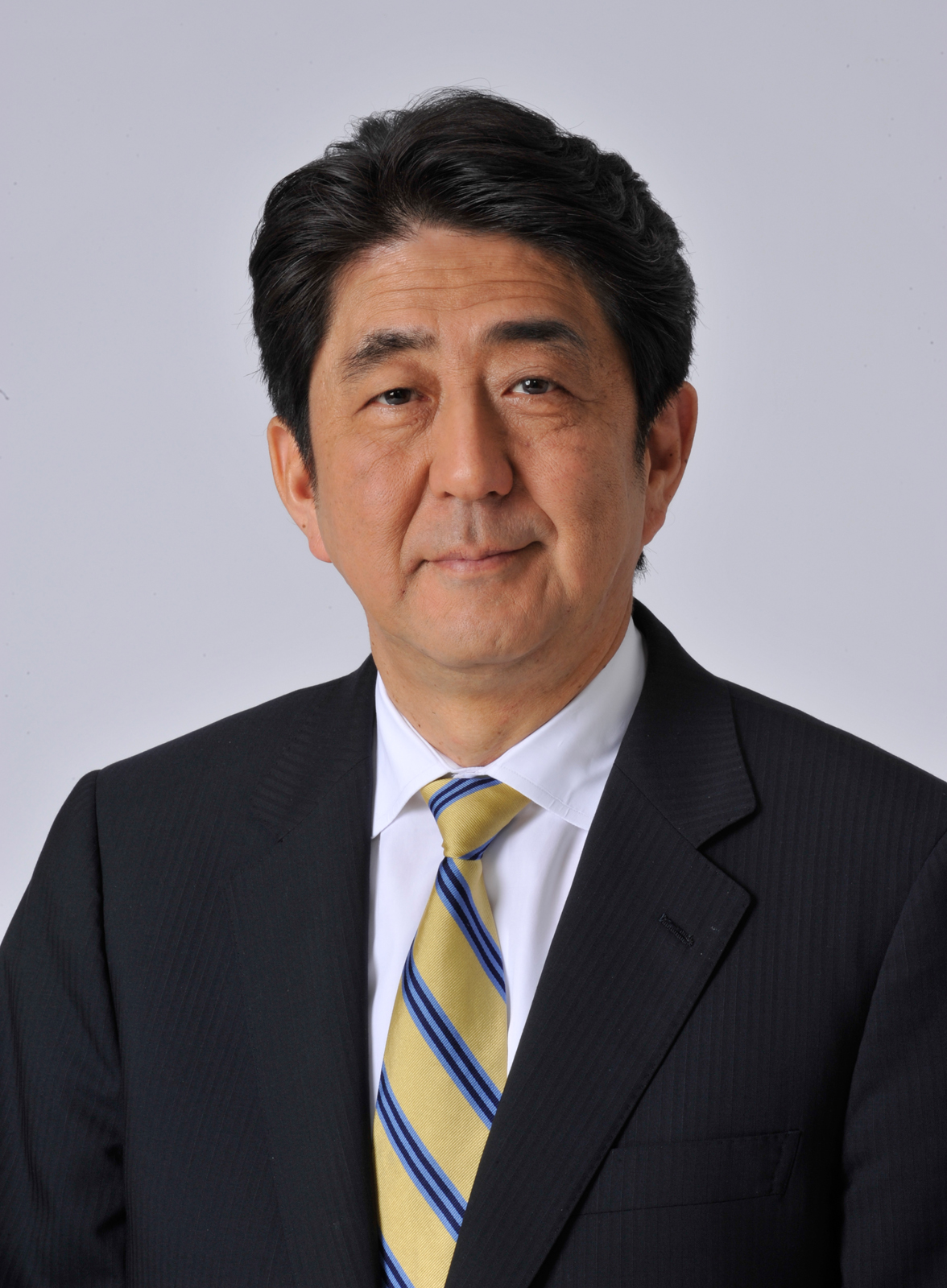
Official portrait, 2012

On 26 December 2012, Abe was formally elected as prime minister by the Diet, with the support of 328 out of 480 members of the House of Representatives. He and his second cabinet were sworn in later that day. The new government included LDP heavyweights such as former prime minister Tarō Asō as deputy prime minister and finance minister, Yoshihide Suga as chief cabinet secretary and Akira Amari as economy minister.

==== Economic policy ====
The Second Abe cabinet revived the Council on Economic and Fiscal Policy (CEFP) that had played a key role in formulating economic policy during the Koizumi cabinet, but had been abandoned by the 2009–2012 DPJ administrations.

Abe declared in his 2013 policy speech to the Diet that economic revival and escaping deflation was "the greatest and urgent issue" facing Japan. His economic strategy, referred to as Abenomics, consisted of the so-called "three arrows" (an allusion to an old Japanese story) of policy. The first arrow was monetary expansion aimed at achieving a 2% inflation target, the second a flexible fiscal policy to act as an economic stimulus in the short term, then achieve a budget surplus, and the third a growth strategy focusing on structural reform and private sector investment to achieve long-term growth.

==== "First Arrow": Monetary policy ====
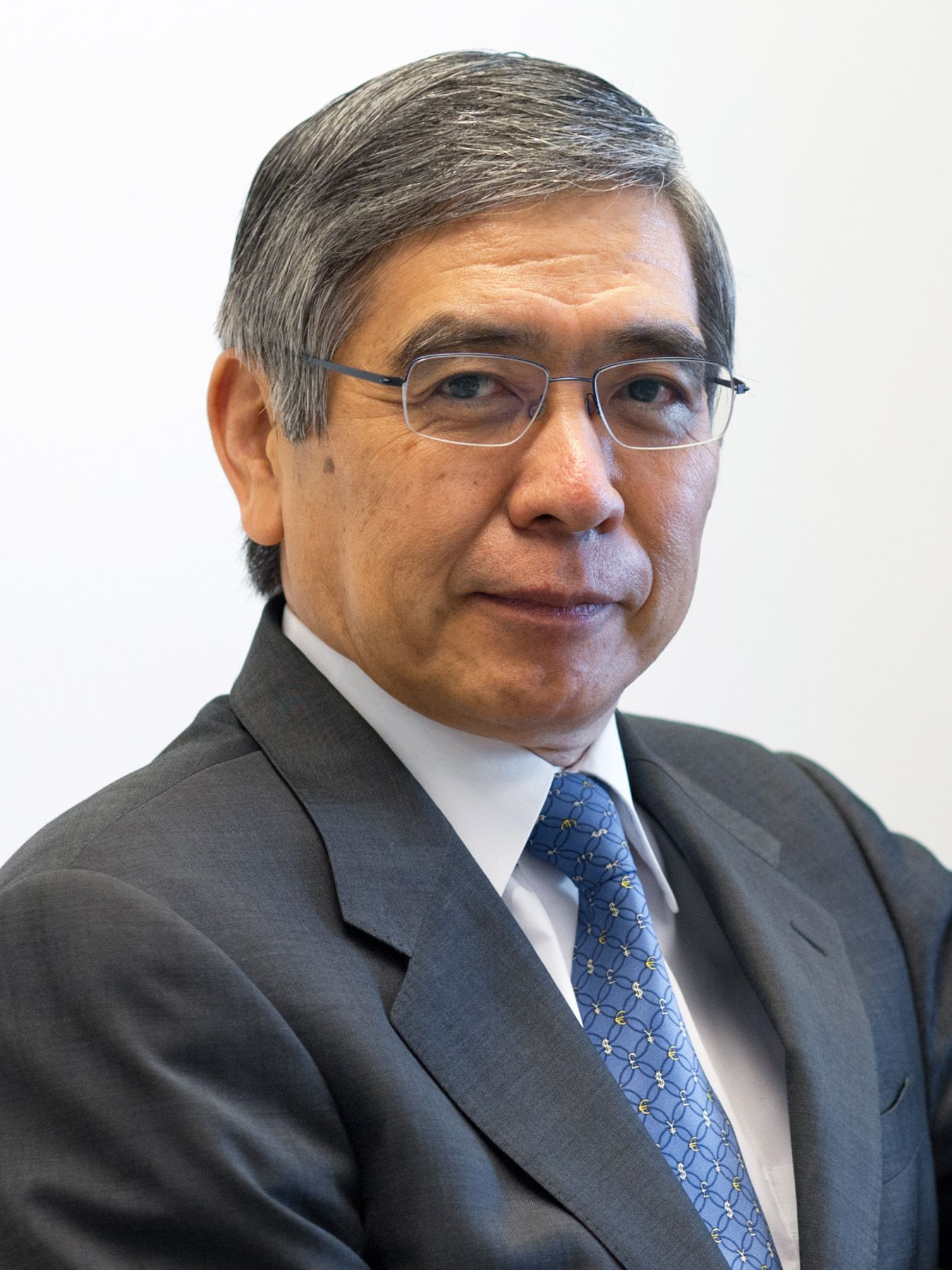
Haruhiko Kuroda, whom Abe appointed as Governor of the Bank of Japan (BOJ) in spring 2013, implemented the "first arrow" monetary policy.

At the first CEFP meeting in January 2013, Abe declared that the Bank of Japan should follow a policy of monetary easing to achieve a target of 2 percent inflation. Abe maintained pressure on the bank's governor, Masaaki Shirakawa, who was reluctant to set specific targets, into agreeing to the policy. In February, after Abe publicly speculated that the government could legislate to strip the bank of independence, Shirakawa announced he was leaving office prematurely before his term expired. Abe then appointed Haruhiko Kuroda as governor, who had previously advocated inflation targets, and who has pursued the government's policies of monetary easing.

After the first meeting of the bank's monetary policy committee after he had taken office in April, Kuroda announced an aggressive program of easing intended to double the money supply and achieve the 2 percent inflation target at "the earliest possible time". Over the first six months of the second Abe Cabinet, the Yen fell from a high of ¥77 to the dollar to ¥101.8, and the Nikkei 225 rose by 70 percent.

==== "Second Arrow": Fiscal policy ====
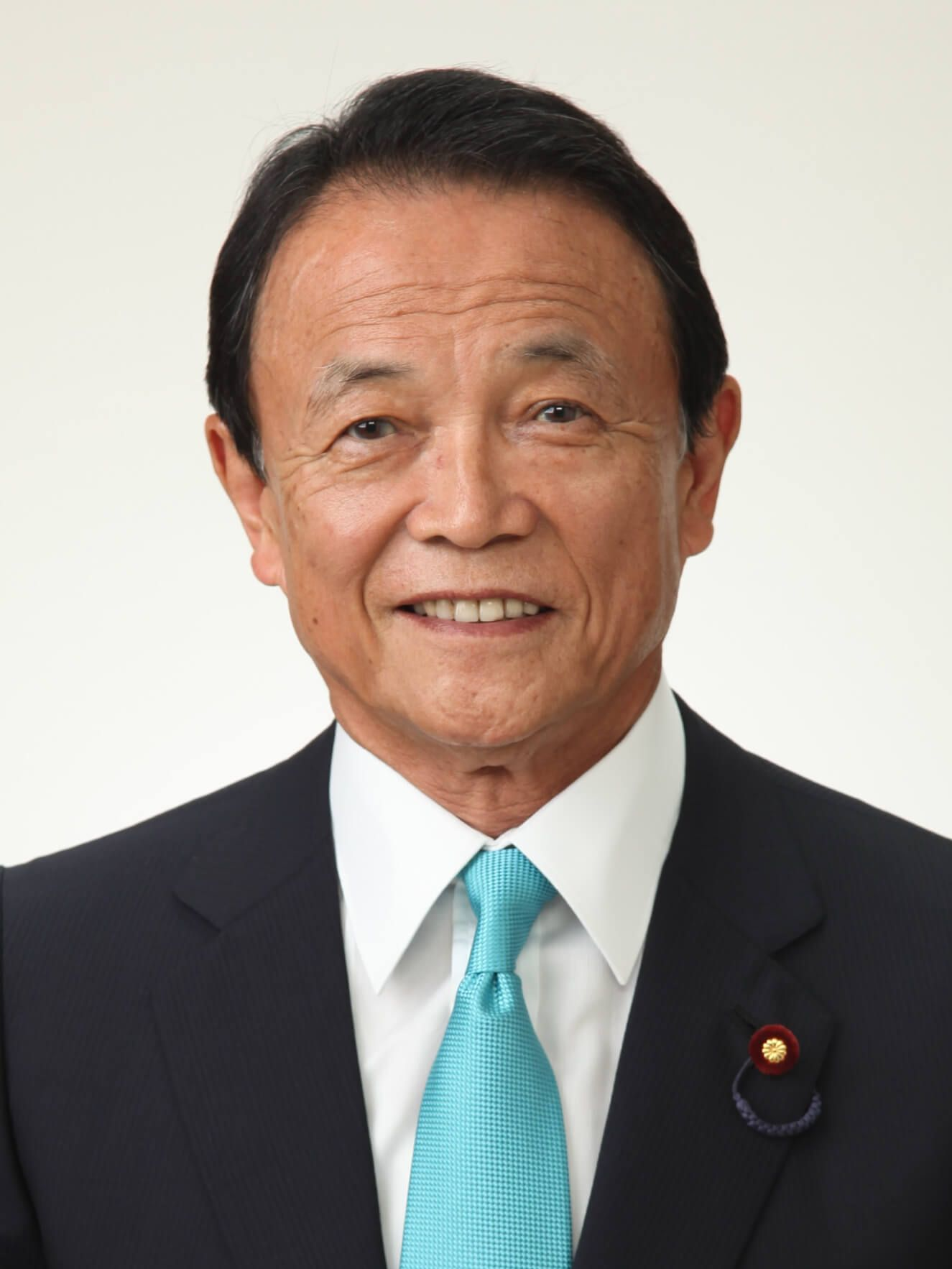
Abe's Minister of Finance Tarō Asō, who also served as deputy prime minister

The Abe Cabinet's first budget included a 10.3 trillion yen stimulus package, composed of public works spending, aid for small businesses and investment incentives, that aimed to increase growth by 2 percent. The budget also increased defense spending and manpower while reducing foreign aid.

In 2013, Abe decided to proceed with the first stage of the increase in the consumption tax from 5 to 8 percent in April 2014 (with a second stage envisaged raising it to 10 percent in October 2015). The bill to raise the tax had been passed under the previous DPJ government, but the final decision lay with the prime minister. While this was expected to affect economic growth in the quarter following the rise, Abe also announced a 5-trillion yen stimulus package that aimed to mitigate any effects on economic revival. After the increase in April, Japan fell into recession during the second and third quarters of 2014, leading to Abe delaying the second stage of the tax rise until April 2017 and calling a snap election. In response to the recession, Aso announced that the government would ask the Diet to pass a supplementary budget to fund a further stimulus package worth 2–3 trillion yen.

There had been some division within the Abe cabinet between "fiscal hawks", such as Finance Minister Aso, who favored fiscal consolidation through spending cuts and tax increases, and deflationists, such as Abe himself, who argued in favor of a "growth first" policy that prioritizes economic expansion and recovery over budget considerations using the slogan "no fiscal health without economic revitalization". Abe's decision to delay the consumption tax increase in November 2014 and his push for a large fiscal deficit in the 2015 budget without social security cuts was interpreted as a victory for this faction within the LDP. The government did, however, commit to a primary surplus by 2020, and pledged to review its strategy in 2018 if the primary deficit had not fallen to 1 percent of GDP by that time.

==== "Third Arrow": Growth strategy and structural reform ====
On 15 March 2013, Abe announced that Japan was entering negotiations to join the Trans-Pacific Partnership (TPP). This was interpreted by analysts as a means through which the government could enact reforms to liberalize certain sectors of the Japanese economy, most notably agriculture, and was criticized by farm lobbies and some sections of the LDP. Economist Yoshizaki Tatsuhiko described the TPP as having the potential to act as the "linchpin of Abe's economic revitalization strategy" by making Japan more competitive through free trade. In February 2015, the Abe government struck a deal to limit the power of the JA-Zenchu body to supervise and audit Japan's agricultural co-operatives, in a move designed to facilitate TPP negotiations, improve the competitiveness of Japan's farming sector and curtail the influence of the agriculture lobby.

Abe revealed the first measures related to the "third arrow" policies in June 2013, which included plans to establish deregulated economic zones and allow the sale of drugs online, but did not include substantial measures related to the labor market or business reform. These measures were less well-received than the first two arrows had been since Abe took office, with the stock market falling slightly and critics arguing that they lacked detail; The Economist, for example, judged the announcement a "misfire". Analysts did note, however, that Abe was waiting until after the July Upper House elections to reveal further details, to avoid an adverse reaction by voters to potentially unpopular reforms. At the annual meeting of the World Economic Forum (WEF) in Davos in 2014, Abe announced that he was ready to act as a "drill bit" to break through the rock of vested interests and "red tape" to achieve structural reforms of the economy. He cited reforms in agriculture, energy and health sectors as evidence of this, and pledged to push forward with the TPP, a Japan–EU trade deal and tax, corporate governance and planning reforms.

Abe announced a package of structural reforms in June 2014, that The Economist described as "less a single arrow than a 1,000-strong bundle" and compared favorably to the 2013 announcement. These new measures included corporate governance reform, the easing of restrictions on hiring foreign staff in special economic zones, liberalizing the health sector, and measures to help foreign and local entrepreneurs. The plans also included a cut in corporation tax to below 30 percent, an expansion of childcare to encourage women to join the workforce, and the loosening of restrictions on overtime. In December 2015, the government announced corporation tax would be reduced to 29.97 percent in 2016, bringing the cut forward one year ahead of schedule.

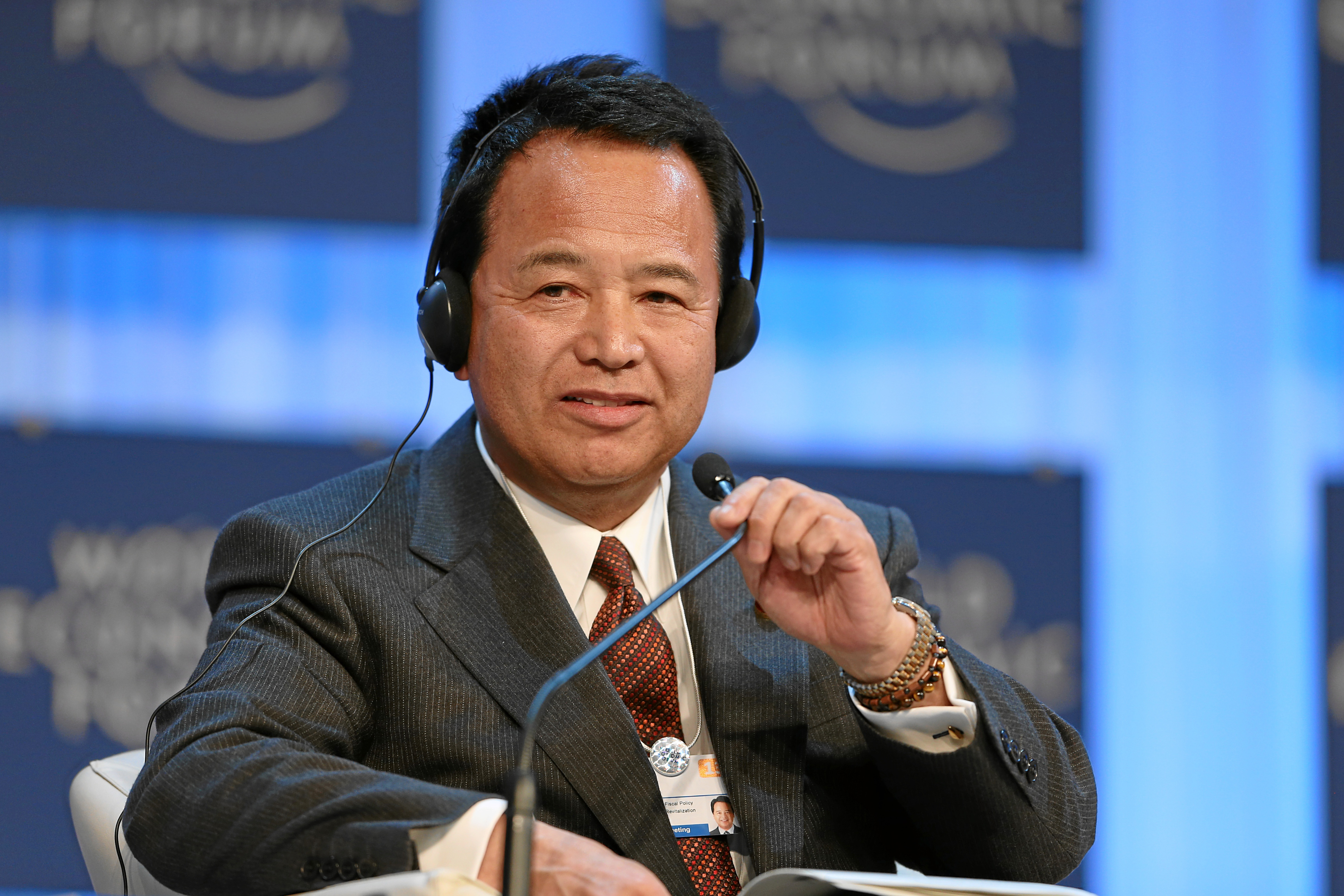
Akira Amari, who served as Abe's economy minister from 2012 to 2016, oversaw the "third arrow" growth strategy and negotiations to join the Trans-Pacific Partnership agreement.

In September 2013, Abe called for a "society in which all women can shine", setting a target that 30 percent of leadership positions should be held by women by 2020. Abe cited the "womenomics" ideas of Kathy Matsui that greater participation by women in the workforce, which is relatively low in Japan, especially in leadership roles, could improve Japan's GDP and potentially fertility rates, despite declining population figures. The Abe cabinet introduced measures to expand childcare and legislation to force public and private organizations to publish data on the number of women they employ and what positions they hold.

In November 2013, the Abe cabinet passed a bill to liberalize Japan's electricity market by abolishing price controls, breaking up regional monopolies, and separating power transmission from generation by creating a national grid company. This move was partly in response to the 2011 Fukushima disaster, and the bill faced little opposition in the Diet. By March 2015, more than 500 companies had applied to the Economy Ministry to enter the electricity retail market and the electricity industry was expected to be fully liberalized by 2016, with gas utilities expected to follow suit by 2017. Abe had also said he favored the rebuilding of Japan's nuclear reactors following the Fukushima disaster (though much of the authority to restart nuclear plants lies with local governments) and planned to strengthen relations with the United States.

==== 2013 Upper House election ====
When Abe returned to office, although neither party had controlled the House of Councillors (the upper house of the Diet) since the 2007 election, the opposition DPJ was the largest party. The governing coalition enjoyed a two-thirds majority in the lower house, allowing it to override the upper house's veto, but this requires a delay of 90 days. This situation, known as the "Twisted Diet", had contributed to political gridlock and the "revolving door" of prime ministers since 2007. Abe's campaign for the 2013 election focused on themes of economic revival, asking voters to give him a stable mandate in both houses to pursue reforms, and took a more moderate tone on defense and constitutional matters.

In the 2013 upper house election, the LDP emerged as the largest party with 115 seats (a gain of 31) and the Komeito with 20 (a gain of 1), giving Abe's coalition control of both houses of the Diet, but not the two-thirds majority in the upper house that would allow for constitutional revision. With no national elections due until 2016, this result was described as giving Abe the opportunity of "three golden years" of parliamentary stability in which to implement his policies.

==== Domestic policy ====
Abe's return to the prime ministership saw a renewed attempt to downplay Japan's wartime atrocities in school textbooks, an issue that had contributed to his earlier downfall. In 2013, Abe supported the creation of the Top Global University Project program. This is a ten-year program to increase international student attendance in Japanese universities and hire more foreign faculty. There is also funding for selected universities to create English-only undergraduate programs. In 2014, Abe allocated millions of dollars of the fiscal budget to help programs that help single individuals in Japan find potential mates. These programs entitled "Marriage support programs" were started in hopes of raising Japan's declining birthrate, which was half of what it was six decades prior.

==== Foreign policy ====
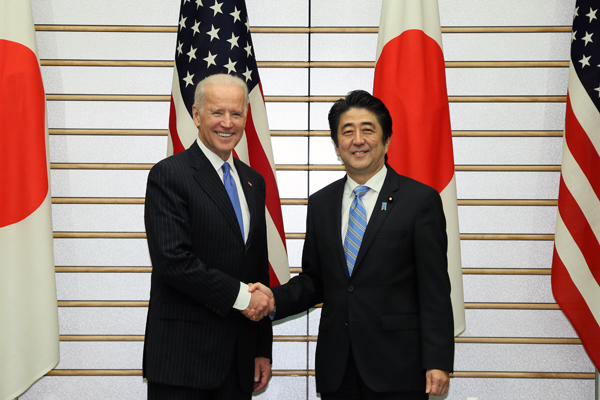
Abe with United States vice president Joe Biden in Tokyo, 2013

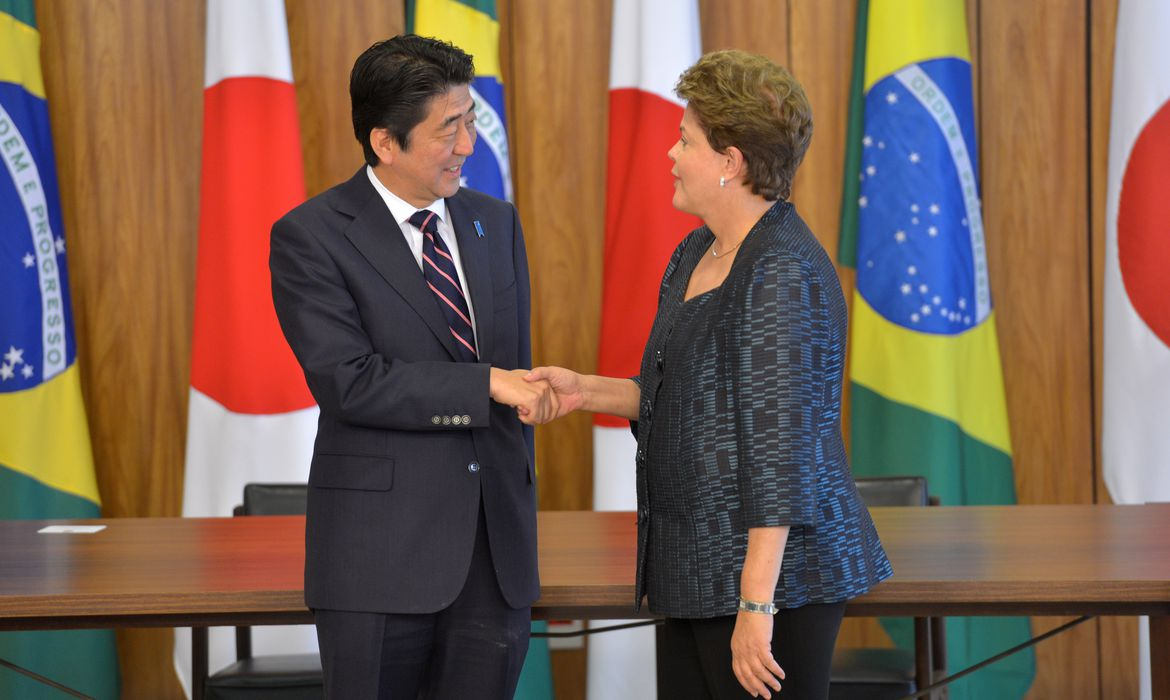
Abe with Brazilian president Dilma Rousseff in Brasília, 2014

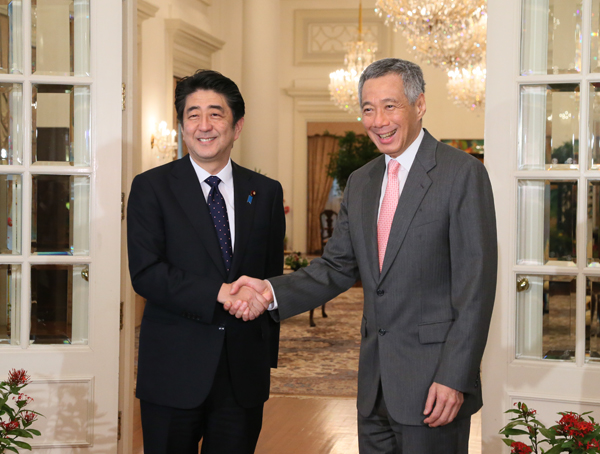
Abe with Singaporean prime minister Lee Hsien Loong at the Istana in Singapore, 2014

Shortly after taking office Abe signaled a "drastic reshaping" of foreign policy and promised to pursue diplomacy with a global, rather than a regional or bilateral outlook based on "the fundamental values of freedom, democracy, basic human rights, and the rule of law". His choice of Fumio Kishida as foreign minister was interpreted as a sign that he would pursue a more moderate line compared to his hawkish stance in the run-up to the general election. His first visit overseas after becoming prime minister once again was to various countries in Southeast Asia. Abe increased its allies in its international campaign to counter a North Korean nuclear threat. Abe often visited countries such as Singapore, Japan's largest Asian investor and vice-versa.

Within weeks of returning to power, the Second Abe cabinet faced the In Amenas hostage crisis of 2013 in which 10 Japanese citizens were killed. Abe believed that this incident demonstrated the need for the creation of a National Security Council, and convened a panel to consider its creation soon after the crisis.

Abe was unusually active in the field of foreign affairs for a Japanese prime minister, making visits to 49 countries between December 2012 and September 2014, a number that was described as "unprecedented" (by contrast, his immediate two predecessors Naoto Kan and Yoshihiko Noda visited a combined total of 18 countries between June 2010 and December 2012). This was interpreted as a means to offset poor relations with China and the Koreas by increasing Japan's profile on the world stage and improving bilateral ties with other countries in the region. Southeast Asian nations, Australia, and India were significant and frequent destinations for Abe, who visited all 10 ASEAN countries in his first year in office. The diplomatic tours also functioned as another element of Abenomics by promoting Japan to the international business community and opening up avenues for trade, energy, and defense procurement deals (for example, business executives often travel with Abe on these visits).

In September 2013, Abe intervened to aid Tokyo's bid to host the 2020 Summer Olympic and Paralympic Games, giving a speech in English at the IOC session in Buenos Aires, in which he extolled the role of sport in Japan and sought to reassure the committee that any ongoing issues with the Fukushima plant were under control. After the bid was successful, Abe sought to portray the games as symbolic of his Abenomics economic revitalization programme, saying, "I want to make the Olympics a trigger for sweeping away 15 years of deflation and economic decline."

Abe's foreign policy moved Japan away from its traditional focus on the "big three" bilateral relationships with the United States, China, and South Korea, and sought to increase Japan's international profile by expanding ties with NATO, the European Union, and other organizations beyond the Asia-Pacific region. Abe concluded the Japan–Australia Economic Partnership Agreement with Australia's Abbott government in 2014 and addressed a joint sitting of the Australian Parliament in July. He was the first Japanese PM to address the Australian parliament. In January 2014, Abe became the first Japanese leader to attend India's Republic Day Parade in Delhi as chief guest, during a three-day visit where he and Prime Minister Manmohan Singh agreed to increase co-operation over economic, defense and security issues and signed trade agreements related to energy, tourism and telecoms.

Relations between Japan and its immediate neighbors, China and South Korea, remained poor after Abe's return to office. While he declared that the "doors are always open on my side", no bilateral meetings between Abe and Chinese leadership took place for the first 23 months of his second term. Neither did Abe hold any meetings with President Park Geun-hye of South Korea during his 2012 to 2014 term of office. Both countries criticized Abe's visit to the Yasukuni Shrine in December 2013, with the Chinese foreign minister describing the action as moving Japan in an "extremely dangerous" direction. In addition China continued to criticize Abe's defense reform policies, warning that Japan should not abandon its post-war policy of pacifism. Abe's speech at the WEF in 2014 was interpreted as a criticism of Chinese foreign and defense policy when he said that "the dividends of growth in Asia must not be wasted on military expansion" and called for greater preservation of the freedom of the seas under the rule of law, although he did not specifically refer to any one country during his remarks. In November 2014, Abe met Chinese leader Xi Jinping at the APEC meeting in Beijing for the first time since either had taken office, after a photocall that was described as "awkward" by the press. Abe later told reporters that during the meeting he suggested establishing a hotline between Tokyo and Beijing to help resolve any maritime clashes and that the "first step" had been taken to improve relations.

==== Defense and security policy ====
Abe tried to centralize security policy in the prime minister's office by creating the National Security Council to better coordinate national security policy, and by ordering the first National Security Strategy in Japan's history. Based upon the American body of the same name, the law to create the NSC was passed in November 2013 and began operating the following month when Abe appointed Shotaro Yachi as Japan's first National Security Advisor. In December 2013, Abe announced a five-year plan of military expansion. He described this as "proactive pacificism", with the goal of making Japan a more "normal" country, able to defend itself.

In the same month, the Diet passed the Abe cabinet's State Secrecy Law, which took effect in December 2014. The law expanded the scope for the government to designate what information constitutes a state secret and increased penalties for bureaucrats and journalists who leak such information to up to 10 years in prison and a 10-million-yen fine. The passage of the law proved controversial, with thousands protesting the bill in Tokyo and the cabinet's approval rating falling below 50 percent for the first time in some polls. Detractors argued that the law was ambiguous and therefore gave the government too much freedom to decide which information to classify, that it could curtail freedom of the press, and that the cabinet had rushed the legislation without including any corresponding freedom of information guarantees. Abe argued that the law was necessary and applied only in cases of national security, diplomacy, public safety and counter-terrorism, saying, "If the law prevents films from being made, or weakens freedom of the press, I'll resign." However he did concede that, in retrospect, the government should have explained the details of the bill more carefully to the public.

In July 2014, the Abe cabinet decided to reinterpret Japan's constitution to allow for the right of "Collective Self-Defense". This would allow the Self Defense Forces to come to the aid of, and defend, an ally under attack, whereas the previous interpretation of the constitution was strictly pacifist and allowed for the force to be used only in absolute self-defence. The decision was supported by the United States, which has argued for greater scope for action by Japan as a regional ally, and led to a revision of the US-Japan defense cooperation guidelines in 2015.

==== 2014 cabinet reshuffle ====
The cabinet inaugurated in December 2012 was the longest-serving and most stable in post-war Japanese history, lasting 617 days without a change in personnel until Abe conducted a reshuffle in September 2014, with the stated aim of promoting more women into ministerial posts. The reshuffled cabinet tied the record of five women ministers set by the first Koizumi cabinet. Most key figures, such as Deputy Prime Minister Aso and Chief Cabinet Secretary Suga, were kept in their posts although Abe moved Justice Minister Sadakazu Tanigaki out of the cabinet to become Secretary-General of the LDP. However, on 20 October two of the women promoted in the reshuffle, Justice Minister Midori Matsushima and Trade Minister Yūko Obuchi, were forced to resign in separate election finance scandals. Abe told the press, "As prime minister, I bear full responsibility for having appointed them, and I apologize deeply to the people of Japan."

==== 2014 general election ====
Abe giving a speech in front of the Gundam Cafe in Akihabara, 2014

In November 2014, while Abe was attending the APEC forum meeting in China and the G20 Summit in Australia, rumors began appearing in the press that he was planning to call a snap election in the event that he decided to delay the second stage of the consumption tax increase. It was speculated that Abe planned to do this to "reset" Diet business after it had become gridlocked due to the fallout from ministerial resignations in October, or because the political situation would be less favorable to re-election in 2015 and 2016.

On 17 November, GDP figures were released that showed Japan had fallen into recession as per the two-quarters of negative growth following the first stage of the consumption tax rise in April. Abe held a press conference on 21 November and announced that he was delaying the rise in the consumption tax by 18 months, from October 2015 to April 2017, and calling a snap general election for 14 December. Abe described the election as the "Abenomics Dissolution" and asked the voters to pass judgment on his economic policies. The opposition parties attempted to field a united front in opposition to Abe's policies, but found themselves divided on them.

In the 2014 general election, the LDP won 291 seats, a loss of 3, but the Komeito gained 4 to win 35. Therefore, the governing coalition maintained its two-thirds majority in a slightly reduced lower house of 475.

=== Third Cabinet (2014–2017) ===
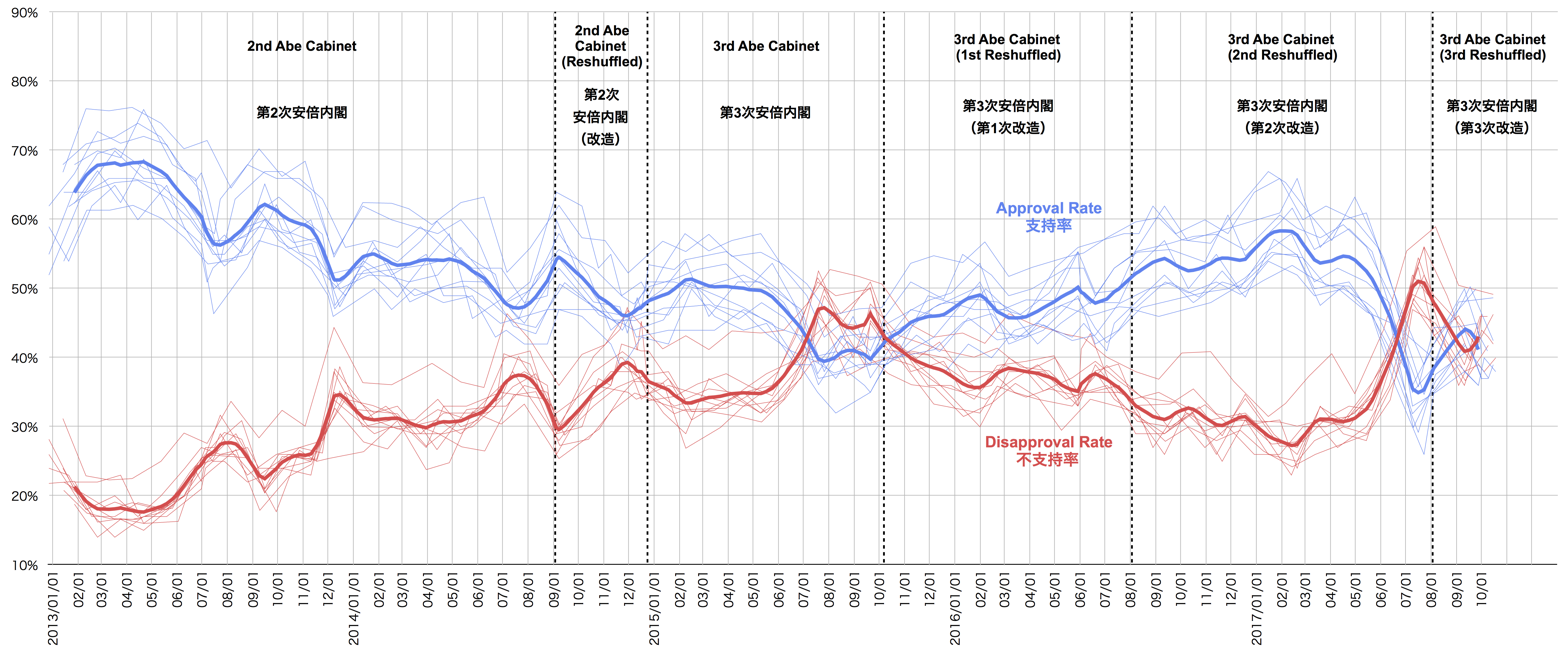
Abe Cabinet approval ratings from 2012 to 2017

On 24 December 2014, Abe was re-elected to the position of prime minister by the House of Representatives. The only change he made when introducing his third cabinet was replacing defense minister Akinori Eto, who was also involved in a political funding controversy, with Gen Nakatani. In his February policy speech, as the Cabinet weathered a Moritomo Gakuen school scandal, Abe called upon the new Diet to enact "most drastic reforms since the end of World War II" in the sectors of the economy, agriculture, healthcare and others.

==== Foreign policy ====
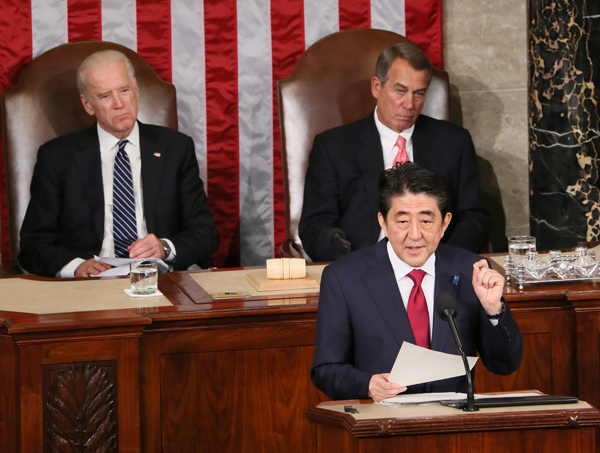
Abe addressing the United States Congress, 2015

On a tour of the Middle East in January 2015, Abe announced that Japan would provide 200 million dollars in non-military assistance to countries fighting against the Islamic State of Iraq and the Levant as part of a 2.5-billion-dollar aid package. Shortly after this, ISIL released a video in which a masked figure (identified as Mohammed Emwazi or "Jihadi John") threatened to kill two Japanese hostages, Kenji Goto and Haruna Yukawa, in retaliation for the move unless Abe's government paid 200 million dollars of ransom money. Abe cut short his trip to deal with the crisis, declared that such acts of terrorism were "unforgivable" and promised to save the hostages while refusing to pay the ransom. The Abe cabinet worked with the Jordanian government to attempt to secure the release of both hostages, after further videos were released by ISIL linking their fate to that of the pilot Muath al-Kasasbeh, with deputy foreign minister Yasuhide Nakayama conducting negotiations in Amman. Both hostages were killed with ISIL releasing news of Yukawa's death on 24 January and Goto's on 31 January. Abe condemned the killings as a "heinous act", declared that Japan would "not give in to terrorism" and pledged to work with the international community to bring the killers to justice. There was some criticism of Abe for his move to pledge aid against ISIL while they were holding Japanese citizens hostage, but polls showed support for his administration increasing in the aftermath of the crisis. He later used the example of the hostage crisis to argue the case for the collective self-defense legislation that his government introduced in the summer of 2015.

In April 2015, Abe addressed a joint session of the United States Congress, the first Japanese prime minister to do so. In his speech he referred to the Japan–US Alliance as the "Alliance of Hope", promised that Japan would play a more active security and defense role in the alliance and argued that the TPP would bring both economic and security benefits to the Asia-Pacific region. The address served as part of a state visit to the United States, the eighth of the Obama Presidency, which President Obama referred to as a "celebration of the ties of friendship" between America and Japan. During the visit, Abe attended a state dinner at the White House.

Like his predecessors Tomiichi Murayama and Junichiro Koizumi, Abe issued a statement commemorating the 70th anniversary of the end of World War II on 14 August 2015. This statement had been widely anticipated, with some commentators expecting Abe to amend or even refuse to repeat the previous leaders' apologies for Japan's role in the war. In the statement, Abe committed to upholding the previous apologies and expressed "profound grief and eternal, sincere condolences" for the "immeasurable damage and suffering" Japan had caused for "innocent people" during the conflict. He also argued that Japan should not be "predestined to apologize" forever, noting that more than eighty percent of Japanese people alive today were born after the conflict and played no part in it. The governments of both China and South Korea responded with criticism of the statement, but analysts noted that it was muted and restrained in tone, in comparison to the harsher rhetoric than had been employed previously. A representative of the US National Security Council welcomed the statement and referred to Japan as having been a "model for nations everywhere" in its record on "peace, democracy, and the rule of law" since the war's end. Professor Gerald Curtis of Columbia University argued that the statement "probably satisfies no constituency" either in Japan or abroad, but that by repeating the words "aggression", "colonialism", "apology" and "remorse" used in the Murayama Statement of 1995, it was likely to be enough to improve relations with China and Korea.

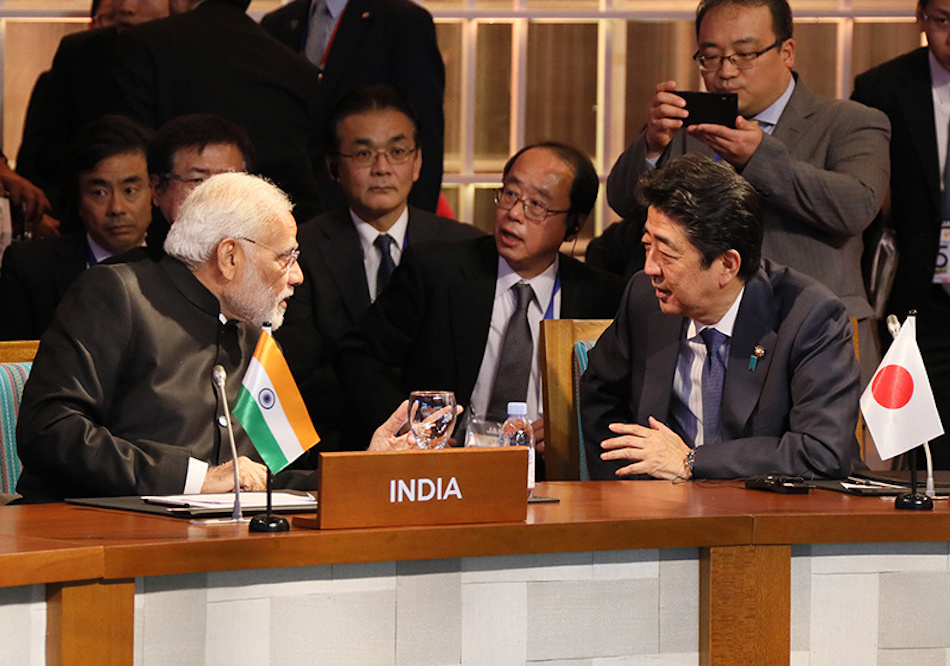
Abe with Indian prime minister Narendra Modi at the Regional Comprehensive Economic Partnership summit, 2017

In Seoul in November 2015, Abe attended the first China–Japan–South Korea trilateral summit held for three years with Korean president Park Geun-hye and Chinese premier Li Keqiang. The summits had been suspended in 2012 due to tensions over historical and territorial issues. The leaders agreed to restore the summits as annual events, negotiate a trilateral free trade agreement, and work to check North Korea's nuclear weapons programme. They also announced that trilateral co-operation had been "completely restored". In December 2015, Abe and Indian prime minister Narendra Modi signed deals in which India agreed to buy Shinkansen technology from Japan (financed in part by a loan from the Japanese government), and for Japan to be raised to full partner status in the Malabar naval exercises. Also agreed at the talks was a proposal for Japan to sell non-military nuclear technology to India, to be formally signed once technical details were finalized.

Japan's relations with South Korea improved somewhat during Abe's third term, in the aftermath of Abe's war anniversary statement. Abe and South Korea's president Park Geun-hye held their first bilateral meeting in November 2015, where they agreed to resolve the "comfort women" dispute, which Park described as the biggest obstacle to closer ties. In late December 2015, foreign ministers Fumio Kishida and Yun Byung-se announced in Seoul that a deal had been reached to resolve the comfort women dispute, in which Japan agreed to pay 1 billion yen (US$8.3 million) into a fund to support the 46 surviving victims, and issued a statement that contained Abe's "most sincere apologies and remorse". Abe later telephoned Park. In return, the South Korean government agreed to consider the matter "finally and irreversibly resolved" and work to remove a statue in front of the Japanese embassy in Seoul. Both sides agreed to refrain from criticizing each other over the issue in the future. President Park stated that the agreement would be a "new starting point" for relations between the two countries, although both leaders received some domestic criticism: Abe for issuing the apology, and Park for accepting the deal.

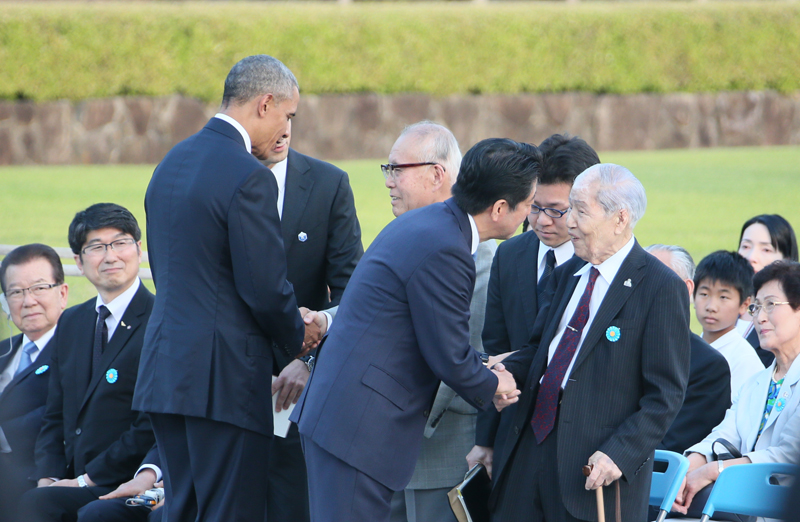
Abe with Obama at the Hiroshima Peace Memorial, 2016

On 27 May 2016, Abe accompanied Barack Obama when he became the first sitting US president to visit Hiroshima, 71 years after the US atomic bombing of the city towards the end of World War II. The two paid tribute to the victims of the bombing at the Hiroshima Peace Memorial Museum, during the visit both leaders pledged to promote nuclear disarmament. On 27 December 2016, Abe paid a reciprocal visit to USS Arizona Memorial, Honolulu. The Abe government and the Japanese public mistakenly thought Abe's visit of Honolulu was unprecedented. Abe's visit drew public attention for the first time to the three quiet visits to Honolulu by Japanese prime ministers in 1951, 1956, and 1957.

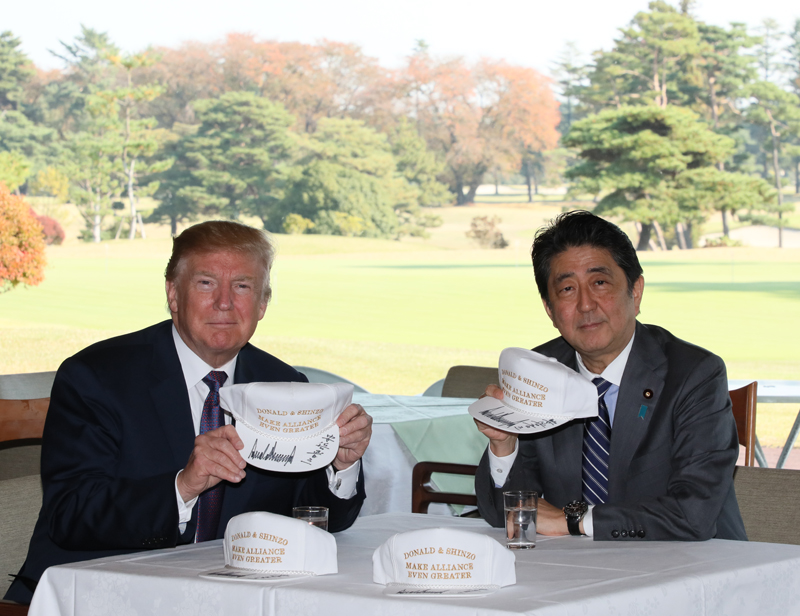
Abe and US president Donald Trump in 2017 with hats reading "Donald & Shinzo, Make Alliance Even Greater"

Shortly after Donald Trump had won the US presidential election, Abe cut short his presence at an Asia-Pacific Economic Cooperation summit being held in Lima, Peru, in order to have an informal, impromptu meeting with the then president-elect at the Trump Tower. After Trump's inauguration, they had a formal meeting at Mar-a-Lago in Palm Beach, Florida, at which they discussed security in light of a North Korean threat, with Abe stating that Japan would be more committed to Japan–United States relations.

==== Security and defense issues ====
In his April speech to the US Congress, Abe announced that his government would "enact all necessary bills by this coming summer" to expand the Self-Defense Forces' capacity for operations and to give effect to the cabinet's July 2014 decision to reinterpret the constitution in favor of collective self-defense. The Abe cabinet then introduced 11 bills making up the Legislation for Peace and Security into the Diet in May 2015, which pushed for a limited expansion of military powers to fight in a foreign conflict. The principal aims of the bills were to allow Japan's Self-Defense Forces to come to the aid of allied nations under attack (even if Japan itself was not) in an "existential crisis situation", to expand their scope to support international peacekeeping operations, and to allow for Japan to take on a greater share of security responsibilities as part of the US-Japan Alliance.

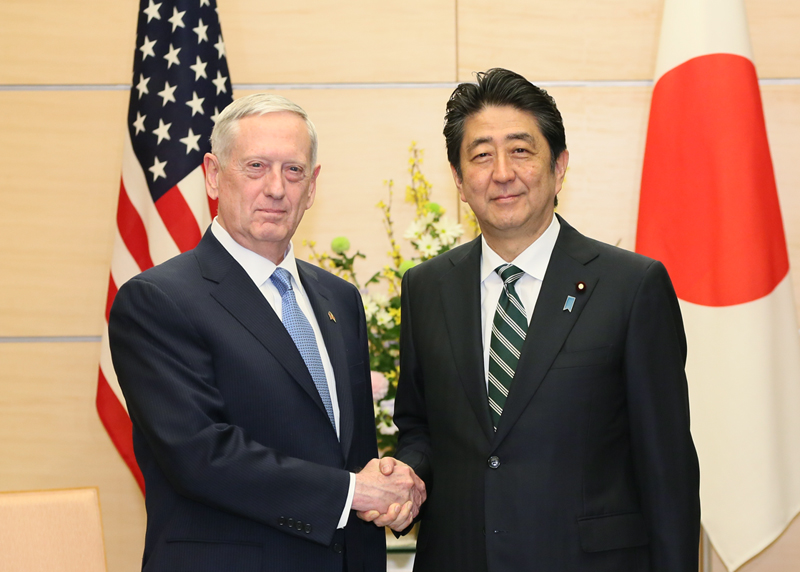
Abe with US secretary of defense Jim Mattis in 2017

To allow for enough time to pass the bills in the face of lengthy opposition scrutiny, the Abe cabinet extended the Diet session by 95 days from June into September, making it the longest in the post-war era. The bills passed the House of Representatives on 16 July with the support of the majority LDP-Komeito coalition. Diet members from the opposition parties walked out of the vote in protest at what they said was the government's move to force the bills through without sufficient debate. Abe countered by arguing that the bills had been debated for "as many as 113 hours" before the vote. A government using its majority to "railroad" controversial bills through the Diet in the face of political and public opposition is a subject of criticism in Japan. As a result of these moves, Abe faced a public backlash, and opinion polls showed that his approval ratings fell into negative figures for the first time since he returned to power in 2012. Many protested outside the Diet buildings, denouncing what was referred to as "war bills" by opponents. The security bills were finally approved by the House of Councillors, 148 votes to 90, and became law on 19 September.

In December 2015, the Abe government announced the creation of a new intelligence unit, the International Counterterrorism Intelligence Collection Unit, to aid counter-terrorism operations, to be based in the Foreign Ministry but led by the prime minister's office. This was reported as being part of efforts to step up security measures in preparation for the 2016 G7 Summit in Shima, Mie, and 2020 Olympics in Tokyo. In the same month the cabinet approved Japan's largest-ever defense budget, at 5.1 trillion yen (US$45 billion), for the fiscal year beginning in April 2016. The package included funding intended for the purchase of three "Global Hawk" drones, six F-35 fighter jets, and a Boeing KC-46A midair refueling aircraft.

==== Re-election as LDP president and "Abenomics 2.0" ====
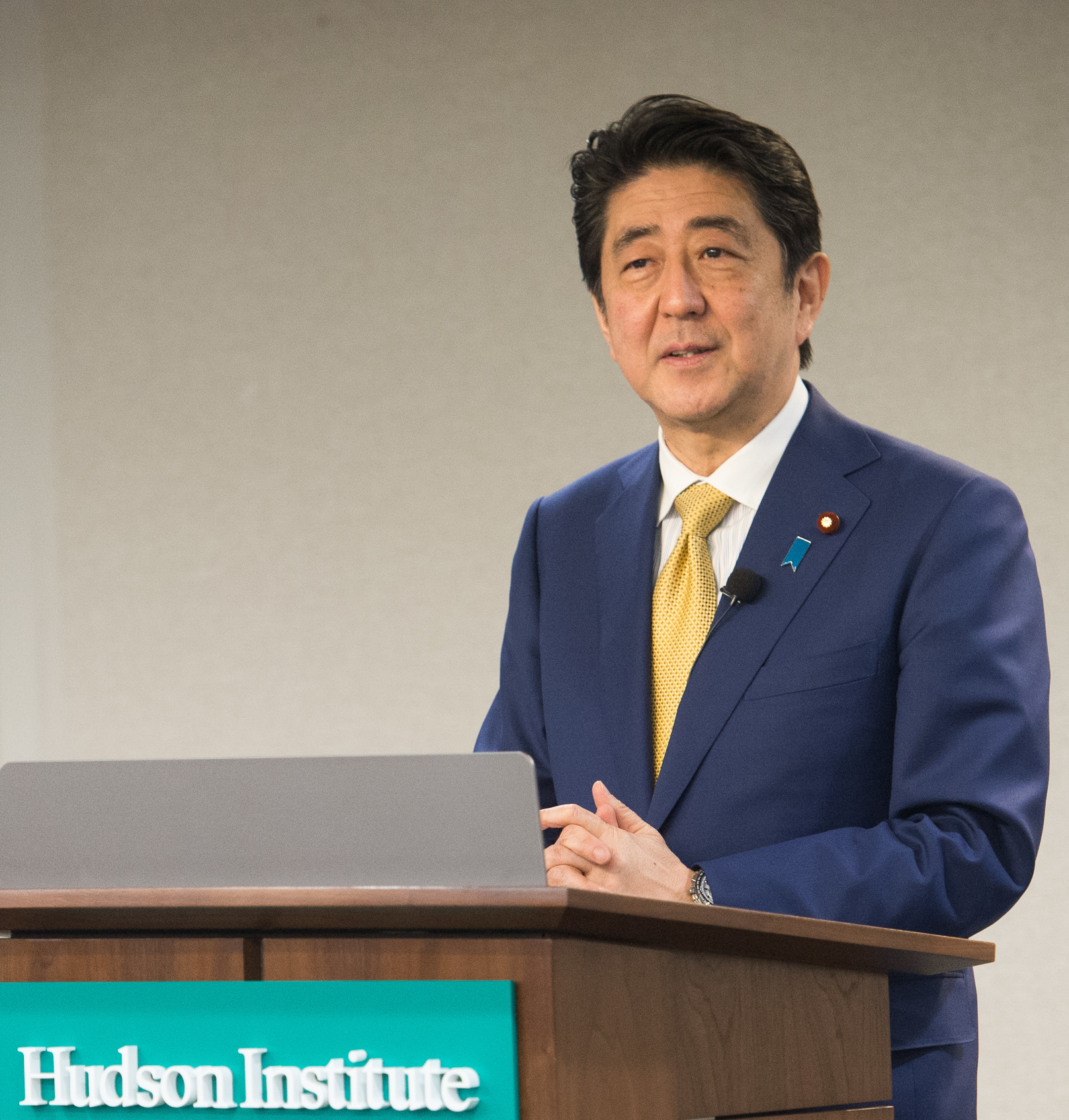
Abe speaking at the Hudson Institute in Washington, D.C., 2016

In September 2015, Abe was re-elected as president of the LDP in an uncontested election. Following this Abe carried out a cabinet reshuffle, once again keeping the key ministers of Finance, Economy, Foreign Affairs, and the Chief Cabinet Secretary in post. He also created a new ministerial position for the coordination of policies related to the economy, population decline, and social security reform, which was filled by Katsunobu Katō.

At a press conference after his official re-election as LDP president, Abe announced that the next stage of his administration would focus on what he called "Abenomics 2.0", the aim of which was to tackle issues of low fertility and an aging population and create a society "in which each and every one of Japan's 100 million citizens can take on active roles". This new policy consisted of targets which Abe referred to as "three new arrows"; to boost Japan's GDP to 600 trillion yen by 2021, to raise the national fertility rate from an average of 1.4 to 1.8 children per woman and stabilize the population at 100 million, and to create a situation where people would not have to leave employment to care for elderly relatives by the mid-2020s. Abe explained that the government would take measures to increase wages, boost consumption, and expand childcare, social security and care services for the elderly to meet these goals.

This new iteration of Abenomics was met with some criticism by commentators, who argued that it was not yet clear if the first three arrows had succeeded in lifting Japan out of deflation (inflation was some way below the 2 percent target), that the new arrows were merely presented as targets without the necessary policies to meet them, and that the targets themselves were unrealistic. However, opinion polls during the final months of 2015 showed the Abe cabinet's approval ratings once again climbing into positive figures after the change in emphasis back to economic issues.

Abe led the conclusion of the Trans-Pacific Partnership talks in early October 2015. In December 2015, the two parties making up Abe's governing coalition agreed to introduce a reduced rate of consumption tax for food when the anticipated tax increase from 8 to 10 percent takes place in April 2017. Abe dismissed the chairman of the LDP's tax panel Takeshi Noda (who opposed the reduction), and appointed Yoichi Miyazawa, who was more favorable to the policy, as his replacement.

==== Constitutional revision ====
At the 2016 election to the House of Councillors, the first that allowed Japanese citizens 18 and over to vote, Abe led the LDP–Komeito pact to victory, with the coalition being the largest in the House of Councillors since it was set at 242 seats. The election's results opened the debate on constitutional reform, particularly in amending Article 9 of Japan's pacifist constitution, with pro-revisionist parties gaining the two-thirds majority being necessary for reform, alongside a two-thirds majority in the House of Representatives, which would ultimately lead to a nationwide referendum. Abe remained relatively quiet on the issue for the remainder of the year, but in May 2017, announced that the constitutional reform would be in effect by 2020.

=== Fourth Cabinet (2017–2020) ===
The 2017 general election was held on 22 October. Prime Minister Abe called the snap election on 25 September, while the North Korea crisis was prominent in the news media. Abe was expected to retain a majority of seats in the Diet. Abe's ruling coalition took almost a majority of the vote and two-thirds of the seats.

==== Re-election as LDP president ====
On 20 September 2018, Abe was re-elected as leader of the main ruling Liberal Democratic Party. On 19 November 2019, Abe became Japan's longest-serving prime minister, surpassing the 2,883-day record of Katsura Tarō. On 24 August 2020, Abe became the longest-serving prime minister in terms of consecutive days in office, surpassing Eisaku Satō's 2,798-day record.

==== Favoritism scandals ====
In March 2018, it was revealed that the finance ministry (with finance minister Tarō Asō at its head) had falsified documents presented to the parliament in relation to the Moritomo Gakuen scandal, in order to remove 14 passages implicating Abe. Further accusations arose the same year that Abe had given preferential treatment to his friend Kotarō Kake to open a veterinary department at his school, Kake Gakuen. Abe denied the charges, but support for his administration fell below 30% in the polls, the lowest since his taking power in 2012. The scandal was referred to by some as "Abegate".

The scandals, while not damaging his political standing permanently, did little good for his image. In July 2018, Abe's public standing was further hit after he held a drinking party with LDP lawmakers during the peak of the floods in western Japan. In 2020, Abe came under further criticism for extending the term of top Tokyo prosecutor Hiromu Kurokawa, who later resigned amid a gambling scandal. Abe's approval rating fell from 40% to 27% during the month of May 2020, largely due to his handling of the Kurokawa situation.

==== Foreign policy ====
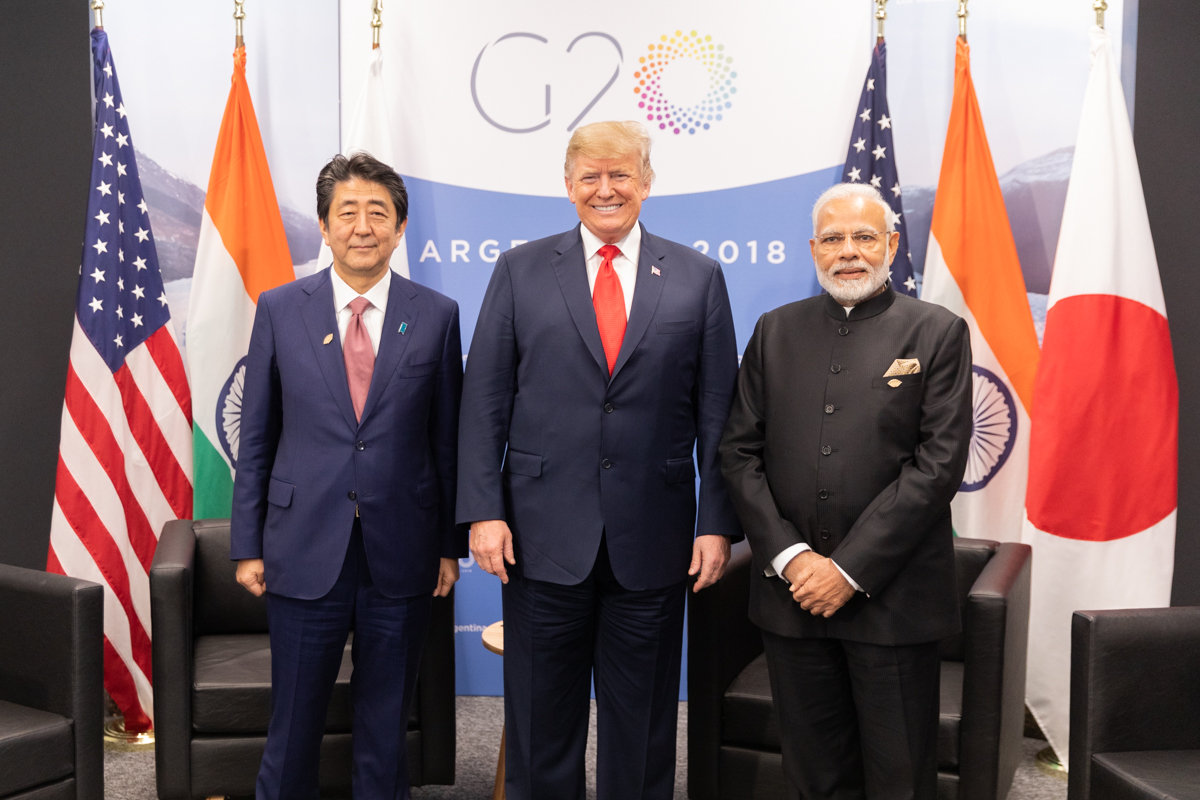
Abe with U.S. President Donald Trump and Indian Prime Minister Narendra Modi at the G20 summit in Buenos Aires, 30 November 2018

Abe supported the 2018 North Korea–United States summit. Abe, however, cautioned President Trump not to compromise on North Korea's missile program and leave Japan exposed to short-range missiles or relieve pressure on North Korea too soon before complete denuclearization. Reports in 2019 revealed that Abe authorized covering up information about two missing people from Japan living in North Korea.

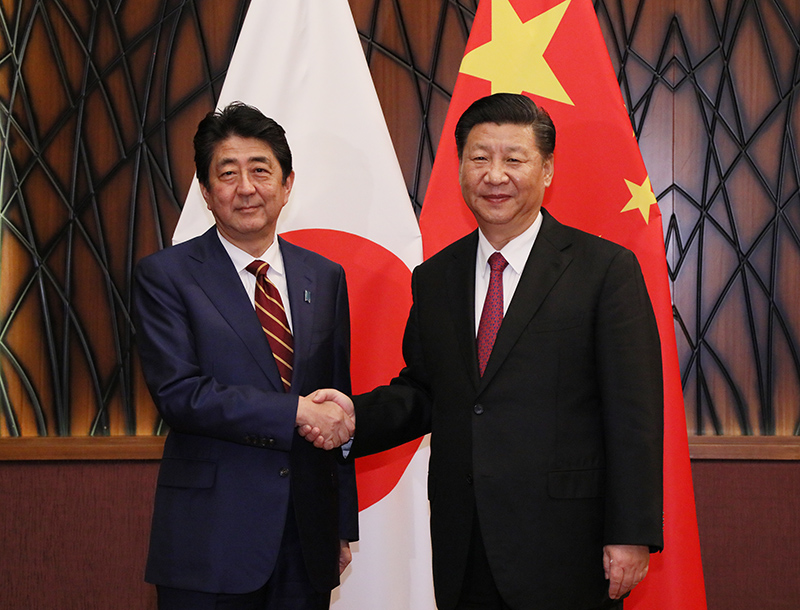
Abe with CCP General Secretary and Chinese President Xi Jinping in November 2017.

In 2018, Abe paid a formal visit to China, in the hopes of improving foreign relations, where he had several meetings with Chinese leader Xi Jinping. Abe stated that he hoped Xi Jinping would visit Japan to cultivate better relations between the two countries. At the G20 Summit. Abe told Xi it is important for "a free and open Hong Kong to prosper under the 'one country, two systems' policy".

Regarding the territorial dispute with Russia, Abe adopted the "two plus alpha" approach, altering the previous governments' position that Habomai, Shikotan, Etorofu and Kunashiri islands be returned to Japan's sovereign. In a 2021 interview, Abe spoke about his negotiation with the Russian president Vladimir Putin in 2018, also confirming he had requested Fumio Kishida to continue with this approach, to avoid worsening Japan's relations with Russia.

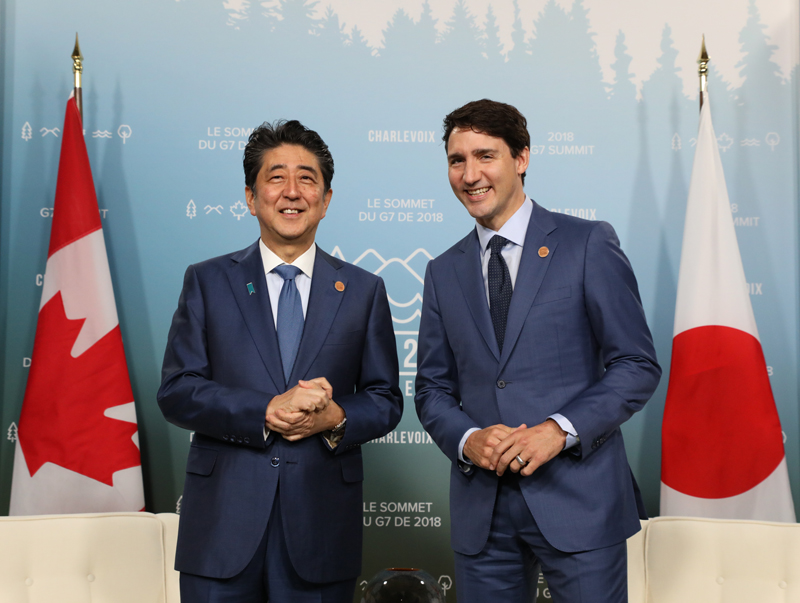
Abe with Canadian Prime Minister Justin Trudeau in June 2018

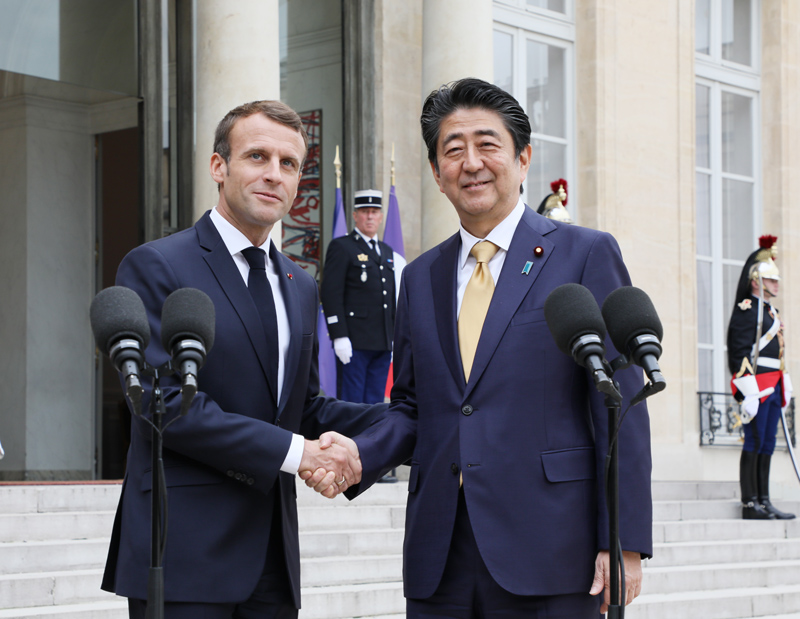
Abe with French President Emmanuel Macron in October 2018

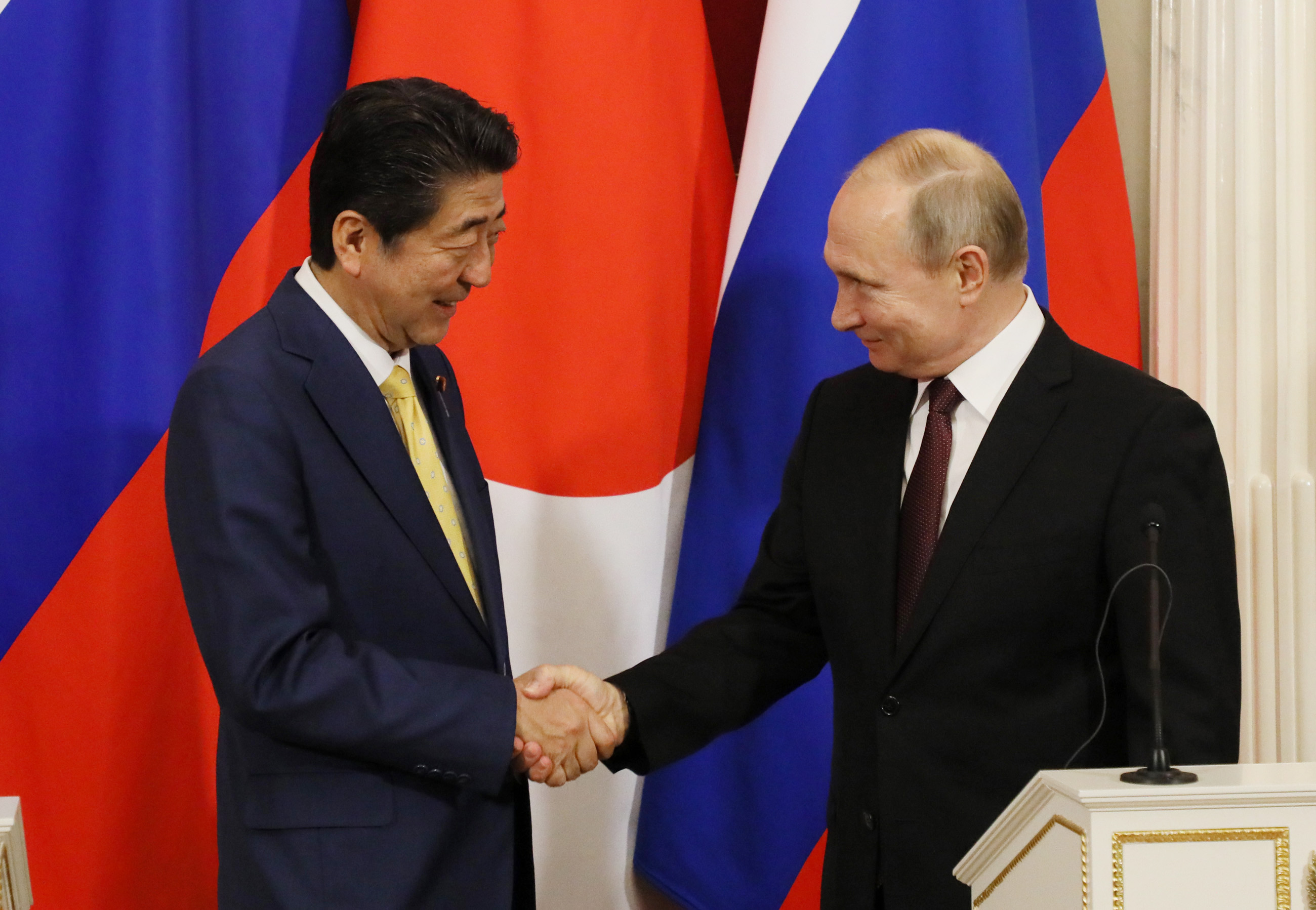
Abe with Russian President Vladimir Putin in January 2019

Japan's relations with South Korea further deteriorated starting from 2018, when, while negotiating a "comfort women" deal with then South Korean president Moon Jae-in, Abe demanded that South Korea remove statues of comfort women that had been installed in South Korea, the United States, Australia, and Germany. In late 2018, the Supreme Court of Korea and other high courts ordered several Japanese companies to make compensations to the families of Koreans who were unfairly treated and illegally forced to supply labor for World War II war efforts. The Japanese government protested these decisions, Abe argued that any issues concerning Japan's rule of Korea were previously resolved in the Treaty on Basic Relations which normalized relations between Japan and South Korea, adding that further requests of reparations meant that South Korea had violated the treaty. In August 2019, Abe's cabinet approved the removal of South Korea from Japan's trade "whitelist"; the subsequent trade dispute between South Korea and Japan causeing a significant deterioration in Japan–South Korea relations.

==== Economic policy ====
In July 2018, Japan became the second country after Mexico to ratify the Comprehensive and Progressive Agreement for Trans-Pacific Partnership (CPTPP). CPTPP evolved from the Trans-Pacific Partnership which never came into force after then US president Donald Trump withdrew the United States from the agreement in early 2017. Abe's administration was credited with overcoming protectionist pressures within Japan and rallying the 10 other TPP member countries to support CPTPP, which largely kept the previous agreement intact and left the door open to an eventual US return.

==== Resignation ====
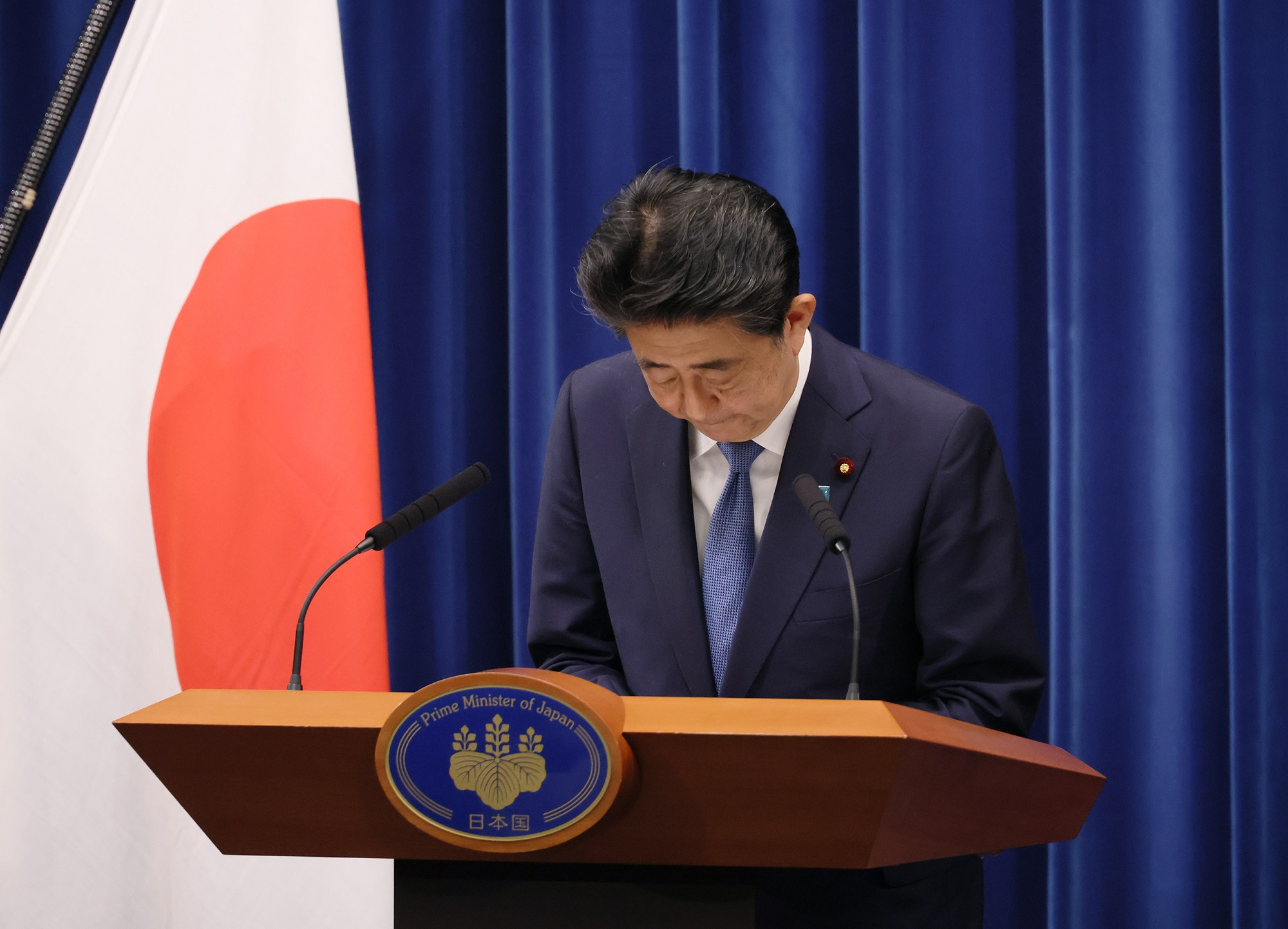
Abe bowing after announcing his resignation during a press conference in Tokyo, August 2020

Abe's colitis relapsed in June 2020 and resulted in his health deteriorating through the summer. Following several hospital visits, Abe announced on 28 August 2020 that he intended to retire as prime minister, citing his inability to carry out the duties of the office while seeking treatment for his condition. During the press conference announcing his retirement, Abe indicated that he would remain in office until a successor was chosen by the LDP, but declined to endorse any specific successor. Abe expressed regret at being unable to fully accomplish his policy goals due to his early retirement. Chief cabinet secretary Yoshihide Suga was elected as his successor by the LDP on 14 September 2020 and took office as prime minister on 16 September. In retirement, Abe was not as active as before. He continued to give interviews sporadically, such as the career retrospective on 19 July 2021, he gave to H.R. McMaster of the Hoover Institute.

== Assassination ==
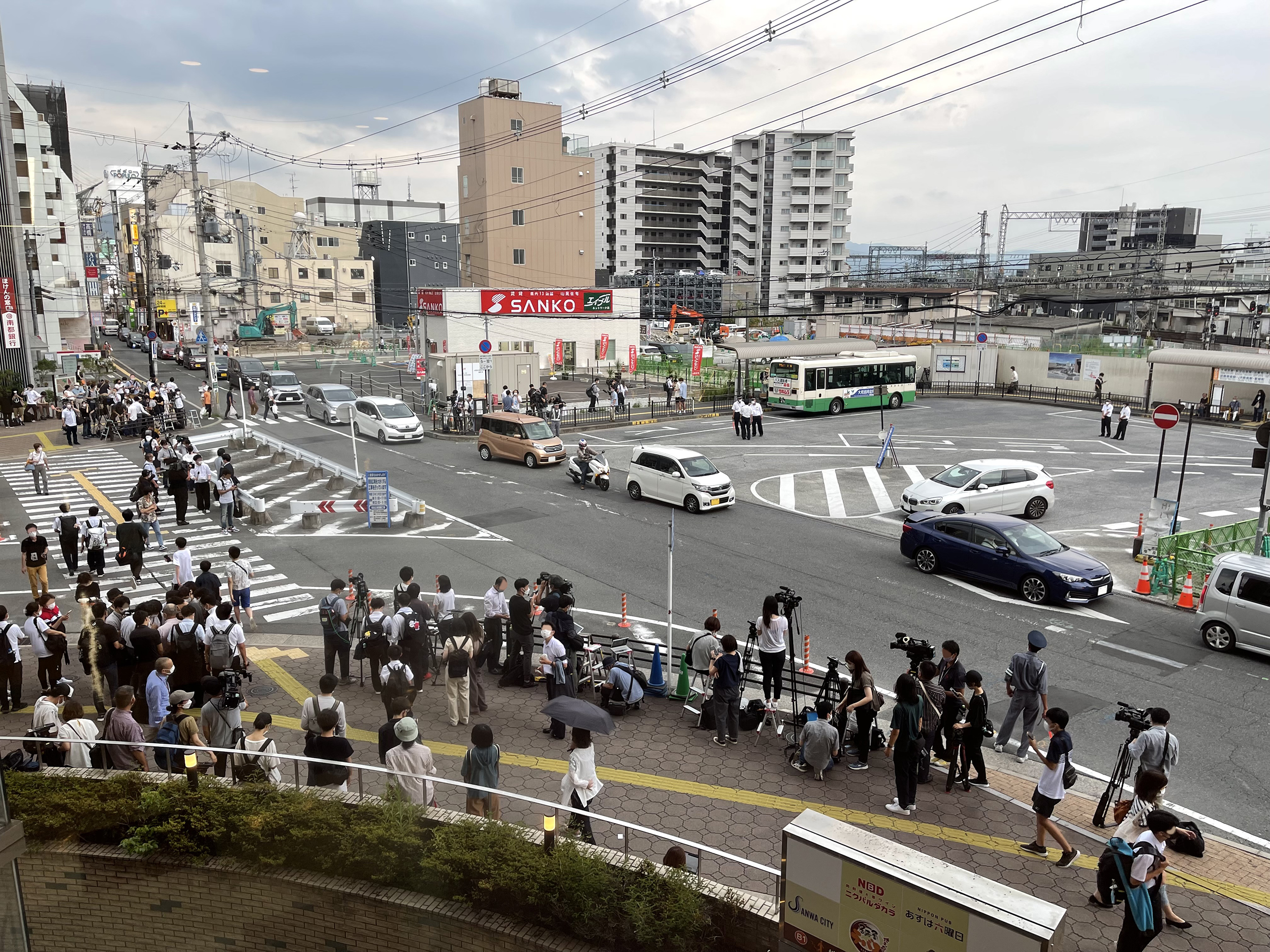
The site of Abe's assassination on 8 July 2022, just hours after the shooting

On 8 July 2022, at around 11:30 JST, Abe was shot and mortally wounded while he was delivering a campaign speech at the Yamato-Saidaiji Station, Nara. He was supporting fellow LDP party member Kei Satō for the House of Councillors election. The assassin approached Abe from behind and fired two shots using an improvised firearm. The first shot missed and prompted Abe to turn around, at which point a second shot was fired, hitting Abe in the right front of the neck and the left upper arm. He was fatally struck in an artery near the heart.

Abe was rushed to the Nara Medical University Hospital in Kashihara by helicopter. Prior to his arrival at the hospital, Abe had already shown no vital signs. Despite a transfusion of 100 units of blood (≈ 30 liters), the blood loss was too great and attempts to resuscitate Abe failed; he died there aged 67 at 17:03 JST.

A 41-year-old man named Tetsuya Yamagami, a former JMSDF member, was immediately arrested and later confessed to local police. Yamagami said he held a grudge against the Unification Church and shot Abe because "the religious group and Abe were connected". Yamagami said his mother had been brainwashed by the religious group, giving the church all of his family's money and leaving them so destitute that he and his siblings often did not have enough to eat. They became so despondent, he added, that his brother had committed suicide and he himself had attempted it.

Yamagami had been trying to kill Hak Ja Han of the Unification Church since around 2002, but gave up because he could not get close to her, changing his target to Abe. Yamagami told investigators that he did not harbor any resentment for Abe's political beliefs, but had targeted him because he believed the former prime minister was responsible for spreading the religion in Japan. Abe and his family were known to have long-standing ties to the Unification Church, dating back to his grandfather Nobusuke Kishi; Abe himself had held speeches in support of the religious movement. According to research by Nikkan Gendai, half of the twenty members of the Fourth Abe Cabinet had connections to the Unification Church. The connection between the two groups was found peculiar by some as the South Korean-based Unification Church raised billions of dollars' worth of funds from its Japanese followers ("since the 1970s" most of the church's money has come from Japan), playing on feelings of "war guilt" towards Korea, while Abe was famous for his proudly unapologetic embrace of Japan's imperial past and denial of any oppression of Koreans.

In response to the shooting and his subsequent death, numerous present and former world leaders expressed their sympathies and support for Abe. His body was returned to Tokyo the day after his assassination and his state funeral took place on 27 September 2022. Yamagami was tried and convicted of Abe's murder, and sentenced to life imprisonment on 21 January 2026.

== Political positions ==
Some have described Abe as a right-wing Japanese nationalist. In a 1996 book he co-wrote with two other lawmakers, Abe credits his grandfather Nobusuke Kishi as the source of his conservatism. In his memoir Towards a Beautiful Country, he writes that "A strong state is not a potential threat to political liberty that must be restrained by constitutionalism and civil society. It is the ultimate guarantor of national independence in a dangerous world governed by the law of the jungle". While accepting that strong states might be used against its citizens, he rejects the view that oppression is inherent in strong states but is instead caused by "closed governments" dominated by a small number of people.

=== Historical negationism ===
Some have claimed that Abe often engaged in historical negationism via his membership in Nippon Kaigi, especially in regard to Japanese war crimes during World War II. According to some analysts, this caused Japan's relations with South Korea and China to deteriorate under his premiership. In China, Abe's legacy remains mixed. While he was often criticized as an extreme nationalist, others also recognized his efforts for reconciliation between the two countries. Since 1997, as the bureau chief of the "Institute of Junior Assembly Members Who Think About the Outlook of Japan and History Education", Abe led the Society for History Textbook Reform. Abe was affiliated with the ultra-conservative, revisionist organization Nippon Kaigi (Japan Conference).

According to Alexis Dudden, a professor of history at the University of Connecticut who specializes in modern Japan and Korea, in the 1990s when Abe first became a parliamentarian he is believed to have co-authored a document denying the Nanjing Massacre; the article used to be available in Japan's Diet archives but has since disappeared. Abe also made comments that denied the occurrence of the massacre. Dudden has said Nanjing Massacre denial is akin to Holocaust denial.

On 1 March 2007, Abe denied to reporters that Japan forced women into sexual slavery during World War II, claiming that there was "no evidence" for that. He elaborated that he meant "forcible in the narrow sense of the word". On 26 March 2007, he apologized, saying: "I express my sympathy toward the comfort women and apologize for the situation they found themselves in". On his official homepage, he questioned the extent to which coercion was applied toward the comfort women, dismissing South Korean positions on the issue as foreign interference in Japanese domestic affairs; Abe's position towards the comfort women caused deteriorations of relations between Japan and South Korea. In a Diet session on 6 October 2006, Abe revised his statement regarding comfort women and said that he accepted the report issued in 1993 by the sitting cabinet secretary, Yōhei Kōno, wherein the Japanese government officially acknowledged the issue. Later in the session, Abe stated his belief that Class-A war criminals are not criminals under Japan's domestic law.

In a meeting of the Lower House Budget Committee in February 2006, Abe said, "There is a problem as to how to define aggressive wars; we cannot say it is decided academically", and "It is not the business of the government to decide how to define the last world war. I think we have to wait for the estimation of historians".

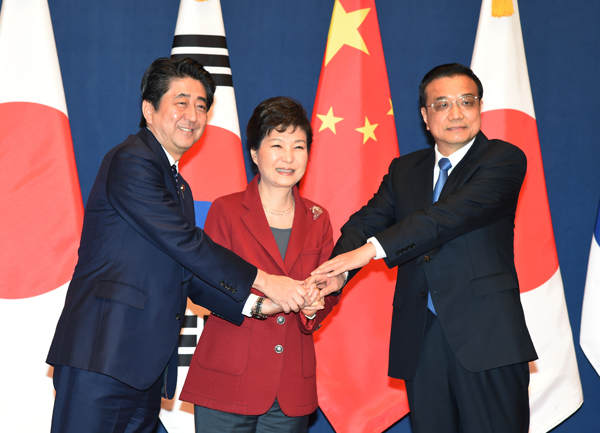
Abe with Park Geun-hye and Li Keqiang at the 2015 China–Japan–South Korea trilateral summit

Abe published a book called Toward a Beautiful Nation (美しい国へ, Utsukushii kuni e) in July 2006, which became a bestseller in Japan. The South Korean and Chinese governments, as well as noted academics and commentators, voiced concern about Abe's historical views.

In March 2007, in response to a United States Congress resolution introduced by Mike Honda, Abe denied any government coercion in the recruitment of comfort women during World War II. This was in line with a statement made almost 10 years earlier, in which Abe voiced his opposition to the inclusion of the subject of military prostitution in several school textbooks while denying any coercion in the "narrow" sense of the word, environmental factors notwithstanding. This statement provoked negative reactions in Asian and western countries; a New York Times editorial on 6 March 2007 commented for instance:

What part of 'Japanese Army sex slaves' does Japan's prime minister, Shinzo Abe, have so much trouble understanding and apologizing for?… These were not commercial brothels. Force, explicit and implicit, was used in recruiting these women. What went on in them was serial rape, not prostitution. The Japanese Army's involvement is documented in the government's own defense files. A senior Tokyo official more or less apologized for this horrific crime in 1993… Yesterday, [Abe] grudgingly acknowledged the 1993 quasi-apology, but only as part of a pre-emptive declaration that his government would reject the call, now pending in the United States Congress, for an official apology. America isn't the only country interested in seeing Japan belatedly accept full responsibility. [South] Korea and China are also infuriated by years of Japanese equivocations over the issue.

A 2007 Washington Post editorial, "Shinzo Abe's Double Talk", also criticized him: "he's passionate about Japanese victims of North Korea—and blind to Japan's own war crimes". In The New York Times in 2014, an editorial called Abe a "nationalist" who was a profound threat to American–Japanese relations, and an opinion piece labeled Abe's position on the subject of comfort women a "war on truth". The same editorial presented him as a revisionist, a view largely accepted by the international and part of the Japanese press. Writing in the London Review of Books, political scientist Edward Luttwak called Abe a "pragmatic Japanese Tory driving through reforms at home, while weaving an alliance aimed at containing China".

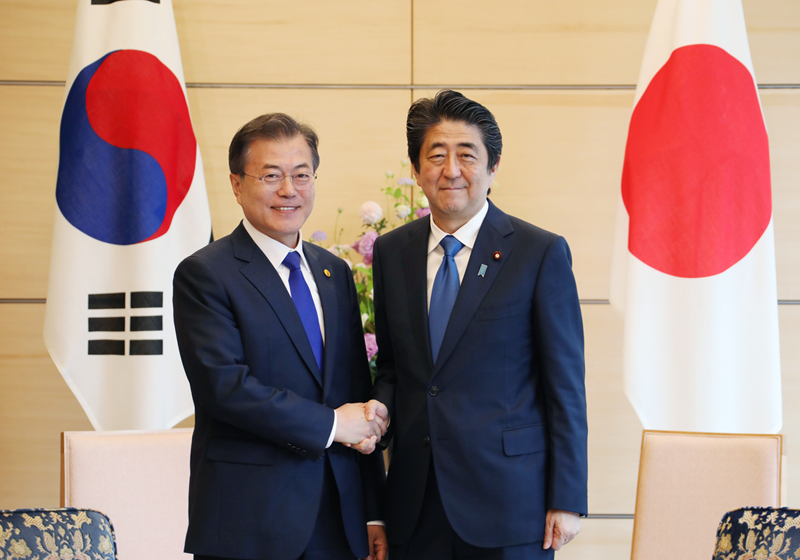
Abe meeting with South Korean president Moon Jae-in in 2018

=== Response to the mass media ===
The Asahi Shimbun accused Abe and Shōichi Nakagawa of censoring a 2001 NHK program concerning "The Women's International War Crimes Tribunal". The "tribunal" was a private committee which was established to adjudicate the complaints of comfort women; about 5,000 people, including 64 victims from Japan and abroad, attended. The members of the committee, who claimed to be specialists in international law, claimed that Emperor Hirohito and the Japanese government were responsible for the use of comfort women. However, the TV program did not mention the full name of the tribunal, it omitted keywords such as "Japanese troops" and "sexual slavery", and it also cut the sight of the tribunal, the host grouping, the statements of the organizer, and the judgment itself. Instead, it presented criticism of the tribunal by a right-wing academic who stated that "there was no abduction of sex slaves and they were prostitutes".

On the day following the broadcasting of the report by Asahi Shimbun, Akira Nagai, the chief producer and the primary person who was responsible for the program, held a press conference in which he stated that Abe stated that the content of the report by the Asahi Shimbun. "had to be broadcast from a neutral point of view" and "what I did is not giving into political pressure". Abe said, "It was political terrorism by Asahi Shimbun and it was tremendously clear that they had the intention to inhume me and Mr. Nakagawa politically, and it is also clear that it was a complete fabrication." He also characterized the tribunal as a "mock trial" and raised objection to the presence of North Korean prosecutors, singling them out as agents of the North Korean government. Abe's actions in the NHK incident were criticized by journalists as violating both the Broadcasting Act and the constitution.

On 24 October 2006, a report which stated that Abe's new administration had called on the NHK to "pay attention" to the North Korean abductees issue emerged. Critics, some even within Abe's own LDP party, charged that the government was violating freedom of expression by meddling in the affairs of the public broadcaster. In December 2006, it was revealed that former prime minister Junichiro Koizumi's government, in which Abe was Chief Cabinet Secretary, had influenced town hall-style meetings, during which paid performers would ask government officials favorable questions.

On 22 November 2012, it was reported that TBS's early morning TV show Asazuba accidentally displayed Abe's photo alongside a news report about an NHK announcer's arrest for a sex offense. Abe's face filled viewers' screens along with the name of NHK announcer Takeshige Morimoto, who anchors NHK's Ohayo Nippon program on Saturday and Sunday. Morimoto was arrested for allegedly groping a woman on the train. Abe posted on his public Facebook page, "This morning on the TBS show Asazuba, when a newscaster reported on a story regarding the apprehension of a molester, a photo of me was shown. Images of this blunder can now be seen clearly across the Internet, Have the slander campaigns already begun!? If this were merely an accident, it would be proper for the TV station to give me a personal apology, but as yet I haven't heard a single word." The newscaster acknowledged that the incorrect image had been displayed, but merely stated that the photo was "unrelated" and did not refer to the politician by name. Neither Abe nor his office received any form of apology.

Abe's constant interference and intimidation of media outlets was cited as one of many reasons Japan fell to 72nd place on the Press Freedom Index in 2016, in contrast to its previous 11th-place ranking from six years prior.

=== Yasukuni Shrine ===
Abe visited the Yasukuni Shrine on several occasions, which enshrines the spirits of Japan's war dead, including several Class-A war criminals convicted in the International Military Tribunal for the Far East. While serving as Chief Cabinet Secretary in the government of Junichiro Koizumi, he visited in April 2006, prompting South Korea to describe the trip as "regrettable". He visited again on 15 August 2012, the anniversary of the end of World War II. After winning the presidency of the Liberal Democratic Party, he visited on 17 October 2012, in an official capacity as party president.

Abe initially refrained from visiting the shrine as a sitting prime minister. He did not visit at all during his first term from September 2006 to September 2007, unlike his predecessor Koizumi, who had visited yearly while in office. Abe's not visiting the shrine prompted a Japanese nationalist named Yoshihiro Tanjo to cut off his little finger in protest and mail it to the LDP. While campaigning for the presidency of the LDP in 2012, Abe said that he regretted not visiting the shrine while he was prime minister. He again refrained from visiting the shrine during the first year of his second stint as prime minister in consideration of improving relations with China and Korea, whose leaders refused to meet with Abe during this time. He said on 9 December 2013 that "it is natural that we should express our feelings of respect to the war dead who sacrificed their lives for the nation... but it is my thinking that we should avoid making [Yasukuni visits] political and diplomatic issues". In lieu of visiting, Abe sent ritual offerings to the shrine for festivals in April and October 2013, as well as the anniversary of the end of World War II in August 2013.

His first visit to the shrine as prime minister took place on 26 December 2013, the first anniversary of his second term in office. It was the first visit to the shrine by a sitting prime minister since Junichiro Koizumi visited in August 2006. Abe said that he "prayed to pay respect for the war dead who sacrificed their precious lives and hoped that they rest in peace". The Chinese government published a protest that day, calling government visits to the shrine "an effort to glorify the Japanese militaristic history of external invasion and colonial rule and to challenge the outcome of World War II". Qin Gang of the Chinese Ministry of Foreign Affairs said Abe is "unwelcome by Chinese people... Chinese leaders won't meet him any more". The Mainichi Shimbun argued in an editorial that the visit could also "cast a dark shadow" on relations with the United States. The US embassy in Tokyo released a statement saying that "the United States is disappointed that Japan's leadership has taken an action that will exacerbate tensions with Japan's neighbors". The Wall Street Journal reported that US officials urged Abe not to visit the shrine and pay homage to war criminals anymore. On 15 August 2014, the 69th anniversary of the surrender of Japan in World War II, Abe chose to not visit the shrine, in what was perceived as a diplomatic gesture to China, South Korea, and Taiwan. Despite Abe's absence, China and South Korea both voiced their disapproval at Japan's leadership as a large number of politicians, including three cabinet members, did attend the shrine to mark the anniversary.

=== Photographs with "731" ===
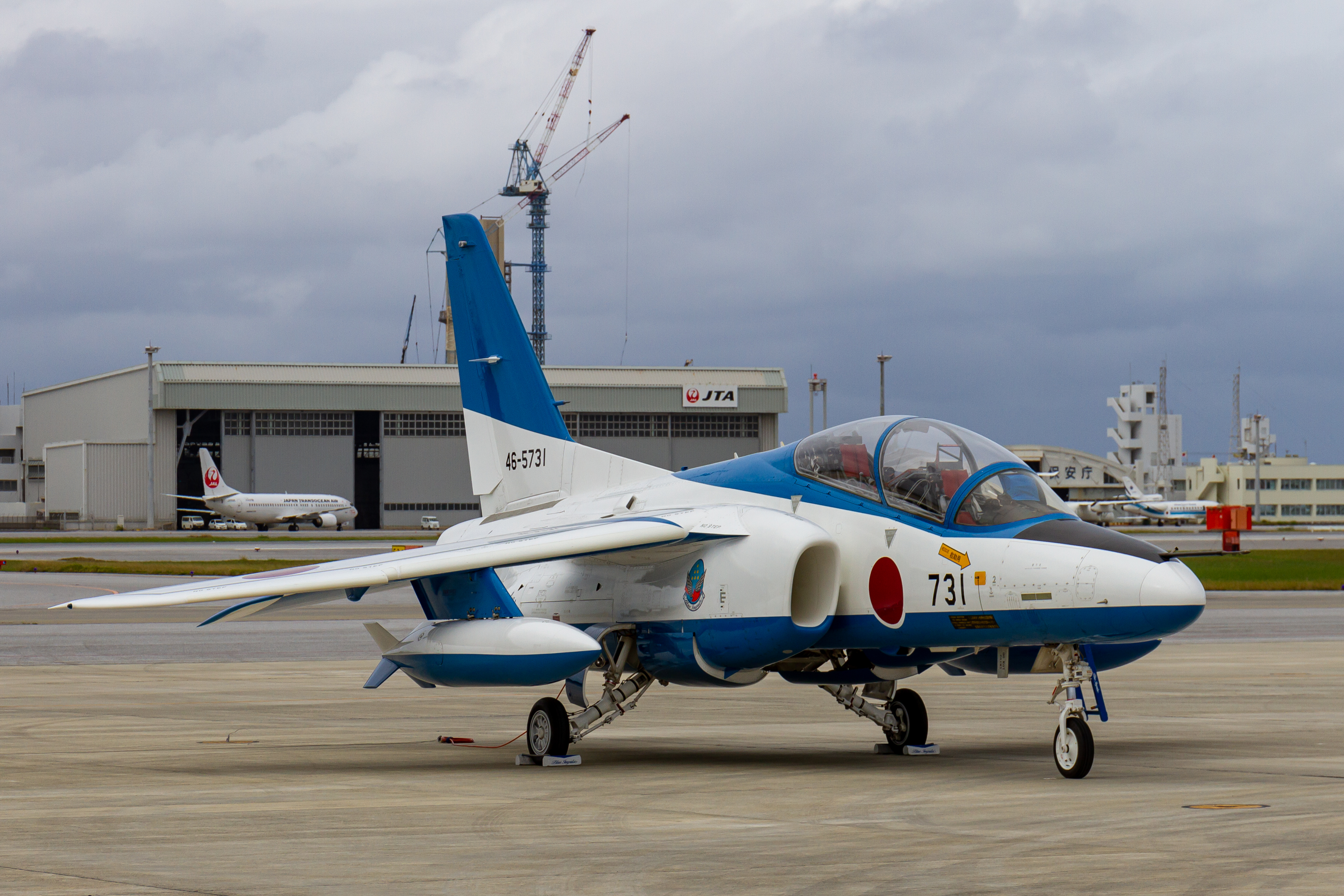
The Blue Impulse Kawasaki T-4 numbered 731 at Naha Airport in 2018

In May 2013, Abe posed for photographs giving thumbs up gestures while sitting in the cockpit of a Kawasaki T-4 military training aircraft of the Japan Air Self-Defense Force's Blue Impulse aerobatics team. The aircraft was numbered "731", which was the number of the infamous Imperial Japanese Army Unit 731 that conducted lethal chemical and biological experiments on live prisoners of war during World War II. The image was widely circulated in South Korean media and drew widespread criticism in both South Korea and China. The combination of the symbolically charged number and Abe's casual gesture was viewed as deeply insensitive and provocative. South Korean politician Chung Mong-joon described Abe's actions as "an act of direct provocation to Korea, China and other victim nations". In response, a Japanese Defense Ministry official claimed that the numbering on the jet was coincidental and that the numbers were the pilot's individual ID number.

=== Restoration of Sovereignty Day ===
On 28 April 2013, a new public event, the Restoration of Sovereignty Day (Japanese: 主権回復の日, romanized: Shuken kaifuku no hi), was held in Tokyo to mark the 61st anniversary of the end of the US occupation of Japan. It had been proposed by Abe in 2012. Since the US occupation of Okinawa ended in 1972 and nearly three-quarters of US troops in Japan continue to be stationed in Okinawa, the event, which was attended by Emperor Akihito, was denounced by many Okinawans, who saw it as celebrating a betrayal. There were demonstrations in both Okinawa and Tokyo.

=== Immigration policy ===
In 2015, the Abe government refused to admit refugees affected by conflicts in the Middle East and Africa. Abe said Japan must "solve its own problems before accepting immigrants." Abe backed a short-term work visa deal for migrant workers to "work for a limited period, earn more and return home."

== Personal life ==
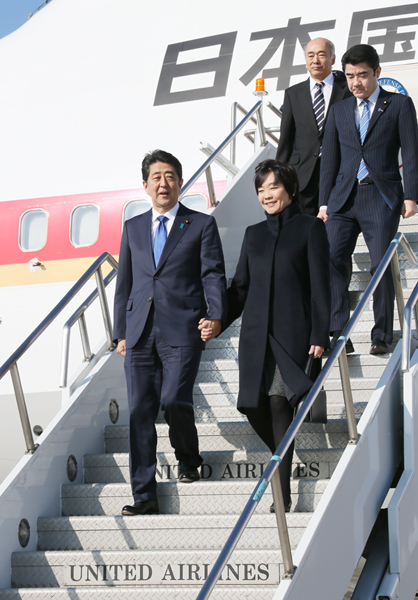
Abe and his wife Akie in 2016

Abe married Akie Matsuzaki, a socialite and former radio disc jockey, in 1987. She is the daughter of the president of Morinaga, a confectionery manufacturer. She is popularly known as the "domestic opposition party" due to her outspoken views, which often contradicted her husband's. Following her husband's first stint as prime minister, she opened an organic izakaya in the Kanda district of Tokyo, but remained inactive in management due to the urging of her mother-in-law. The couple were unable to have children, having undergone unsuccessful fertility treatments early in their marriage.

Abe's elder brother, Hironobu Abe, became president and CEO of Mitsubishi Shōji Packaging Corporation, while his younger brother, Nobuo Kishi, became Senior Vice Minister for Foreign Affairs. Abe abstained from drinking alcohol. In addition to his native Japanese, Abe spoke English.

== Legacy ==
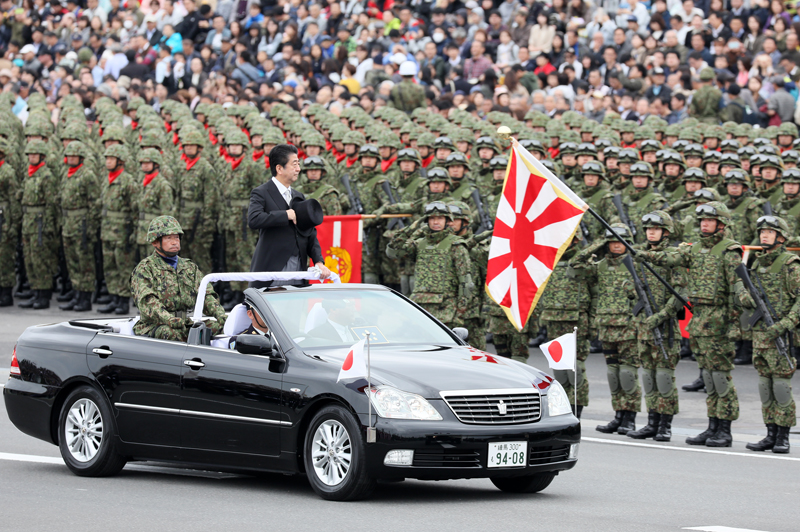
Abe's lifelong goal of revising the Constitution of Japan and its Article 9 clause was unrealized at the time of his death.

Abe was often referred to as the "shadow shogun" due to his profound influence on Japanese politics during his life. After his assassination, Japanologist Michael Green described Abe as "the most consequential modern Japanese leader" and argued that Japan's future appears to be that of Abe's "vision". Following Abe's assassination, the LDP–Komeito coalition won a majority of the available seats in the upper house in the 10 July election. This gave the government a majority in the upper house. Many, such as Sheila A. Smith of the Council on Foreign Relations and East Asia expert Jeff Kingston, speculated that a revised constitution, especially a revision of its Article 9 clause which outlaws war and the maintenance of military forces, may become Abe's main legacy. Abe is also credited with engineering the Trans-Pacific Partnership (TPP), and salvaging the deal as the Comprehensive and Progressive Agreement for Trans-Pacific Partnership (CPTPP), after the US withdrew from the TPP in 2017.

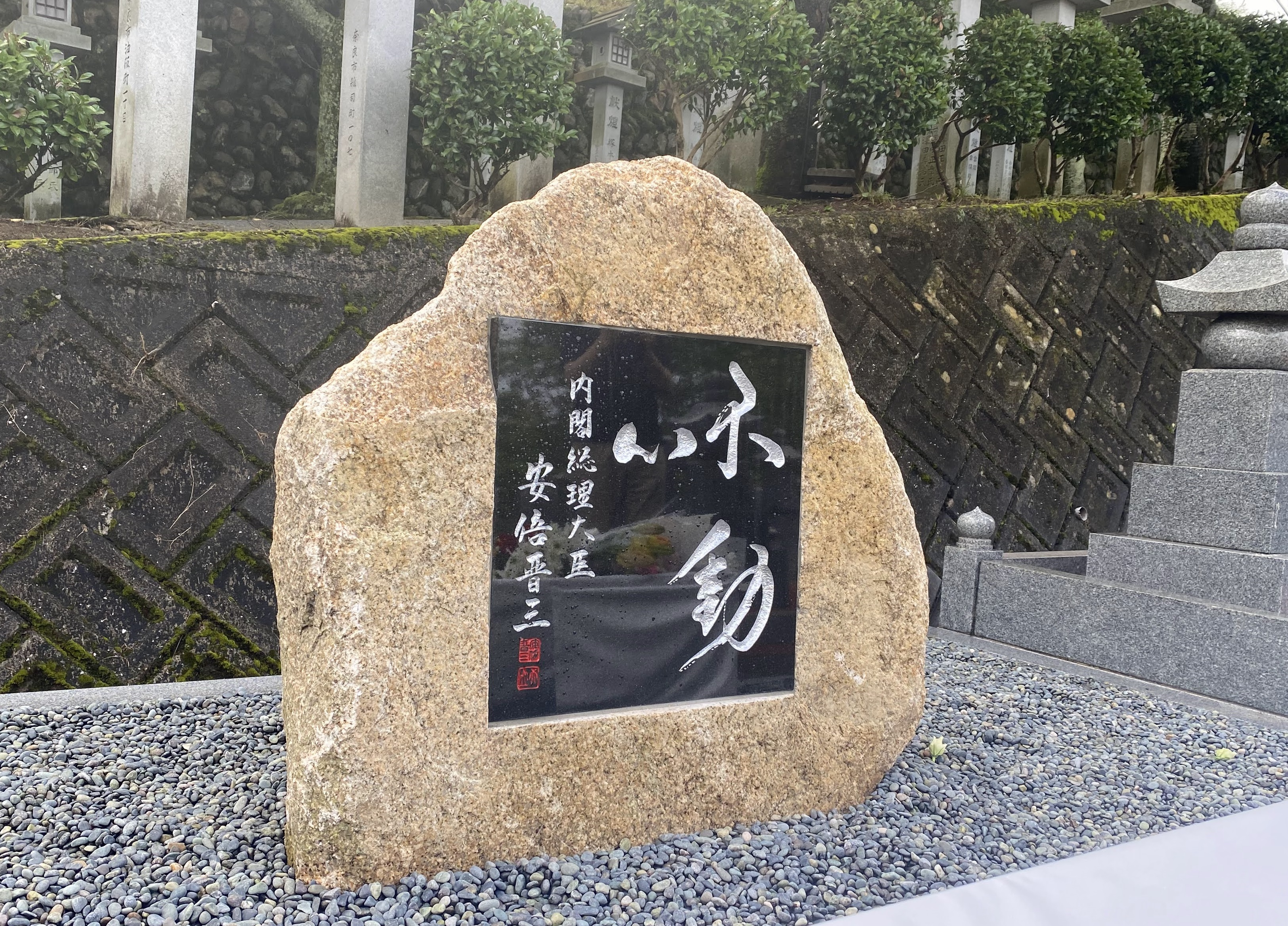
Memorial monument for Shinzo Abe in Nara Japan (2023)

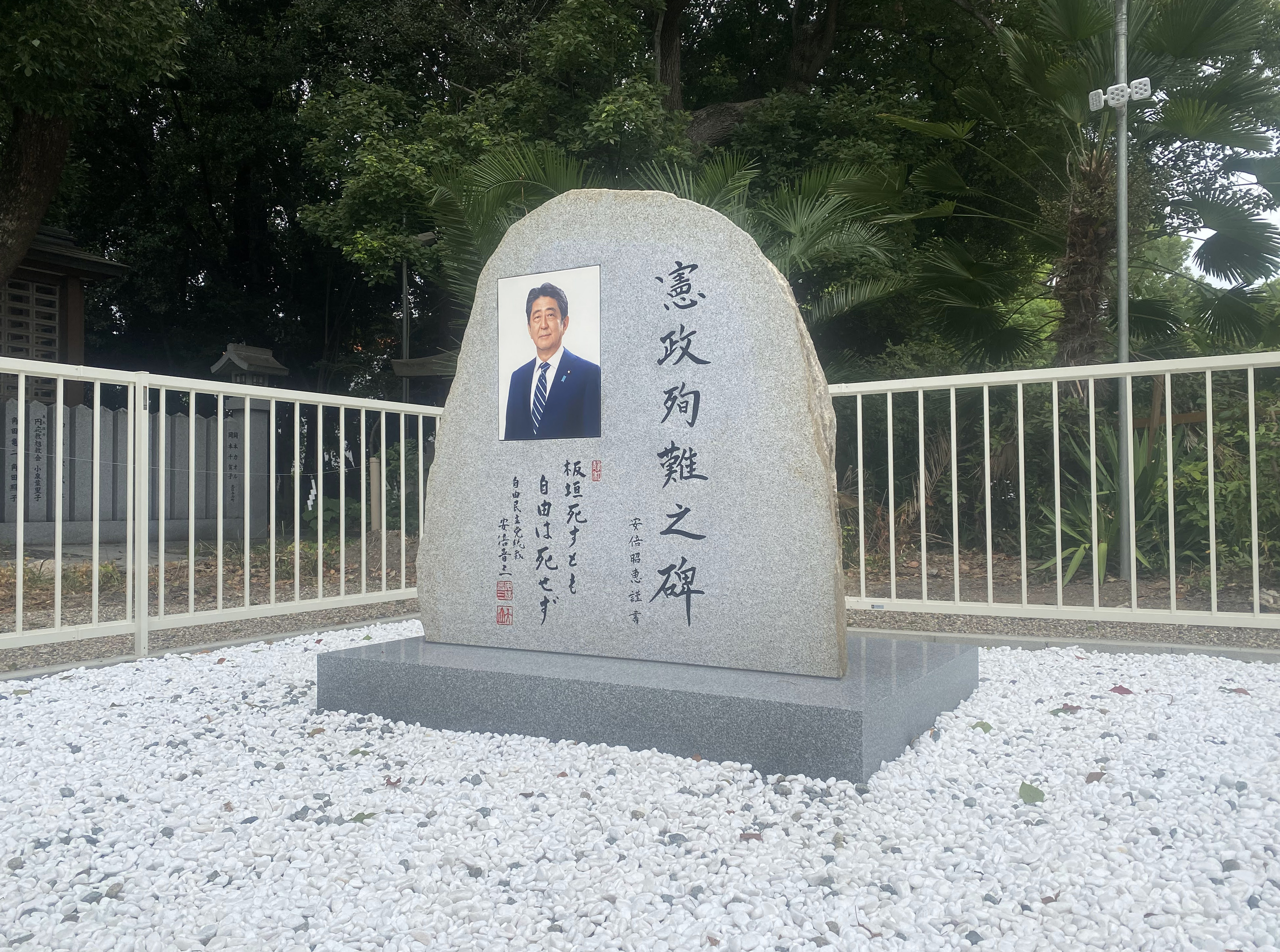
Memorial monument for Shinzo Abe at Osaka Gokoku Shrine in Osaka Japan (2025)

A Washington Post analysis described Abe as the "preeminent statesman of the Indo-Pacific" whose realist approach helped build a cooperative security network in East Asia. Columnist Josh Rogin wrote that Abe's lasting legacy was a world better prepared to confront an increasingly assertive China. Similarly, US Admiral James Stavridis wrote that Abe's greatest contribution was a strengthened Japanese military. His death solicited tributes and condolences from many states and leaders, a testament to his commitment to international relations. Consultant Bill Emmott noted that thanks to Abe's diplomacy, he was more popular abroad than domestically, bearing similarities to Margaret Thatcher. Economist Matthew P. Goodman of the Center for Strategic and International Studies (CSIS) wrote that Abe's legacy was that of a "Champion of the Global Economic Order", whose administration launched the "Partnership for Quality Infrastructure" infrastructure project in Asia, proposed an internationally endorsed organizing principle for global data governance, kickstarted the TPP, and later salvaged it with the CPTPP. Indian commentator Harshil Mehta called Abe a "Unifier of Oceans" in his obituary due to formation of the Quad and wrote that he "stayed committed to the common cause" of Japan and India. Conversely, Abe's nationalism and historical denialism strained long-term relations with the neighboring China and South Korea. Abe's complex legacy was displayed in both nations following his assassination, where some praised Abe's efforts to improve relations and others denounced his views on Japanese history with its neighbors. According to historian of religions Ernils Larsson, Abe's political rhetoric stoked "religious nationalism", and under his leadership the LDP forged closer ties with the "Shinto establishment". In addition, journalist Jake Adelstein argued that Abe left a legacy vexed by authoritarianism, with his actions throughout his tenure such as the intimidation of media that were critical of him leading to Japan's fall on the Press Freedom Index to as low as 72nd, stoking anti-Korean sentiments, as well as the creation of a "Cabinet Personnel Bureau" to vet bureaucratic positions of anyone that may be openly critical of the government, among others.

In Japan, Abe remains controversial and is described as the "most polarizing" figure in contemporary Japanese politics. Domestic divisiveness created by his historical negationist efforts is long-lasting. Abe also had a profound and lasting effect on the Japanese economy through Abenomics, leaving behind a mixed economic record.

The senate of the United States passed resolution 706 a bill to remember Abe.

An exhibition opens in Tokyo about Abe life and includes 100 personal items of the late prime minister and the microphone he was holding on when he was fatally shot.

== Honours ==
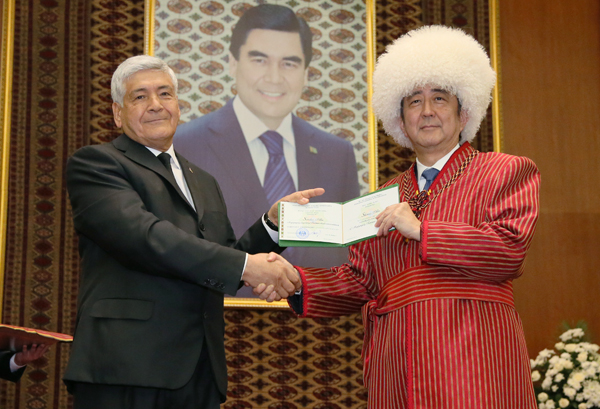
Abe with the rector of Turkmen State University in 2015

Abe received state honours, including the Supreme Order of the Chrysanthemum as well as posthumously being appointed Junior First Rank.

== Election history ==
Election	Age	District	Political party	Number of votes	election results
1993 Japanese general election	38	Yamaguchi 1st district	LDP	97,647	won
1996 Japanese general election	42	Yamaguchi 4th district	LDP	93,459	won
2000 Japanese general election	45	Yamaguchi 4th district	LDP	121,835	won
2003 Japanese general election	49	Yamaguchi 4th district	LDP	140,347	won
2005 Japanese general election	50	Yamaguchi 4th district	LDP	137,701	won
2009 Japanese general election	54	Yamaguchi 4th district	LDP	121,365	won
2012 Japanese general election	58	Yamaguchi 4th district	LDP	118,696	won
2014 Japanese general election	60	Yamaguchi 4th district	LDP	100,829	won
2017 Japanese general election	63	Yamaguchi 4th district	LDP	104,825	won
2021 Japanese general election	67	Yamaguchi 4th district	LDP	80,448	won

== See also ==
- First Abe Cabinet – 90th Cabinet of Japan (2006–2007)
- Second Abe Cabinet – 96th Cabinet of Japan (2012–2014)
- Third Abe Cabinet – 97th Cabinet of Japan (2014–2017)
- Fourth Abe Cabinet – 98th Cabinet of Japan (2017–2020)
- Tohokushinsha Film and Ministry of Internal Affairs and Communications scandal – 2012–2021 political scandal in Japan
- Work Style Reform Law – Japanese labour legislation
- Sanae Takaichi - successor

== Footnotes ==
House of Representatives (Japan)
Preceded by Shintaro Abe	Representative for Yamaguchi's 1st district 1993–1996	Constituency abolished
New constituency	Representative for Yamaguchi's 4th district 1996–2022	Succeeded by Shinji Yoshida
Political offices
Preceded by Fukushiro Nukaga	Deputy Chief Cabinet Secretary (Political affairs, House of Representatives); 2000–2003	Succeeded by Hiroyuki Hosoda
Preceded by Hiroyuki Hosoda	Chief Cabinet Secretary; 2005–2006	Succeeded by Yasuhisa Shiozaki
Preceded by Junichiro Koizumi	Prime Minister of Japan; 2006–2007	Succeeded by Yasuo Fukuda
Preceded by Yoshihiko Noda	Prime Minister of Japan; 2012–2020	Succeeded by Yoshihide Suga
Party political offices
Preceded by Keiji Furuya	Director of the Youth Division, Liberal Democratic Party; 1996–1997	Succeeded by Fumio Kishida
Preceded by Taku Yamasaki	Secretary-General of the Liberal Democratic Party; 2003–2004	Succeeded by Tsutomu Takebe
Preceded by Fumio Kyuma	Acting Secretary General, Liberal Democratic Party; 2004–2005	Succeeded by Ichiro Aisawa
Preceded by Junichiro Koizumi	President of the Liberal Democratic Party; 2006–2007	Succeeded by Yasuo Fukuda
Preceded by Sadakazu Tanigaki	President of the Liberal Democratic Party; 2012–2020	Succeeded by Yoshihide Suga
Preceded by Hiroyuki Hosoda	Head of the Seiwa Seisaku Kenkyūkai; 2021–2022	Vacant
Diplomatic posts
Preceded by Angela Merkel	Chair of the Group of Seven; 2016	Succeeded by Paolo Gentiloni
Preceded by Mauricio Macri	Chair of the Group of 20; 2019	Succeeded by Salman
