= Toshimitsu Funabashi =

- 船橋 利実
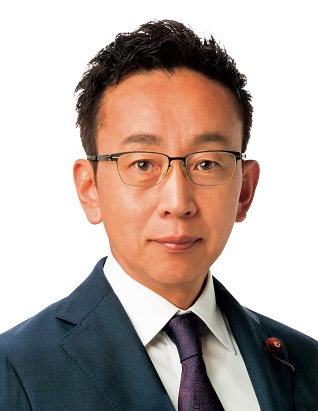
- Official portrait

Member of the Senate
- Incumbent
- Assumed office 26 July 2022
- Constituency: Hokkaido

Member of the House of Representatives
- In office 22 October 2017 – 14 October 2021
- Constituency: Hokkaido PR
- In office 16 December 2012 – 21 November 2014
- Preceded by: Takahiro Yokomichi
- Succeeded by: Takahiro Yokomichi
- Constituency: Hokkaido 1st district

Member of the Hokkaido Legislative Assembly
- In office 1995–2012
- Constituency: Kitami

Personal details
- Born: 20 November 1960 (age 65) Kitami, Hokkaido, Japan
- Party: Liberal Democratic
- Education: Hokkai Gakuen University (MS)

Toshimitsu Funabashi is a Japanese politician and businessman currently serving as a member of the Senate from Hokkaido, an office he has held since 2022. Prior to his election to the Senate, he served as a member of the House of Representatives for two periods from 2012 to 2014 and 2017 to 2021; and also as a member of the Hokkaido Legislative Assembly from 1995 to 2012.

In the Senate, Funabashi is the chair of the Senate Committee on Agriculture, Forestry and Fisheries. A member of the Liberal Democratic Party (LDP), he is the director of the Fisheries Division in the Policy Research Council of the Liberal Democratic Party.

Thoroughout his time in the National Diet, Funabashi has held two roles in the Cabinet of Japan, serving as the Vice-Minister for Internal Affairs and Communications during the second reshuffle of the Second Kishida cabinet and Vice-Minister of Finance during the Suga cabinet.

== Early Life and Education ==
Toshimitsu Funabashi was born on 20 November 1960 in Kitami, Hokkaido. During his childhood, he attended Kitami Municipal Elementary school, Kitami Municipal Junior High School, and graduated from Kitami Hakuyou High School in 1979. After high school, he attended Hokkai Gakuen University, a private university in Sapporo, and studied civil engineering before graduating in 1983.

During his political career, Funabashi would re-enroll in Hokkai Gakuen university in order to attend the Graduate School of Commerce. He completed a masters program in 2015.

== Career ==
=== Private Sector and Local Politics ===
Following his graduation, Funabashi began working for the construction company Hokuto Kensetsu. Rising the ranks of the company, he eventually became its president; a positition he held until 2014.

In 1991, Funabashi was elected to the city council of Kitami, serving for a singular term. At the end of this term in 1995, he successfully ran for Kitami's seat in the Hokkaido Legislative Assembly, where he would serve for five terms until 2012.

=== House of Representatives ===
Ahead of the 2012 Japanese general election, he was selected by the Liberal Democratic Party (LDP) to be the parties' candidate in Hokkaido 1st district in the House of Representatives. In this race, he successfully ran against incumbent Democratic Party of Japan (DPJ) representative Takahiro Yokomichi, who was at that point Speaker of the House. Yokomichi would lose his seat, but remain in the House of Representatives via the proportional representation system. After winning this race, Funabashi would become the first member of the LDP to represent Hokkaido's first district.

During the 2014 Japanese general election, Funabashi would seek reelection to the House of Representatives from Hokkaido's 1st district. He was defeated in the election by his previous opponent Takahiro Yokomichi, returning the seat to the DPJ. He garnered 105,918 votes, the most for an unelected candidate across the entire election. Despite the LDP winning three seats in the Hokkaido proportional representation block, Funabashi did not secure a seat via proportional representation; being the only unsuccessful first-past-the-post candidate in Hokkaido to not be elected proportionally.

Funabashi would run again in the 2017 Japanese general election, again in Hokkaido's first district. He lost the election to Daiki Michishita of the Constitutional Democratic Party. However, he would win a seat in the House of Representatives as part of Hokkaido's proportional representation block and return to national politics. Funabashi failed to be reelected in the 2021 Japanese general election, despite the LDP gaining a seat from the proportional representation district.

=== Senate ===
Funabashi would run in the 2022 Japanese Senate Election for the Hokkaido at-large district as an LDP candidate, winning one of three seats alongside fellow LDP member Gaku Hasegawa and CDP candidate Eri Tokunaga.

Later in October 2022, then-Prime Minister Fumio Kishida was embroiled in a nepotism controversy regarding the appointment of his son Shōtarō Kishida as a policy secretary. During the affair, it was brought to public attention that Funabashi had also similarly appointed his eldest son as a staffer to his role in the National Diet. Funabashi would address this controversy by stating that he had hired his son based on his son's interest in politics, rather than familial ties.

In August 2024, Manabu Horii, a member of the House of Representatives representing the Hokkaido proportional representation block, resigned from his seat due to a violation of fiscal electoral law. As a result, the Central Election Management Council selected Toshimitsu Funabashi to fill the vacancy; being that he was runner up for Horii's seat during the previous election. However, Funabashi declined to take the seat, citing a wish to remain a member of the Senate. Having failed to resign from the Senate, Funabashi officially forfeited the seat. As a result, the seat then passed on to former member of the House of Representatives and current member of the Hokkaido Legislative Assembly Kazuo Maeda; who also declined the seat. Ultimately, the seat was given to Yūsuke Takahashi, who had previously run in Hokkaido's 2nd district during the last election.

In September 2024, a leadership election for the Liberal Democratic Party was held. There were nine candidates in the running. A member of the Shikōkai faction, Funabashi endorsed fellow faction member and Minister for Digital Transformation Taro Kono. After Kono was eliminated in the first round, Funabashi alongside senior members of Shikōkai met in a hotel in Tokyo and decided to support ultraconservative Nara 2nd district representative Sanae Takaichi in the second round. The leader of the Shikōkai, Taro Aso also would later publicly endorse Takaichi. Later that day The Sankei Shimbun would report that Aso had privately instructed members of the Shikōkai faction to vote for Takaichi in the first round. Though Funabashi supported Kono in the first round, he did not publicly disclose who he voted for in the second round.

On 24 October, 2025; Funabashi became chair of the Fisheries Division of the Policy Research Council of the Liberal Democratic Party. Later on in 2026, Funabashi became chair of the Senate Committee on Agriculture, Forestry, and Fisheries.

== Political Positions ==
=== Constitutional Amendments ===
Across three different surveys with the Asahi Shimbun in 2012, 2014, and 2017; Funabashi stated being in favor of amending the japanese constitution. Funabashi particularly supports amending article 9 (which limits the Japanese military) of the Constitution of Japan.

Funabashi also noted emergency situation clauses, environmental rights, and the process of amending the constitution as areas requiring constitutional amendment.

=== Military and Foreign Relations ===
Funabashi is supportive of the current Japanese Self-Defence Force and supportive of further military activities. When asked if he would support a preemptive strike on an enemy of Japan, he was undecided.

Funabashi believes that applying pressure is more important than dialogue during interactions between Japan and North Korea.

Funabashi opposes the construction United States Military bases in Hokkaido; which has been proposed to reduce the burden on Okinawa; where 70% of such bases are located.

Funabashi is a supporter of the three Non-Nuclear Principles.

Funabashi is neutral on the idea of expanding the permanent members of the United Nations Security Council to include Japan.

=== Social Policy ===
Funabashi is a supporter of the State Secrecy Law, and believes it is necessary for the security of Japan. However; he does not support restriction of privacy rights or other individual liberties in order to preserve the security of Japan. He is also opposed to organized crime and supports laws to suppress it.

Regarding a scandal involving Moritomo Gakuen; a Japanese schoolteacher involved in fraud and anti-korean education; he supported the Third Abe Cabinet's handling of the matter.

A Japanese nationalist, Funabashi believes that the Prime Minister of Japan should visit the controversial Yasukuni Shrine. He also is in favor of reassessing the accuracy of the Kono Statement. He is opposed to laws regarding hate speech towards non-Japanese ethnicities. He is also tepidly opposed to granting local suffrage to foreigners in Japan.

Funabashi is in favor of legalized gambling.

== Personal life ==
In an August 2022 interview with Hokkaido Shimbun regarding Funabashi's ties to the Unification Church, he reported having purchased party tickets, received election assistance, sent congratulatory telegrams to events, and paid membership fees to affiliated organizations.
