= Constitutional reform in Japan =

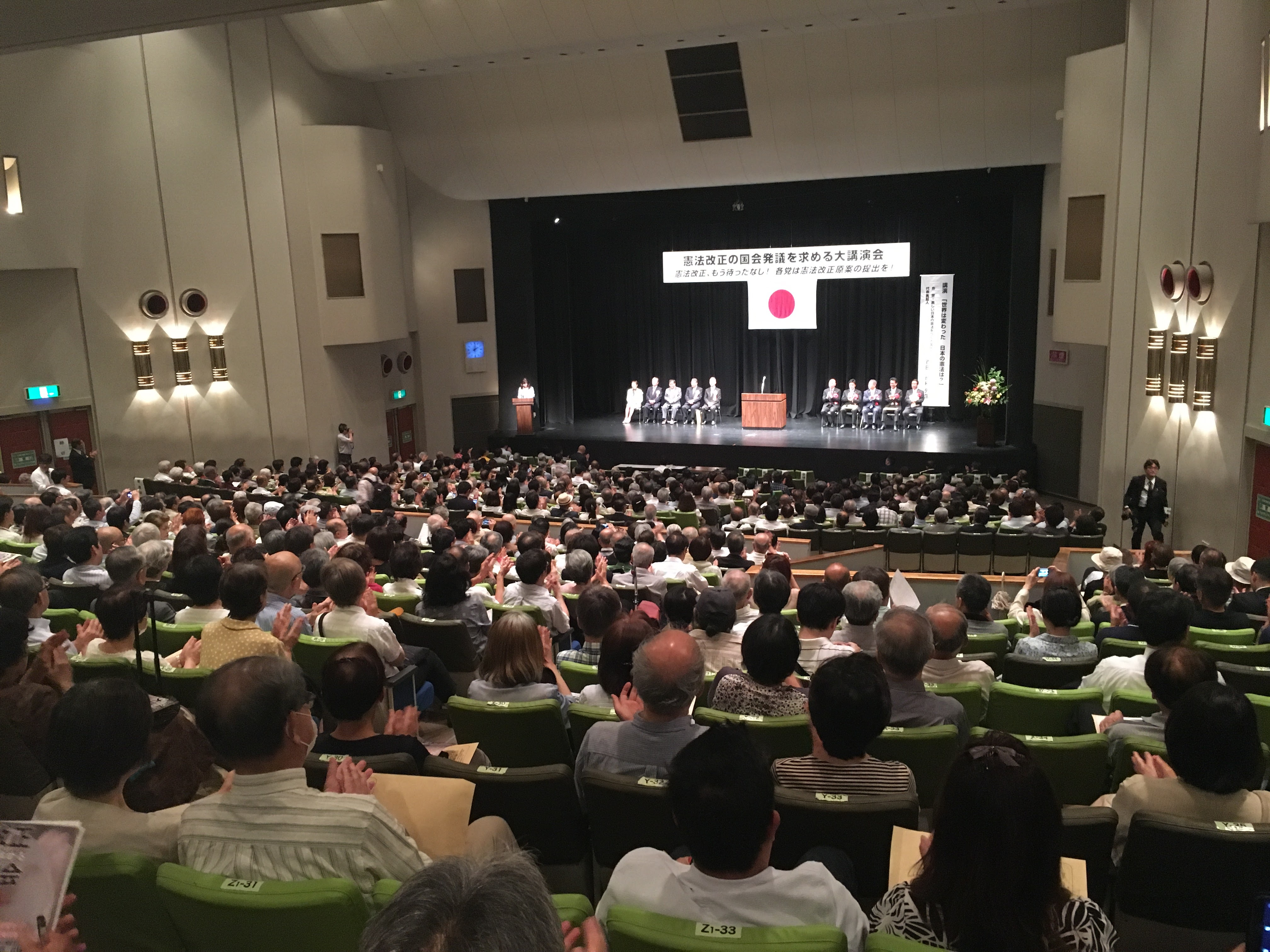
Lecture for constitutional reform in Japan (2017)

Constitutional reform in Japan, colloquially known as Kaiken-ron (改憲論), is an ongoing political effort to reform the Constitution of Japan.

The effort recently gained traction in the 2010s as the Japanese government under then-prime minister Shinzo Abe attempted to revise Article 9 of the Constitution, which prohibits Japan from waging war as means to settle international disputes, as well as prohibiting Japan from having an armed forces with war potential. Although Abe's attempt was unsuccessful due to his leaving office in 2020 and his subsequent assassination, succeeding prime minister Fumio Kishida said that he was "determined" to work on constitutional reform, citing the ongoing Russian invasion of Ukraine, recent tensions in Taiwan, and North Korea's development of weapons of mass destruction as his basis.

== Overview ==
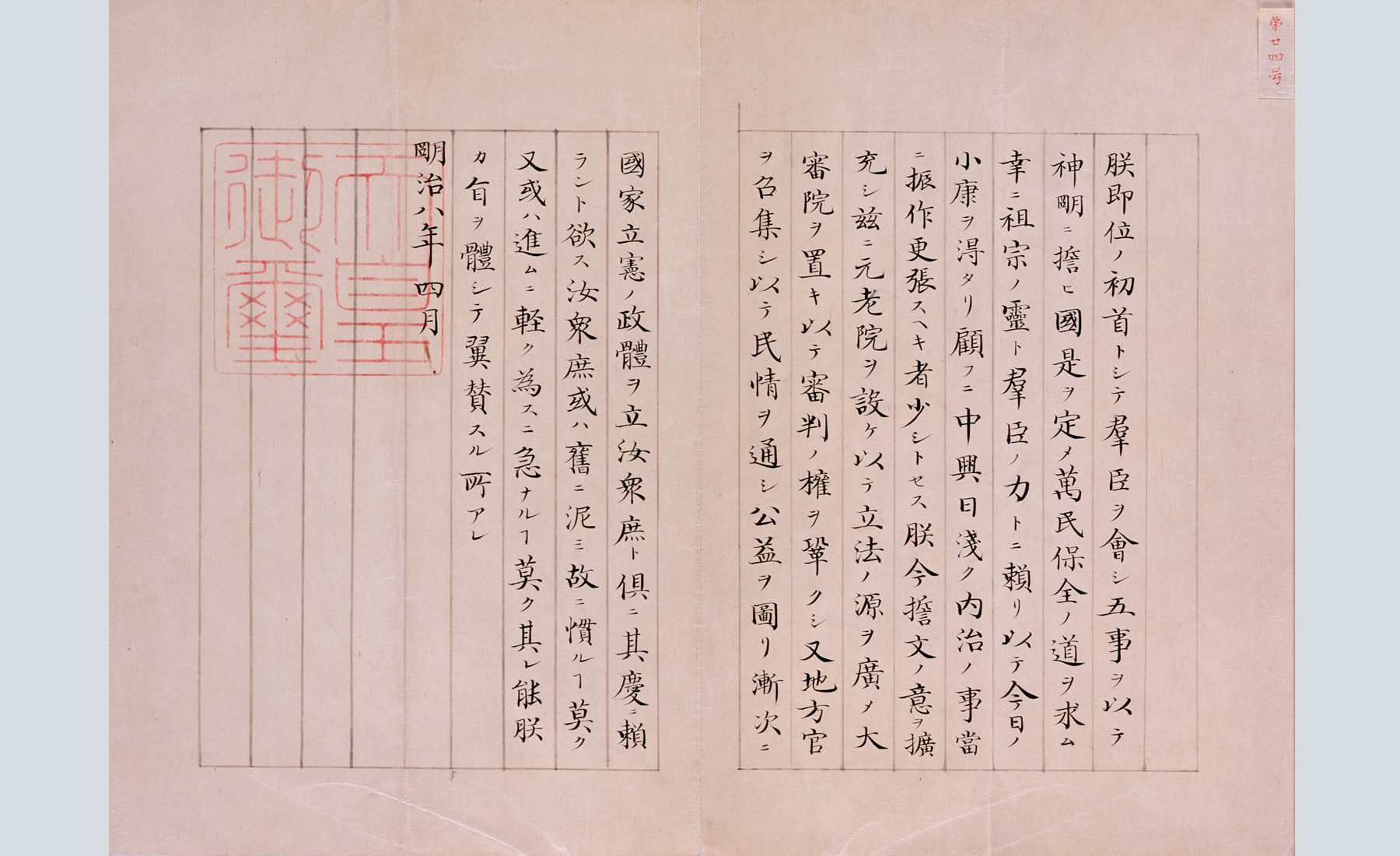
Japanese Imperial Rescript Establishing a Constitutional Form of Government by Emperor Meiji on 14 April 1875

Article 96 provides that amendments can be made to the Constitution if approved by super majority of two-thirds of both houses of the National Diet (the House of Representatives and the House of Councillors), and then by a simple majority in a popular referendum. The Emperor promulgates the successful amendment in the name of the people, and cannot veto it. Details of the process is determined by the Diet Act and the Act on Procedures for Amendment of the Constitution of Japan.

Unlike some constitutions (e.g. the American, German, Italian, and French Constitutions), Japan's Constitution does not have an explicit entrenchment provision limiting what can be amended. However, the Preamble of the Constitution declared democracy to be the "universal principle of mankind" and Article 97 proclaims the fundamental rights guaranteed by the Constitution to be "for all time inviolable." Because of this, scholars generally believe that basic principles such as the sovereignty of the people, pacifism, and respect for human rights are unamendable. More broadly, fundamental norms written in the Constitution by constituent power cannot be amended. The preamble of the Constitution states: "We reject and revoke all constitutions, laws, ordinances, and rescripts in conflict herewith". Pacifism, popular sovereignty and respect for basic human rights are among them according to the Preamble and Article 11.

== History ==
The Constitution has not been amended since its enactment in 1946. Some commentators have suggested that the Constitution's American authors favoured the difficulty of the amendment process from a desire that the fundamentals of the regime they had imposed would be resistant to change. The possibility of change to the document and to the post-war settlement it embodies has been highly controversial. From the 1960s to the 1980s, Constitutional revision was rarely debated, although amendment of the Constitution has been one of the party line of the LDP since it was formed. In the 1990s, right-leaning and conservative voices broke some taboos, for example, when the newspaper Yomiuri Shimbun published a suggestion for Constitutional revision in 1994. This period saw a number of right-leaning groups pushing aggressively for Constitutional revision and a significant number of organizations and individuals speaking out against revision and in support of "the peace Constitution".

The debate has been highly polarised. The most controversial issues are proposed changes to Article 9—the "peace article"—and provisions relating to the role of the Emperor. Progressive, left, centre-left and peace movement-related individuals and organizations, as well as the opposition parties, labor and youth groups advocate keeping or strengthening the existing Constitution in these areas, while right-leaning, nationalist and conservative groups and individuals advocate changes to increase the prestige of the Emperor (though not granting him political powers) and to allow a more aggressive stance of the Japanese Self-Defense Forces (JSDF) by turning it officially into a military. Other areas of the Constitution and connected laws discussed for potential revision related to the status of women, the education system and the system of public corporations (including social welfare, non-profit and religious organizations as well as foundations), and structural reform of the election process, e.g. to allow for direct election of the prime minister. Numerous grassroots groups, associations, NGOs, think tanks, scholars, and politicians speak out on either side of the issue.

== Amendment Drafts by the LDP ==
The Liberal Democratic Party (LDP), one of the most influential political parties in Japan, which has been in majority in the Diet for most of the time since its 1955 establishment, has adopted several party platforms, each of which lists "revision of the current constitution" as a political motive. One of the earliest platforms, "The Duties of the Party" in 1955, points out as follows:

Although democracy and liberalism emphasized under the control of the Allied occupation should be respected and upheld as a new principle for Japan, the initial objective of the occupying forces of the Allies was mainly to demoralize the State; therefore, many of the reforms implemented by the forces including those of the constitution, education and other governmental systems have been unjustly suppressing the notion of the State and patriotism of the people and excessively disuniting the national sovereignty.

In recent years, the LDP has committed itself more to constitutional revision, following its victory in the September 2005 general election of the representatives. Currently, the party has released two versions of amendment drafts, one in 2005 and another in 2012.

=== 2005 Draft ===
In August 2005, the then Japanese Prime Minister, Junichirō Koizumi, proposed an amendment to the constitution to increase Japan's Defence Forces' roles in international affairs. A draft of the proposed constitution was released by the LDP on 22 November 2005, as part of the fiftieth anniversary of the party's founding. The proposed changes included:

- New wording for the Preamble.
- First paragraph of Article 9, renouncing war, is retained. The second paragraph, forbidding the maintenance of "land, sea, and air forces, as well as another war potential" is replaced by an Article 9-2 which permits a "defense force", under the control of the Prime Minister, to defend the nation, and which may participate in international activities. This new section uses the term "軍" (gun, "army" or "military"), which has been avoided in the current constitution. It also adds Article 76 about military courts; members of the JSDF are currently tried as civilians by civilian courts.
- Modified wording in Article 13, regarding respect for individual rights.
- Changes in Article 20, which gives the state limited permission within "the scope of socially acceptable protocol" for "ethnocultural practices". Changes Article 89 to permit corresponding state funding of religious institutions.
- Changes to Articles 92 and 95, concerning local self-government and relations between local and national governments.
- Changes to Article 96, reducing the vote requirement for constitutional amendments in the Diet from two-thirds to a simple majority. A national referendum would still be required.

This draft prompted debate, with strong opposition coming even from non-governmental organizations of other countries, as well as established and newly formed grassroots Japanese organizations, such as Save Article 9. Per the current constitution, a proposal for constitutional changes must be passed by a two-thirds vote in the Diet, then be put to a national referendum. However, in 2005, there was no legislation in place for such a referendum.

Koizumi's successor, Shinzo Abe, vowed to push aggressively for Constitutional revision. A major step toward this was getting legislation passed to allow for a national referendum in April 2007. By that time, there was little public support for changing the Constitution, with a survey showing 34.5% of Japanese not wanting any changes, 44.5% wanting no changes to Article 9, and 54.6% supporting the current interpretation on self-defense. On the 60th anniversary of the Constitution, on 3 May 2007, thousands took to the streets in support of Article 9. The Chief Cabinet secretary and other top government officials interpreted the survey to mean that the public wanted a pacifist Constitution that renounces war, and may need to be better informed about the details of the revision debate. The legislation passed by parliament specifies that a referendum on Constitutional reform could take place at the earliest in 2010, and would need approval from a majority of voters.

=== 2012 Draft ===
On April 27, 2012, the LDP drafted a new version of the amendment, with an explanatory booklet for general readers. The booklet states that the spirit of the amendment is to "make the Constitution more suitable for Japan" by "drastically revising the translationese wording and the provisions based on the theory of natural human rights currently adopted in the Constitution". The proposed changes includes:

- Preamble: In the LDP draft, the Preamble declares that Japan is reigned by the Emperor and adopts the popular sovereignty and trias politica principles. The current Preamble refers to the government as a trust of the people (implying the "natural rights codified into the constitution by the social contract" model) and ensures people "the right to live in peace, free from fear and want", but both mentions are deleted in the LDP draft.
- Emperor: Overall, the LDP draft adopts a wording that sounds as though the Emperor has greater power than under the current Constitution. The draft defines him as "the head of the State" (Article 1). Compared to the current Constitution, he is exempted from "the obligation to respect and uphold this Constitution" (Article 102). The draft defines Nisshōki as the national flag and Kimigayo the national anthem (Article 3).
- Human rights: The LDP draft, as the accompanying booklet states, revises many of the human rights provisions currently adopted in the Constitution. The booklet describes the reason for these changes as: "Human rights should have ground on the State's history, culture and tradition" and "Several of the current Constitutional provisions are based on the Western-European theory of natural human rights; such provisions, therefore, require to be changed." The draft lists every instance of the basic rights as something that is entitled by the State – as opposed to something that human beings inherently possess – as seen in the draft provisions of "new human rights" (see below).

The current Constitution has the phrase "public welfare" in four articles (Articles 12, 13, 22 and 29) and states that any human right is subject to restriction when it "interferes with the public welfare". The majority of legal professionals argue that the spirit of such restriction against rights based on "public welfare" is to protect other people's rights from infringement. In the LDP draft, every instance of the phrase "public welfare" is replaced with a new phrase: "public interest and public order". The booklet describes the reason for this change as "to enable the State to restrict human rights for the sake of purposes other than protecting people's rights from infringement", but it remains unclear under what conditions the State can restrict human rights. It also explains that what "public order" means, is "order of society", and its intention is not to prohibit the people from making an objection to the government, but it explains nothing about "public interest".

Provisions regarding the people's rights modified or added in the LDP draft include:

- [Individualism]: The LDP draft replaces the word "individuals" with "persons" (Article 13). This change reflects the draft authors' view on "excessive individualism" being an ethically unacceptable thought.
- Human rights and the supremacy of the constitution: The current constitution has Article 97 at the beginning of the "Supreme Law" chapter, which stipulates that the constitution guarantees basic human rights to the people. The current, prevalent interpretation of Article 97 is that this article describes the essential reason why this constitution is the supreme law, which is the fact that the constitution's spirit is to guarantee human rights. In the LDP draft, this article is deleted and the booklet does not explain any reason for the deletion.
- Freedom of assembly, association, speech and all other forms of expression: The LDP draft adds a new paragraph on Article 21, which enables the State to prohibit the people from performing expressions "for the purpose of interfering with public interest and public order". The LDP explains that this change makes it easy for the State to take countermeasures against criminal organizations like Aum Shinrikyo.
- Right to property: The LDP draft adds a new paragraph stating that the State shall define intellectual property rights "for the sake of promotion of the people's intellectual creativity" (Article 29).
- Workers' rights: Workers have the right to participate in a labor union, but currently there is a dispute on whether public officials should be entitled to this right. The LDP draft adds a new paragraph to make it clear that public officials shall not enjoy this right or part thereof (Article 28).
- Freedom from torture and cruel punishments: Under the current constitution, torture and cruel punishments are "absolutely forbidden", but the LDP draft deletes the word "absolutely" (Article 36). The reason for this change is not presented in the booklet.
- "New human rights": The LDP draft adds four provisions regarding the concept collectively called "new human rights": protection of privacy (Article 19–2), accountability of the State (Article 21–2), environmental protection (Article 25–2), and rights of crime victims (Article 25–4). However, the draft only requires the State to make a good faith effort to meet the stated goals and does not entitle the people to these "rights", as the booklet points out.
- Obligations of the people: The LDP draft can be characterized by its obligation clauses imposed on the people. The current constitution lists three obligations: to work (Article 27), to pay taxes as provided for by law (Article 30), and to have all boys and girls under their protection receive ordinary education as provided for by law (Article 26). The LDP draft adds six more:
  - The people must respect the national anthem and flag (Article 3).
  - The people must be conscious of the fact that there are responsibilities and obligations in compensation for freedom and rights (Article 12).
  - The people must comply with the public interest and public order (Article 12).
  - The people must help one another among the members of a household (Article 24).
  - The people must obey commands from the State or the subordinate offices thereof in a state of emergency (Article 99).
  - The people must uphold the constitution (Article 102).

Additionally, although defence of the national territory (Article 9–3) and environmental protection (Article 25–2) are literally listed under the LDP draft as obligations of the State, these provisions let the State call for the "cooperation with the people" to meet the goals provided, effectively functioning as obligation clauses on the people's side.

- Equality: The current constitution guarantees equality to citizens, prohibiting any discrimination based on "race, creed, sex, social status or family origin". The LDP draft adds "handicaps" (Articles 14 and 44) between "sex" and "social status", improving the equality under the law. On the other hand, the sentence "No privilege shall accompany any award of honor, decoration or any distinction" in the current paragraph (2) of Article 14 is deleted in the LDP draft, which means that the State shall be allowed to grant "privilege" as part of national awards. The reason for this change is not presented in the booklet.
- National security: The LDP draft deletes the current provision declaring that armed forces and another war potential shall never be maintained, and adds new Articles 9-2 and 9-3 stating that the "National Defense Force" shall be set up and the Prime Minister shall be its commander-in-chief. According to the paragraph (3) of the new Article 9–2, the National Defense Force not only can defend the territory from a foreign attack and can participate in international peacekeeping operations, but also can operate to either maintain domestic public order or to protect individual rights.
- State of emergency: The LDP draft grants the Prime Minister the authority to declare a "state of emergency" in a national emergency including foreign invasions, domestic rebellions, and natural disasters (Article 98). When in a state of emergency, the Cabinet can enact orders that have the effect of the laws passed by the [National Diet] (Article 99).
- Relaxation of separation of religion and the State: The LDP draft deletes the current clause that prohibits the State from granting "political authority" to a religious organization, and enables the State to perform religious acts itself within the scope of "social protocol or ethnocultural practices" (Article 20).
- Political control over the courts: Unlike the current constitution, which guarantees that the Supreme court judges shall not be dismissed unless the "review" procedure stipulated by the constitution, the LDP draft enables the Diet to define this review procedure through a Diet-enacted law, not the constitution (Article 79). The draft also states that the salary of a judge – of both the Supreme Court and inferior courts – could be decreased in the same manner as any other kind of public official(s) (Articles 79 and 80) by the subordinate offices of the State (namely, the National Personnel Authority).
- Further amendments: The LDP draft states that a simple majority in the two Houses shall be adequate for a motion for a constitutional amendment (Article 96). An actual amendment shall still require a national referendum, but a simple majority in "the number of valid votes actually cast", as opposed to "the number of qualified voters" or "the number of votes", shall enact the amendment (Article 96).

=== Legislation for Peace and Security ===
In 2015, prime minister Shinzo Abe and the ruling LDP promoted and passed the Legislation for Peace and Security on 19 September 2015, despite some public opposition, to allow the JSDF to participate in foreign conflicts, overturning its previous policy of fighting only in self-defense. Since the constitution allows the Japanese military to act only in self-defense, the legislation reinterpreted the relevant passages to allow the military to operate overseas for "collective self-defense" for allies. The legislation came into effect on 29 March 2016.

== See also ==
- Proposed Japanese constitutional referendum
- SEALDs
