= Association of Scholars Opposed to the Security-related Laws =

Japanese organization

The Association of Scholars Opposed to the Security-related Laws (安全保障関連法に反対する学者の会), previously known as the Association of Scholars Opposed to the Security-related Bills (安全保障関連法案に反対する学者の会), is an organization of Japanese scholars opposed to the Legislation for Peace and Security, which was founded in June 2015.

== History ==
In 2015, the Shinzo Abe cabinet pushed for the Legislation for Peace and Security to allow Japanese military forces to intervene in foreign conflicts, despite popular opposition. As a reaction to that event, Professor Manabu Satō founded the organization in June 2015. The organization has been acting together with the Students Emergency Action for Liberal Democracy (SEALDs) during the summer of 2015, organizing protests against the constitutional changes.

As of September 2015, 14,232 scholars across Japan have signed up to join the organization, with more than 32,000 supporters and 100 university groups associated. On September 6, the association and SEALDs together organized a mass rally in Shinjuku, where a total of about 12,000 demonstrators attended. On September 19, the bill was passed by the Diet. Six days later, the organization changed its name to the current name, saying in the name-changing statement that it would "step forward to a movement that will not allow this unconstitutional legislation to be applied and will push for its repeal." On December 20, the organization co-founded the Civil Alliance for Peace and Constitutionalism with the SEALDs, Save Constitutional Democracy Japan, Mothers Against War and All Out Action Committee (Sogakari).

On October 4, 2020, five years later, Yoshihide Suga refused to approve six scholars (Sadamichi Ashina, Shigeki Uno, Masanori Okada, Ryuichi Ozawa, Takaaki Matsumiya, Yoko Kato) who attended the association to join the Science Council of Japan. Many, including many academics, suspect this rejection of appointment was due to the six academics' opposition to the government's policies, especially the 2015 military legislation. Suga denied that the refusal was politically driven, but gave no specific reason.
