= 2014 Nobel Peace Prize =

The 2014 Nobel Peace Prize
- Kailash Satyarthi and Malala Yousafzai
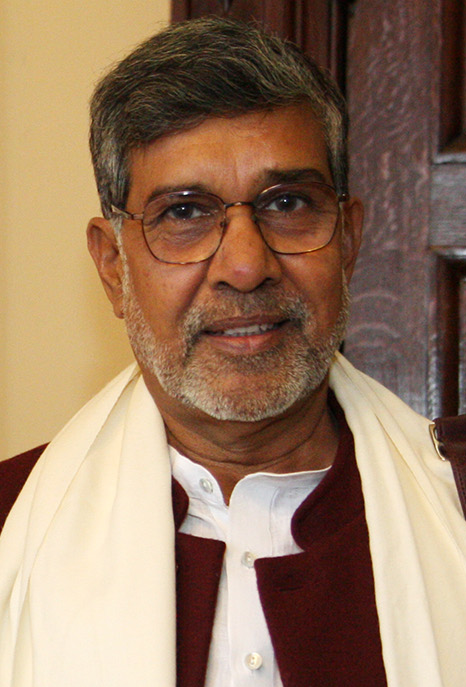
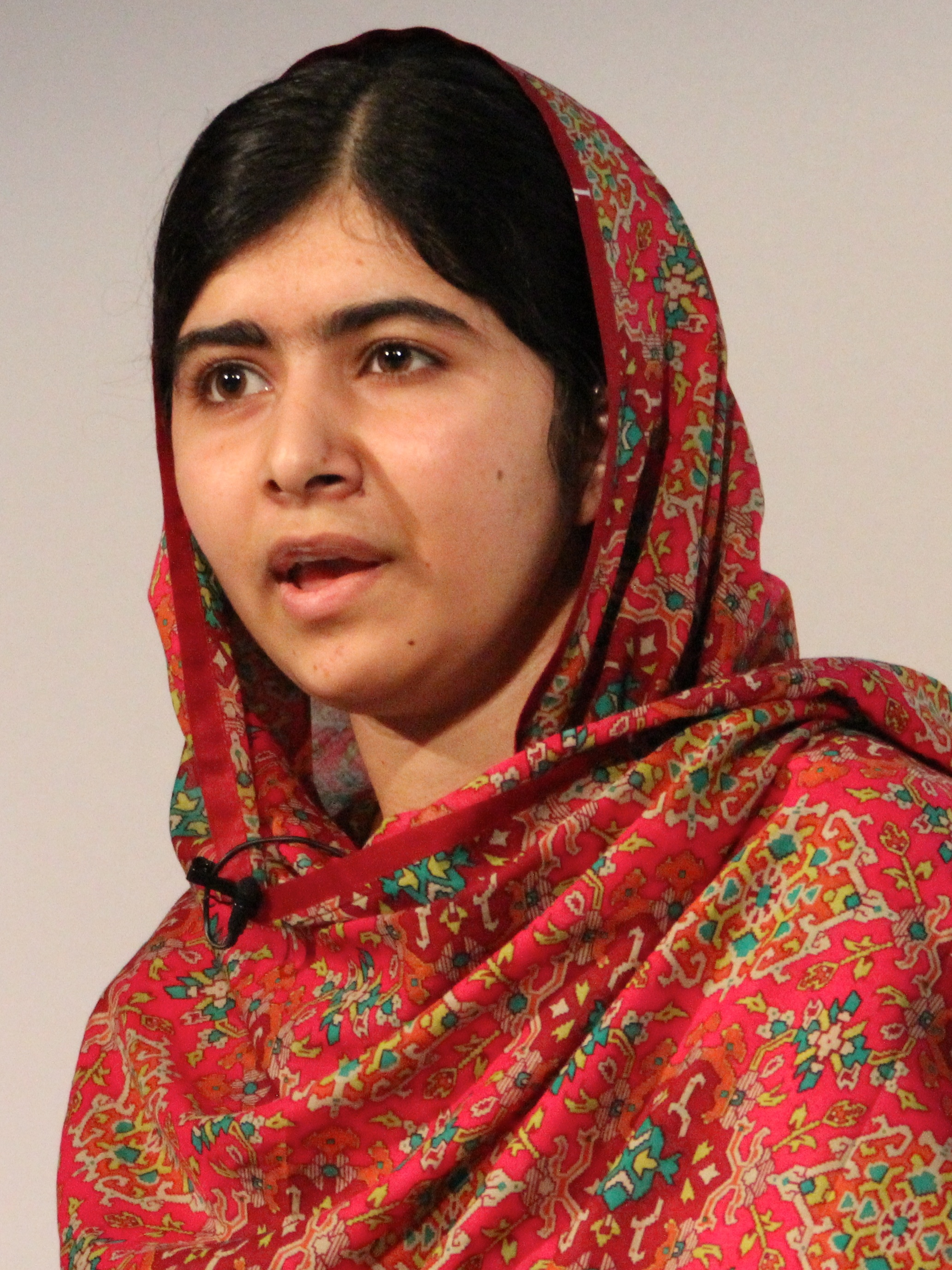
- Satyarthi (left) and Yousafzai (right) "for their struggle against the suppression of children and young people and for the right of all children to education."
- Date: 10 October 2014 (announcement by Thorbjørn Jagland); 10 December 2014 (ceremony)
- Location: Oslo, Norway
- Presented by: Norwegian Nobel Committee
- Rewards: 8 million SEK ($1.25M, €0.9M)
- First award: 1901
- Website: Official website

The 2014 Nobel Peace Prize was shared, in two equal parts, between Kailash Satyarthi (b. 1954) and Malala Yousafzai (b. 1997) "for their struggle against the suppression of children and young people and for the right of all children to education". Satyarthi is from India, the seventh person from his country to win a Nobel Prize and the second to win the Peace Prize after Mother Teresa, while Yousafzai is a Muslim from Pakistan, the second Nobel Prize winner from her country after Abdus Salam, the forty-seventh woman to win the Nobel Prize, and at the age of 17 years, the youngest winner of a Nobel Prize in any field.

== Motivation ==
In a press release, the Committee indicated that it had chosen the combination of a Hindu and a Muslim, and of an Indian and a Pakistani, on purpose, because they "join in a common struggle for education and against extremism". They stressed that "fraternity between nations" was one of the original criteria stipulated by Alfred Nobel.

The usage of child labour and discrimination against female education was the citation for the award. As of 2014 it is reckoned 168 million children are used for child labour, 60 million in India alone. This was mentioned by Thorbjørn Jagland in his handover ceremony speech.

== Nominations ==
The Nobel Prize Committee announced that it had received a record number of 278 different nominations for the Peace Prize, up from 259 in 2013. 47 of these nominations were for organizations.

== Favourites ==
Prior to the announcement, many news media speculated about who would win this year, providing lists of favourites. Often cited were Pope Francis, Ban Ki-moon, Chelsea Manning, Denis Mukwege, Edward Snowden, José Mujica, the Novaya Gazeta newspaper, and the so-called Japanese people who conserve Article 9, together with the eventual winner Malala Yousafzai. The other winner, Kailash Satyarthi, was not among the commonly cited favourites.

== See also ==
- Child labour
- Child labour in India
- Child labour in Pakistan
- Education in Pakistan
- List of female Nobel laureates
- Nobel laureates of India
- Nobel Peace Prize Concert § 2014
- Terrorism in Pakistan
