= Japanese people who conserve Article 9 =

The Japanese people who conserve Article 9 are a group of people who were among the favourites to win the 2014 Nobel Peace Prize.

== Background ==
Article 9 of the Japanese Constitution is the section of the Japanese constitution that states:

ARTICLE 9. Aspiring sincerely to an international peace based on justice and order, the Japanese people forever renounce war as a sovereign right of the nation and the threat or use of force as means of settling international disputes. To accomplish the aim of the preceding paragraph, land, sea, and air forces, as well as other war potential, will never be maintained. The right of belligerency of the state will not be recognized.

== Protest ==
Over the years, there have been different attempts to change or abolish Article 9, which was adopted in 1947. The late Shinzō Abe, who was Prime Minister of Japan between 2012 and 2020, was a supporter of making Article 9 less restrictive. In January 2013, Naomi Takasu from Zama, Kanagawa emailed the Norwegian Nobel Committee to promote Article 9 as a means to protect children. She tried to get Article 9 itself nominated for the Nobel Peace Prize, but since she didn't have the time to organise protests, she campaigned from home, by email. Joined by other people from Zama and from Sagamihara, she formed the "Organizing Committee for the Nobel Peace Prize for Article 9 of the Constitution.", which by August 2013 had gathered 24,000 signatures to support the nomination.

After receiving the petition, the Committee replied that the Prize can only be awarded to people or organizations, disqualifying the Article 9 nomination. Takasu then changed the nomination to be about the Japanese people who want to keep Article 9. Since not everyone can make nominations for the Prize, she couldn't officially nominate the group herself. A number of Japanese professors with the right qualifications supported her cause and submitted the revised nomination.

The group has continued to grow in Japan and receive support from all over the world. By June 2014, about 80,000 people had signed the petition. Notable members include Yōichi Komori, professor at the University of Tokyo and leader of the group Kyujo no Kai ("Association of Article 9"). Political reactions to the group and the chances of a Nobel Prize for it have been mixed.

== 2014 Nobel Peace Prize speculation ==
In the days running up to the announcement of the 2014 Nobel Peace Prize, there was widespread speculation that the so-called "Japanese people who conserve Article 9" group were favourites to win the prize. In the end, the winners were Kailash Satyarthi from India and Malala Yousafzai from Pakistan.

The speculation about their chances was fueled when Kristian Berg Harpviken, director of the Peace Research Institute Oslo, who each year announces his shortlist of favourites for the prize, named the group as his top for 2014 in his revised list, posted 3 October 2014.

== See also ==
- The Nobel Peace Prize for Article 9 of the Japanese Constitution
