= The Nobel Peace Prize for Article 9 of the Constitution of Japan =

The Nobel Peace Prize for Article 9 of the Japanese Constitution (憲法9条にノーベル平和賞を) is a social movement whose aim is to push for the Nobel Peace Prize to be awarded to the citizens of Japan for maintaining the country's post-war Constitution, especially Article 9.

== History ==
The movement began with an undertaking by a member of the group's Executive Committee. The Executive Committee received endorsements from influential Japanese and gathered signatures from across the world. On April 9, 2014, they received a letter from the Norwegian Nobel Committee that the committee had received the recommendation. On May 22, 2014, Hiroyuki Konishi, Yoshiko Kira and other Members of the Parliament (Diet) of Japan announced that they had submitted the recommendation via the Norwegian Embassy. The supportive 60 Diet lawmakers came from seven government parties, as well as opposition parties, indicating its cross-bench appeal.

On February 21, 2015, the Kobe branch's Executive Committee announced that they had submitted a similar recommendation, selecting political groups concerned with protecting the Peace Constitution.

== 2014–15 ==
PRIO listed the movement as one of the leading candidates for the Nobel Peace Prize in 2014. However, the Research Institute misconstrued the Japanese nation (日本国民) as a corporate name. The Nobel committee spokesperson said that it was not possible for the citizens of an entire nation to be awarded the prize. Therefore, the application was rejected.

Kristian Berg Harpviken, director of the Peace Research Institute Oslo was concerned that Shinzō Abe, Prime Minister of Japan, was trying to reinterpret Article 9 and that this could be a precursor of armed confrontation. He nominated Kenzaburō Ōe, a former Nobel laureate in literature, and the Nihon Hidankyo (日本被団協), the Japan Confederation of A- and H-Bomb Sufferers Organizations for the Nobel Peace Prize list.

== Korea ==
In response, on January 15, 2015, the group's Korean branch (일본 평화헌법9조 노벨평화상 추천 한국위원회) nominated the Article 9 Association (九条の会, Kyūjyō no kai) and Naomi Takasu (鷹巣直美) for the prize and dispatched testimonial letters and signatures of Korean citizens to the Norwegian Embassy in Seoul. Peace Research Institute Oslo included Kyūjyō no kai as one of the leading candidates (fourth place) for 2015 prize.

In South Korea, many people engaged in supportive activities and collected signatures. A total of 142 lawmakers, former Presidents and intellectuals supported the movement. In Korea itself, there is fierce competition for the Nobel Prize, indeed it is rare for Koreans to support the candidacy of foreigners, especially Japanese, for the Nobel Peace Prize. Yi Buyoung (이부영 李富榮), who is promoting the signature campaign in Korea and also a past chairman of Yeolin Uri Party (열린우리당), said that this movement was triggered by the example of Japanese opposition party legislators going against the ruling party of Japan, e.g., Ichirō Ozawa, the leader of People's Life Party, Yamamoto Tarō (生活の党と山本太郎となかまたち, Seikatsu no Tō to Yamamoto Tarō) of Japan, and former Japanese Prime Minister Tomiichi Murayama's (村山富一) attempt to get South Koreans to participate in signature-collecting drives in September 2014. On December 9, 2014, Gangwon Province (강원도, 江原道), a local government of South Korea, decided to award the "Korean DMZ Peace Prize" to the group.

== Criticism ==
Conservatives, including Miki Otaka (大高未貴), a Japanese journalist, claimed that a hidden motive behind the movement is to prevent amendments to the Japanese Constitution by anti-Japanese foreign powers as well as domestic anti-government forces.

According to a survey of 188 constitutions across the world made by Osamu Nishi (西修), an emeritus professor at Komazawa University, 158 (84%) of these constitutions also contain a peace clause (平和条項). For this reason, according to him, the statement that the Japanese Constitution is the world's only pacifist constitution is incorrect. He also claims that articles that renounce war as a sovereign right of the nation as means of settling international disputes are explicitly stated in the constitutions of Italy and Azerbaijan.

== See also ==
- Article 9 of the Japanese Constitution
- Japanese people who conserve Article 9
