= Policy Research Council of the Liberal Democratic Party =

The Policy Research Council of the Liberal Democratic Party is a policy committee of the Liberal Democratic Party, the ruling party of Japan.

== Overview ==
The Chairman of the Policy Research Council is the person responsible for deciding what policies and bills the Liberal Democratic Party should put forward. The policy compiled by the Policy Research Council is communicated to the Cabinet and reflected in the budget proposal. As long as the LDP is the ruling party, the Chairman of the Policy Research Council wields a strong influence over government policymaking. The three posts of the Secretary-General, who oversees all practical matters, including election strategies such as official endorsements, and the Chairman of the General Affairs Committee, the decision-making body, are collectively referred to as the "Three Top Party Officers". Including the Election Strategy Committee Chairman, they are also referred to as the "Four Top Party Officers."

The Research Council is made up of LDP Diet members and academic experts appointed by the party president, and is responsible for researching, drafting, and deliberating on party policies. Policies adopted by the LDP and bills submitted to the Diet must be reviewed by the Research Council. The Research Council and its subcommittees generally require unanimous consent. Investigative committees, special committees, and so on may be established as necessary.

The Policy Research Council is established as the decision-making body for the Policy Research Council. The Policy Research Council is composed of the chairman and Vice Chairman of the Policy Research Council, and policies decided by the Policy Research Council must be promptly reported to the General Affairs Council and decided upon. Once a decision is made by the General Affairs Council, party discipline is binding. The party also established the House of Councillors Policy Council as an internal organ within the House of Councillors.

== Organization ==
=== Subcommittees (14) ===
- Cabinet First Committee
- Cabinet Second Committee
- National Defense Committee
- General Affairs Committee
- Legal Affairs Committee
- Foreign Affairs Committee
- Finance and Banking Committee
- Education, Culture, Sports, Science and Technology Division
- Health, Labor and Welfare Committee
- Agriculture and Forestry Division
- Fisheries Division
- Economic and Industrial Affairs Division
- Land Infrastructure and Transport Subcommittee
- Environmental Committee

=== Investigation Committee ===
- Financial Research Council
- Competition Policy Research Council
- Intellectual Property Strategy Research Committee
- Small and Medium Enterprise Policy Research Council
- ITS Promotion and Road Investigation Committee
- International Cooperation Research Committee
- Information and Communications Strategy Research Council
- Judicial System Research Council
- Public Safety and Counterterrorism Research Committee
- Resource and Energy Strategy Research Committee
- Science, Technology and Innovation Strategy Research Council
- Agriculture, Forestry and Fisheries Strategy Research Council
- Research Council on Consumer Affairs
- Tax System Research Council
- Research Council on Employment Issues
- Sports Nation Research Committee
- Environment and Global Warming Countermeasures Research Committee
- Security Research Council
- National Resilience Comprehensive Research Council
- Housing, Land and Urban Policy Research Council
- Railway Development Research Committee for Shinkansen and Other Lines
- Election System Research Committee
- Cultural Tradition Research Committee
- Food Education Research Committee
- Tourism Nation Research Council
- Northern Territories Research Council
- Okinawa Promotion Research Committee
- PFI Research Committee
- Committee for Promoting Healthy Youth Development
- Food Industry Research Council
- Research Committee on Nuclear Policy and Supply-Demand Issues
- Research Committee on Issues for Children and Adults with Disabilities

=== Special committees ===
- Special Committee on Space and Ocean Development
- G Spatial Information Utilization Promotion Special Committee
- Special Committee on Superconducting Linear Railways
- Aviation Policy Special Committee
- Special Committee on Shipping and Shipbuilding
- Special Committee on Traffic Safety Measures
- Special Committee on Disaster Prevention
- Special Committee on Urban Parks and Green Spaces
- Special Committee on Sewerage and Septic Tank Measures
- Special Committee on Depopulation Countermeasures
- Tobacco Special Committee
- Special Committee on Bird and Animal Damage Prevention
- Special Committee for Public Interest Corporations/NPOs, etc.
- Special Committee on Measures for a Declining Population Society
- Special Committee on Foreign Workers, etc.
- Hokkaido Comprehensive Promotion Special Committee
- Mountain village promotion special committee
- Remote Island Promotion Special Committee
- Amami Promotion Special Committee
- Peninsula Promotion Special Committee
- Special Committee on Whaling
- Special Committee on Heavy Snowfall Countermeasures
- Special Committee on Volcano Countermeasures

=== Special mission committees ===
- Special Committee on Territorial Affairs
- Special Committee on Security and Land Law
- Special Committee on the Return of War Remains
- Special Committee on Social Security Systems
- Special Committee for Promoting Telework
- Special Committee for the Promotion of the Cool Japan Strategy
- Special Committee on IT Strategy
- Special Committee for the Promotion of Career Education
- Special Committee to Protect Family Ties
- Special Committee on Strengthening Employment Support for Released Prisoners
- Special Committee on Water Strategy
- Special Committee on Global Health Strategy
- Special Committee to Restore Japan's Honor and Trust
- Special Committee on Fiscal Reconstruction
- Special Committee on Postal Services
- Special Committee on the Age of Majority
- Special Committee on the Japanese Meister System
