= SEALDs =

2015–2016 activist group in Japan

Students Emergency Action for Liberal Democracy
- 自由と民主主義のための学生緊急行動
- Abbreviation: SEALDs
- Formation: 3 May 2015
- Founder: Aki Okuda (co-founder)
- Dissolved: 15 August 2016; 10 years ago
- Type: Student activist group
- Location: Japan
- Members: ~400 core members

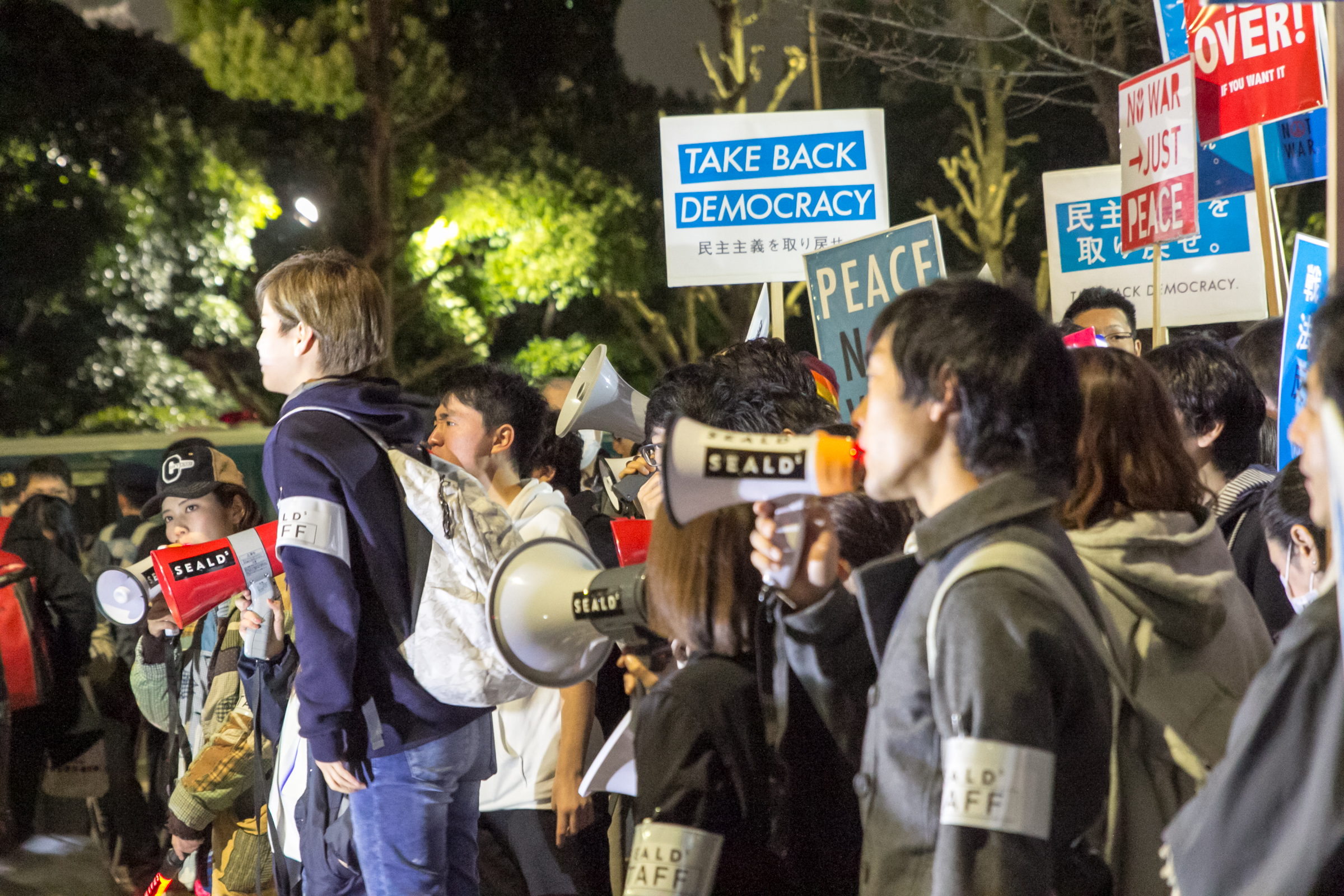
Demonstration near the National Diet Building, March 2016

SEALDs, short for Students Emergency Action for Liberal Democracy (自由と民主主義のための学生緊急行動, Jiyū to minshu shugi no tame no gakusei kinkyū kōdō), was a student activist organisation in Japan that organised protests against the ruling coalition headed by Prime Minister Shinzo Abe in 2015 and 2016. Its focus was on the Legislation for Peace and Security enacted in 2015 that allow the Japanese Self-Defense Force to be deployed overseas in certain conditions.

== Founding ==
Most of the core members of the SEALDs were involved with a predecessor movement, Students Against Secret Protection Law (SASPL), that protested against Shinzo Abe's Special Secrecy Law from February to December 2014. After the secrecy law was passed, the members went on to form SEALDs on May 3, 2015, Constitution Memorial Day in Japan, to highlight what they believed was Shinzo Abe's blatant disregard of the Constitution. They were especially worried that the Abe cabinet, which enjoyed a majority in both Houses of the Japanese Parliament, would railroad their legislation to reinterpret Article 9 of the Japanese Constitution, allowing Japan to exercise the right of collective self-defence and potentially deploy troops on foreign soil. Such legislation was passed on September 19, 2015.

== Activities and developments ==
On August 30, 2015, the SEALDs was among protesters who surrounded the National Diet Building in Tokyo. Estimates of the size of the crowd ranged from 30,000 to 120,000. Such a large student movement had not emerged in Japan since the anti-war protests of the 1960s, which forced Shinzo Abe's grandfather Nobusuke Kishi to resign as Prime Minister. However, in contrast to the Zengakuren, whose radicalism eventually alienated the public in the 1960s, the SEALDs attempted to be moderate and non-partisan.

Branches of SEALDs sprang up in various places around Japan. SEALDs KANSAI was established in May 2015, SEALDs TOHOKU on July 20, SEALDs RYUKYU in Okinawa on August 15, and SEALDs TOKAI in Nagoya on September 7. On December 20, 2015, SEALDs co-founded the Civil Alliance for Peace and Constitutionalism with the Association of Scholars Opposed to the Security-related Laws, Save Constitutional Democracy Japan, Mothers Against War and All Out Action Committee (Sogakari). The security laws were enacted on March 29, 2016. SEALDs organised a protest in front of the Parliament building the day before.

SEALDs' activities ranged from holding demonstrations, protest rallies and marches, organizing study groups and talk events, to creating booklets, pamphlets and videos, using social media. They also moved around the country to support various movements and candidates, such as the protests in Okinawa against the US military base and the Hokkaido by-elections in April 2016.

SEALDs disbanded on August 15, 2016, one month after the ruling Liberal Democratic Party won a supermajority in the Upper House election. However, co-founder Aki Okuda (奥田 愛基) stated that the campaign was not over and urged all of Japan's politicians to continue to protect the Constitution.
