= List of Japanese operations during World War II =

This is a list of known Japanese operations planned, executed or aborted during the Second World War.

List of Japanese operations during World War II
Operation	Year	Description
Operation FU	1940	invasion of French Indo-China
Operation AI	1941	attack on Pearl Harbor, Hawaii, United States
Operation DE	1941	invasion of Dutch East Indies
Operation T	1941	invasion of Thailand
Operation E	1941	invasion of China and Northeast British Malaya
Operation M	1941	invasion of the Philippine Islands
Operation B	1941	invasion of British Borneo and Dutch Borneo
Operation AL	1942	invasion of the Aleutian Islands, Alaska, United States
Operation B	1942	invasion of Burma
Operation C	1942	reconnaissance and raid operations in the Indian Ocean
Operation D	1942	invasion of the Andaman Islands
Operation H: Invasion of Celebes (1942); Battle of Ambon; Battle of Timor	1942	invasion of Celebes, Ambon and Timor
Operation J	1942	invasion of Java, Netherlands East Indies
Operation K	1942	reconnaissance and air raid on Pearl Harbor, Hawaii, United States
Operation Ka	1942	plan to destroy the American fleet and recapture Guadalcanal, Solomon Islands
Operation L	1942	landing operation in Palembang, Sumatra
Operation MI	1942	aborted invasion of Midway Island
Operation MO	1942	aborted invasion of Port Moresby, New Guinea
Operation R	1942	invasion of Rabaul, New Britain and Kavieng, New Ireland
Operation SR	1942	invasion of Lae and Salamaua, New Guinea
( Operation ? )	1942	attack along the Kokoda track (New Guinea)
Operation T	1942	invasion of northern Sumatra
Operation U	1942	invasion of Burma
Operation RY	1942	invasion of Nauru and Ocean islands
Operation KE	1943	evacuation of Guadalcanal, Solomon Islands
Operation I	1943	air raid against Allied advances on New Guinea and Guadalcanal, Solomon Islands
Operation SE	1943	air raid against Allied forces staging around Guadalcanal area
Operation KE (Kiska evacuation)	1943	evacuation of Kiska, Aleutian Islands, Alaska, United States
Operation RO	1943	defensive plan against Allied attacks on Rabaul, New Britain
Operation Ta	1943	attack on Bougainville in the Solomon Islands
Operation A-Go	1944	attack of the American fleet off Saipan, Mariana Islands
Operation Ban-Go	1944	defensive operation at the Irrawaddy River in Burma
Operation Dan-Go	1944	operation after the failed operation U-Go offensive in India
Operation FS	1944	cancelled plan to isolate Australia by capturing New Caledonia, Samoa, and Fiji
Operation Fu-Go	1944	aerial bombing of the United States via balloons
Operation Ha-Go	1944	action to isolate and destroy Anglo-Indian forces at Arakan, Burma; precursor to operation U-Go
Operation Ichi-Go	1944	attack in Eastern China to link up Northern China and Indochina
Operation Kan-Go	1944	defensive plan in Southern Burma
Operation Kon	1944	defensive operation on Biak Island, New Guinea
Operation Sho I	1944	defence plan for the Philippine Islands; part of operation Sho-Go
Operation Sho II	1944	defence plan for Formosa (Taiwan); part of operation Sho-Go
Operation Sho III	1944	defence plan for the Ryukyu Islands including Okinawa; part of operation Sho-Go
Operation Sho IV	1944	defence plan for Hokkaido and the Kuril Islands; part of operation Sho-Go
Operation Sho-Go	1944	defence plan against American advances toward Japan
Operation Ta	1944	attack on American forces at Cape Torokina, Bougainville, Solomon Islands
Operation TA	1944	convoys in and out of the Philippines.
Operation Take-Ichi	1944	convoys to the Doberai Peninsula in Western New Guinea
Operation To-Go	1944	phase one of Japanese attack in Eastern China; part of operation Ichi-Go
Operation U-Go	1944	assault on Imphal and Kohima, India
Operation Yu (also Operation Tatsumaki)	1944	surprise attack raid on American shipping at Majuro atoll
Operation Tatsumaki	1944	see Operation Yu
Operation Arashi	1945	air raid on Ulithi Atoll, Caroline Islands
Operation Hikari	1945	reconnaissance of Ulithi Atoll, Caroline Islands; part of operation Arashi
Operation Ketsu-Go	1945	defence plan against potential American invasion of the Japanese home islands
Operation Kikusui	1945	special attack against American ships off Okinawa, Japan
Operation Tan 2	1945	special attack mission against the Allied anchorage at Ulithi, Caroline Islands
Operation Ten-Go	1945	defence plan in 1945, consisting of four likely scenarios. Operation Ten'ichi-Go, the first scenario in Ten-Go, is a reaction plan against Allied invasion of Okinawa.
Operation Ken	1945	cancelled operation to use transports to land suicide troops on American airfields in the Mariana Islands
Operation Kon-Go	1945	cancelled offensive against American ships using manned torpedoes

== See also ==
- Japanese expansion (1941–1942)
