= Article 96 of the Constitution of Japan =

Clause specifying process for making amendments in Japan

Article 96 of the Constitution of Japan is a clause in the Constitution of Japan specifying the process for making amendments. Details of the process is determined by the Diet Act and the Act on Procedures for Amendment of the Constitution of Japan. The Constitution has remained unchanged since coming into effect on May 3, 1947, and many politicians are calling for a revision of Article 96 so that they can begin revising other, more central Articles (like Article 9).

== Text of the article ==
The full text of the article in Japanese, and its official English translation, reads:

第九十六条 この憲法の改正は、各議院の総議員の三分の二以上の賛成で、国会が、これを発議し、国民に提案してその承認を経なければならない。この承認には、特別の国民投票又は国会の定める選挙の際行はれる投票において、その過半数の賛成を必要とする。
２ 憲法改正について前項の承認を経たときは、天皇は、国民の名で、この憲法と一体を成すものとして、直ちにこれを公布する。

ARTICLE 96. (1) Amendments to this Constitution shall be initiated by the Diet, through a concurring vote of two-thirds or more of all the members of each House and shall thereupon be submitted to the people for ratification, which shall require the affirmative vote of a majority of all votes cast thereon, at a special referendum or at such election as the Diet shall specify.
(2) Amendments when so ratified shall immediately be promulgated by the Emperor in the name of the people, as an integral part of this Constitution.

== Debate ==
The Japanese Constitution has not been revised since it was first created in 1947. By contrast, the United States has made six constitutional amendments since WWII, and France has made twenty-seven: two for the constitution of the Fourth Republic and twenty-five for the constitution of the Fifth. Since then, many Japanese have advocated for revisions to numerous articles but they have been unable to gain the support of two-thirds (a supermajority) of both houses of the National Diet (both the House of Councillors and the House of Representatives), let alone the simple majority of the Japanese electorate in the subsequent referendum vote (as required by Article 96). As such, proponents of revision have set their sights on Article 96, hoping to revise it so that amendments no longer require a supermajority in the Diet. The primary motive behind the revision of Article 96 appears to be the revision of Article 9, which "renounce war as a sovereign right of the nation" and promises that "land, sea, and air forces, as well as other war potential, will never be maintained". However, other Articles (like Article 97 regarding fundamental human rights) have also been proposed for revision or deletion. Some scholars think Article 96 cannot be amended because this article defines the power to exercise constituent power which is a constituted power created by the constituent power, and constituent power itself cannot be changed by the Constitution.

Shinzo Abe, the former Prime Minister of Japan, was a vocal proponent of revising Article 96, stating that "It's unfair that just more than one-third of lawmakers could block revisions even if 50 percent or more of the public want to amend the Constitution". Given that his Liberal Democratic Party had control of both Houses of the National Diet (for the first time in nearly a decade), political pundits say that he has a fair chance to succeed. However, the Liberal Democratic Party's coalition partner, New Komeito, may be unwilling to support such a change, and in fact, the Liberal Democratic Party appeared to drop the issue from its platform in the run up to the House of Councillors election in 2013. Moreover, the Japanese population appears to be roughly divided regarding the revision of Article 96, with 42% in favor and 46% against according to a recent Mainichi Shimbun poll. A separate NHK survey showed that nearly 50% of Japanese had no opinion on the subject.

The LDP's proposed constitutional amendment would amend Article 96 as follows:

この憲法の改正は、衆議院又は参議院の議員の発議により、両議院のそれぞれの総議員の過半数の賛成で国会が議決し、国民に提案してその承認を得なければならない。この承認には、法律の定めるところにより行われる国民の投票において有効投票の過半数の賛成を必要とする。

Amendments to this Constitution shall be initiated by a member of either the House of Representatives or House of Councillors and resolved by the Diet through a concurring vote of a majority of all the members of both Houses, and shall thereupon be submitted to the people for ratification, which shall require the affirmative vote of a majority of all valid votes cast in a popular election conducted as provided by law.
