= Article 9 of the Constitution of Japan =

Clause outlawing war to settle disputes

Article 9 of the Constitution of Japan (日本国憲法第9条, Nihon koku kenpō dai kyū-jō) is a clause in the Constitution of Japan outlawing war as a means to settle international disputes involving the state. The Constitution was drafted following the surrender of Japan in World War II. It came into effect on 3 May 1947 during the occupation of Japan by the Allies, which lasted until 28 April 1952. In its text, the state formally renounces the sovereign right of belligerency and aims at an international peace based on justice and order. The article also states that, to accomplish these aims, armed forces with war potential will not be maintained. The Constitution was imposed by U.S. military occupation (Supreme Commander for the Allied Powers) to prevent rearmament of Japan in the post–World War II period. This condition was a similar prohibition placed on post-war Germany, to be overseen by the United Kingdom, after World War I. However, Germany remilitarized anyway in the decades following despite this prohibition under the Weimar Republic and later Adolf Hitler's regime. This was a leading call for the Allied mandate, and the continuing US defense agreements that would render aid in maintaining Japanese sovereignty in the event of a foreign attack.

There are the post-occupation U.S. military stationed in Japan under the U.S.–Japan Mutual Cooperation and Security Treaty and Japan Self-Defense Forces (JSDF) which was founded in 1954 as de facto postwar Japanese military. Prime Minister Shinzo Abe approved a reinterpretation which gave more powers to the JSDF in 2014, which was passed by the Legislation for Peace and Security in 2015.

== Text of the article ==
The full text of the article in Japanese:

第二章 戦争の放棄

第九条 日本国民は、正義と秩序を基調とする国際平和を誠実に希求し、国権の発動たる戦争と、武力による威嚇又は武力の行使は、国際紛争を解決する手段としては、永久にこれを放棄する。

② 前項の目的を達するため、陸海空軍その他の戦力は、これを保持しない。国の交戦権は、これを認めない。

The official English translation of the article is:

Article 9. Aspiring sincerely to an international peace based on justice and order, the Japanese people forever renounce war as a sovereign right of the nation and the threat or use of force as means of settling international disputes.
In order to accomplish the aim of the preceding paragraph, land, sea, and air forces, as well as other war potential, will never be maintained. The right of belligerency of the state will not be recognized.

== Historical background ==
The failure of the collective security of the League of Nations led to the realization that a universal system of security could only be effective if nations agreed to some limitation of their national sovereignty with regard to their right to belligerency, and if the Security Council which had been a "closed shop" during League of Nations times, would open itself up to U.N. Members who would cede constitutional powers in favor of collective security. Like the German Article 24, which was incorporated in the post-war German Constitution, and which provides for delegating or limiting sovereign powers in favor of collective security, Article 9 was added to the 1947 constitution during the occupation that lasted until 28 April 1952 following the defeat of Japan in the World War II.

The source of the pacifist clause is disputed. According to the Allied Supreme Commander Douglas MacArthur (in statements made at a time when the U.S. was trying to get Japan to re-arm), the provision was suggested by Prime Minister Kijūrō Shidehara, who "wanted it to prohibit any military establishment for Japan—any military establishment whatsoever". Shidehara's perspective was that retention of arms would be "meaningless" for the Japanese in the post-war era, because any substandard post-war military would no longer gain the respect of the people, and would actually cause people to obsess with the subject of rearming Japan. Shidehara admitted to his authorship in his memoirs Gaikō Gojū-Nen (Fifty Years' Diplomacy), published in 1951, where he described how the idea came to him on a train journey to Tokyo; MacArthur himself confirmed Shidehara's authorship on several occasions. However, according to some interpretations, he denied having done so, and the inclusion of Article 9 was mainly brought about by the members of the Government Section of the Supreme Commander for the Allied Powers, especially Charles Kades, one of Douglas MacArthur's closest associates. There is, however, another theory by constitutional scholar Toshiyoshi Miyazawa, which is supported by significant evidence provided by other historians, that the idea came from MacArthur himself and that Shidehara was merely a pawn in his plans. Most recent research, however, has conclusively corroborated Shidehara's authorship.

After World War II, the Japanese government began revising the Constitution. However, it initially intended only limited changes to the Constitution of the Empire of Japan, such as consolidating the Army and Navy under the single term “military” and requiring parliamentary approval for military actions.

On February 8, 1946 (Shōwa 21), the “Outline of Constitutional Revision” (the so-called Matsumoto Draft), prepared by the Constitutional Problems Investigation Committee chaired by Jōji Matsumoto, was submitted to the General Headquarters of the Supreme Commander for the Allied Powers (GHQ).

In response, GHQ sought to ensure the renunciation of war and military forces. This objective was reflected in the “MacArthur Notes,” which set forth three guiding principles for the drafting of the new constitution. These were presented by Supreme Commander Douglas MacArthur to Government Section Chief Courtney Whitney, who was responsible for preparing the draft.

The second of these principles stated:

War as a sovereign right of the nation is abolished. Japan renounces it as an instrumentality for settling its disputes and even for preserving its own security. It relies upon the higher ideals which are now stirring the world for its defense and its protection. No Japanese Army, Navy, or Air Force will ever be authorized and no rights of belligerency will ever be conferred upon any Japanese force.

— MacArthur Notes

The “GHQ Draft” (also known as the MacArthur Draft), prepared in accordance with these principles, included a provision corresponding to the present Article 9. At this stage, it was designated as Article 8.

Chapter II Renunciation of War

Article VIII War as a sovereign right of the nation is abolished. The threat or use of force is forever renounced as a means for settling disputes with any other nation.

No army, navy, air force, or other war potential will ever be authorized and no rights of belligerency will ever be conferred upon the State.

— The GHQ Draft

The House of Representatives amended the Article and added "Aspiring sincerely to an international peace based on justice and order," to Paragraph 1 and "In order to accomplish the aim of the preceding paragraph," to Paragraph 2. Hitoshi Ashida made this tenor. SCAP did not object to this amendment. Many scholars think the Government of Japan does not renounce the right (to have power) of self-defence because of this amendment. (Note: The interpretation of the Paragraph 1 is based on the Kellogg–Briand Pact.)

The article was endorsed by the Imperial Diet of Japan on 3 November 1946. Kades later made statements, like MacArthur at a time when the U.S. was trying to get Japan to rearm, that suggested he had initially rejected the proposed language that prohibited Japan's use of force "for its own security", believing that self-preservation was the right of every nation. The historical record, however, casts doubt on this revisionist interpretation.

== Interpretation ==
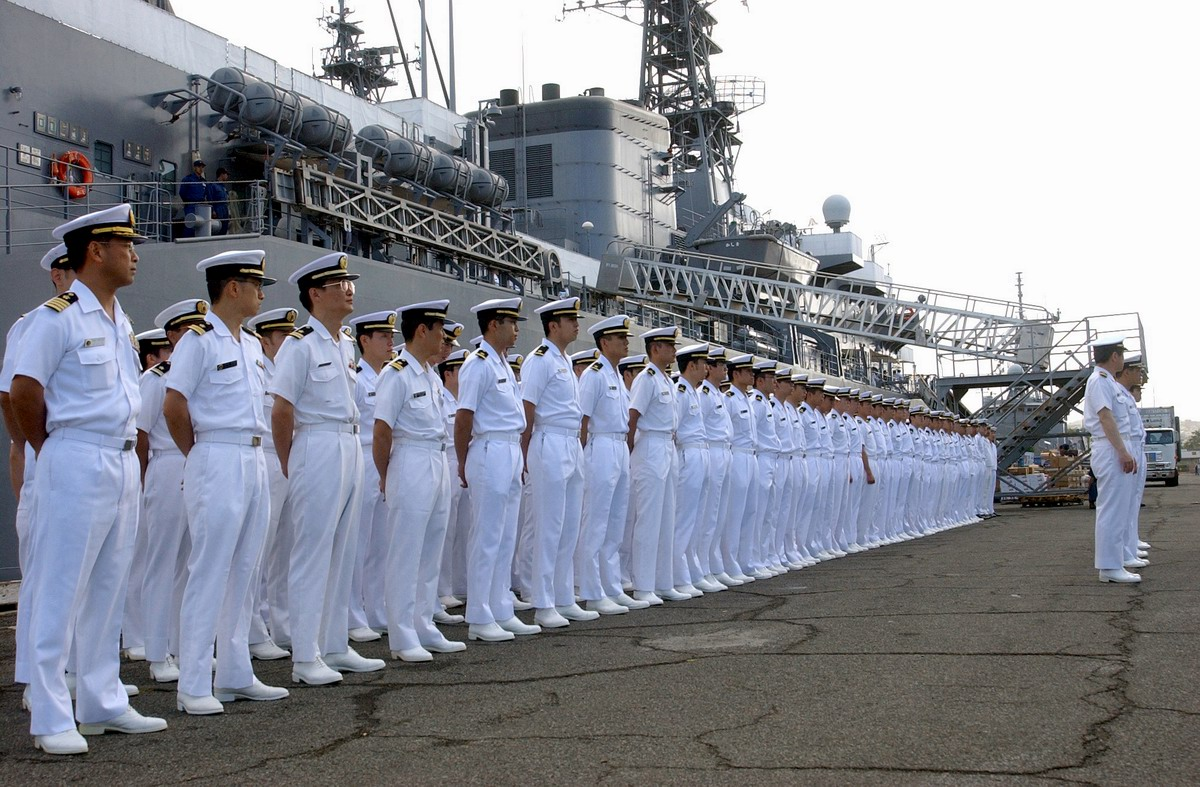
Sailors of the Japanese Maritime Self-Defense Force, one of the de facto military forces ostensibly permitted under Article 9

Soon after the adoption of the Constitution of Japan on 3 May 1947, the Chinese Civil War ended in victory for the Chinese Communist Party in 1949 and the establishment of the People's Republic of China (PRC). As a consequence, the United States was left without the Republic of China (ROC) on Mainland China as a military ally against communism in the Pacific. There was a desire on the part of the United States occupation forces for Japan to take a more active military role in the struggle against communism during the Cold War.

If Article 9 is looked upon as a motion to abolish war as an institution—as envisaged in the 1961 McCloy–Zorin Accords—then the Korean crisis was the first opportunity for another country to second the Japanese motion and embark on the transition toward a true system of collective security under the United Nations. In fact, however, in 1950, following the outbreak of the Korean War, the U.S. 24th Infantry Division was pulled out of Japan and sent to fight on the front lines in Korea, and so Japan was left without any armed protection. MacArthur ordered the creation of a 75,000-strong National Police Reserve (警察予備隊, Keisatsu yobitai) to maintain order in Japan and repel any possible invasion from outside. The NPR was organized by United States Army Col. Frank Kowalski (later a U.S. congressman) using Army surplus equipment. To avoid possible constitutional violations, military items were given civilian names: tanks, for instance, were named "special vehicles". Mosaburō Suzuki, a leader of the Japan Socialist Party, brought suit in the Supreme Court of Japan to have the NPR declared unconstitutional: however, his case was dismissed by the Grand Bench for lack of relevance.

On 1 August 1952, a new National Safety Agency (保安庁, Hoancho) was formed to supervise the NPR and its maritime component. The new agency was directly headed by Prime Minister Shigeru Yoshida. Yoshida supported its constitutionality: although he stated in a 1952 Diet committee session that "to maintain war potential, even for the purpose of self-defense, [would] necessitate revision of the Constitution". He later responded to the JSP's constitutionality claims by stating that the NSF had no true war potential in the modern era. In 1954, the National Safety Agency became the Japan Defense Agency (now Ministry of Defense), and the National Police Reserve became the Japan Self-Defense Forces (自衛隊, Jieitai).

In practice, the Japan Self-Defense Forces (JSDF) are very well equipped and the maritime forces are considered to be stronger than the navies of some of Japan's neighbors. The Supreme Court of Japan has reinforced the constitutionality of armed self-defense in several major rulings, most notably the Sunakawa Case of 1959, which upheld the legality of the then-current U.S.–Japan Security Treaty.

=== 2014 reinterpretation ===
In July 2014, Prime Minister Shinzo Abe (coalition government of the Liberal Democratic and Komeito Party) approved a reinterpretation of Article 9. This reinterpretation allows Japan to exercise the right of "collective self-defense" in some instances and to engage in military action if one of its allies were to be attacked. The Japanese National Diet made the reinterpretation official in September 2015 by enacting a series of laws allowing the Japan Self-Defense Forces to provide material support to allies engaged in combat internationally in an "existential crisis situation" for Japan. The stated justification was that failing to defend or support an ally would weaken alliances and endanger Japan.

It is considered by some parties as illegitimate since the Prime Minister circumvented the constitutional amendment procedure, dictating a radical change to the meaning of fundamental principles in the Constitution by way of Cabinet fiat without Diet debate, vote, or public approval. International reaction to this move was mixed. China expressed a negative view of this reinterpretation, while the US, the Philippines, Vietnam, and Indonesia reacted positively. The government of South Korea did not oppose the reinterpretation, but noted that it would not approve of JSDF operations in and around the Korean peninsula without its request or approval, and called upon Japan to act in a way that would win the trust of neighboring states.

In May 2017, Japanese Prime Minister Abe set a 2020 deadline for revising Article 9, which would legitimize the JSDF in the Constitution. Abe retired in 2020 due to health problems without revising Article 9.

== Debate ==
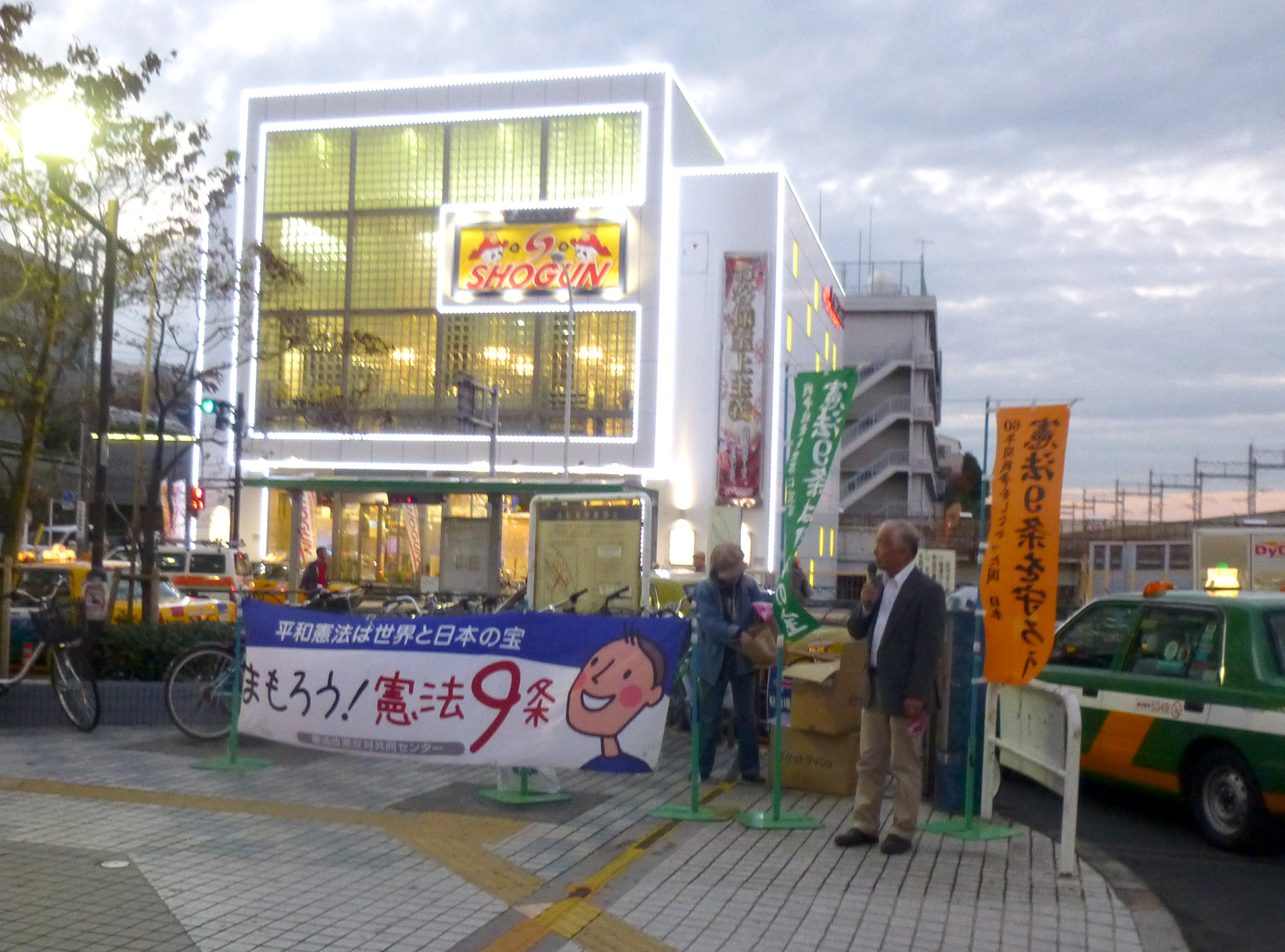
A demonstration in favor of maintaining Article 9, in front of Tabata Station, in Tokyo (2012)

Article 9 of the Constitution of Japan is best understood as having three distinct elements: (1) a provision that prohibits the use of force (paragraph one); (2) a provision that prohibits the maintenance of armed forces or "other war potential" (paragraph two, clause one); and (3) a denial of the rights of belligerency. It is helpful to keep these distinct elements in mind in considering the operation and effect of Article 9. Paragraph one, which prohibits the use of force has been highly effective in constraining Japanese foreign policy, with the result that Japan has not used force or been engaged in armed conflict since the promulgation of the Constitution. During the Gulf War of 1991, the government of Japan sought to join the U.S. coalition formed to drive Iraq out of Kuwait, but was informed by the Director of the Cabinet Legislation Bureau that doing so would constitute a use of force in violation of Article 9 paragraph one - so Japan was limited to providing financial assistance.

The second element of Article 9, which prohibits Japan from maintaining an army, navy or air force, has been highly controversial, and arguably less effective in shaping policy. From one perspective, one implication of the provision is that in strictly legal terms, the Japan Self-Defense Forces are not land, sea or air forces, but are extensions of the national police force. This has had broad implications for foreign, security and defense policy. According to the Japanese government, "'war potential' in paragraph two means force exceeding a minimum level necessary for self-defense. Anything at or below that level does not constitute war potential." Apparently when the JSDF was created, "since the capability of the JSDF was inadequate to sustain a modern war, it was not war potential". Seemingly, the Japanese government has looked for loopholes in the wording of the peace clause and the "constitutionality of the Japanese military has been challenged numerous times". Some Japanese people believe that Japan should be truly pacifist and claim that the JSDF is unconstitutional. The Supreme Court, however, has ruled that it is within the nation's right to have the capacity to defend itself. Scholars have also discussed "constitutional transformation ... [which] occurs when a constitutional provision has lost its effectiveness but has been replaced by a new meaning". The use of private military companies is also ambiguous in nature and subjected to various interpretations.

The Liberal Democratic Party has advocated changing the context of Article 9 since 1955, when Article 9 was interpreted as renouncing the use of warfare in international disputes, but not the internal use of force for the purpose of maintaining law and order. The LDP's longtime coalition partner Komeito have long opposed changing the context of Article 9. The LDP have never had the necessary supermajority (two-thirds of votes in both Houses) in the National Diet to change the Constitution, despite it having a supermajority with Komeito from 2005 to 2009 and from 2012 to 2021.

The main opposition party, the Constitutional Democratic Party of Japan, tends to concur with the LDP's interpretation. At the same time, both parties have advocated the revision of Article 9 by adding an extra clause explicitly authorizing the use of force for the purpose of self-defense against aggression directed against the Japanese nation. The Japan Socialist Party, on the other hand, had considered the JSDF as unconstitutional and advocated the full implementation of Article 9 through the demilitarization of Japan. When the party joined with the LDP to form a coalition government, it reversed its position and recognized the JSDF as a structure that was constitutional. The Japanese Communist Party considers the JSDF unconstitutional and has called for reorganization of Japanese defense policy to feature an armed militia.

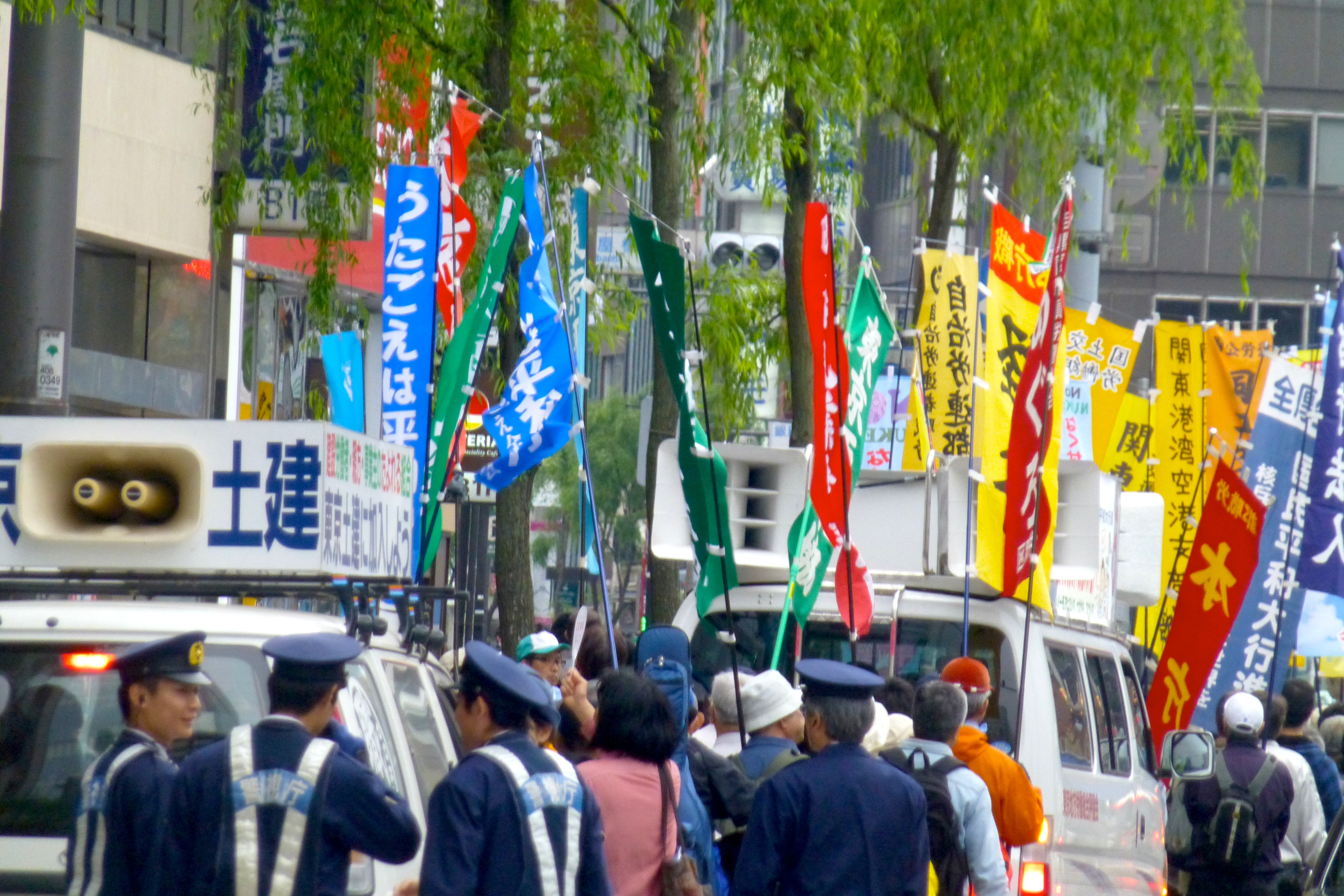
Nobori flags held by a group of pro-Article 9 demonstrators and their police escort, near Ginza (2014)

At present, the government interprets Article 9 to mean that Japan cannot possess offensive military weapons; this has been interpreted to mean that Japan cannot have:

- ICBMs,
- all types of weapons of mass destruction (e.g. nuclear weapons),
- aircraft carriers or
- bomber fleets.

This has not inhibited the deployment of:

- submarines,
- AEGIS-equipped destroyers,
- helicopter carriers (including a plan to have at least two helicopter carriers operate V/STOL fighters),
- fighter aircraft, and a plan for land-attack cruise missiles and
- unmanned aerial vehicles,

all of which have substantial, and multi-mission, combat potential.

Offensive cyberwarfare operations has been ambiguous in nature and subjected to various interpretations.

Since the late 1990s, Article 9 has been the central feature of a dispute over the ability of Japan to undertake multilateral military commitments overseas. During the late 1980s, increases in government appropriations for the JSDF averaged more than 5% per year. By 1990 Japan was ranked third, behind the then-Soviet Union and the United States, in total defense expenditures, and the United States urged Japan to assume a larger share of the burden of defense of the western Pacific. (Japan has a guideline of a limit of 1% of GDP on defense spending; Japan defines a number of activities as non-defense spending.) Given these circumstances, some have viewed Article 9 as increasingly irrelevant. It has remained an important brake on the growth of Japan's military capabilities. Despite the fading of bitter wartime memories, the general public, according to opinion polls, continued to show strong support for this constitutional provision.

The different views can be clearly organized into four categories:

- The pacifists believe in maintaining Article 9 and claim the JSDF is unconstitutional, and would like to detach Japan from international wars. A stricter interpretation could also include peacekeeping operations.
- The mercantilists have divided opinions about Article 9 although the interpretation is broadened to include the JSDF, and believe that the JSDF's role should be retained to activities related to the United Nations and for non-combat purposes. They advocate minimal defense spending, and emphasize economic growth.
- The normalists "call for incremental armament for national defense and accept using military force to maintain international peace and security". They support the revision of Article 9 to include a clause explaining the existence and function of the JSDF.
- The nationalists assert that Japan should remilitarize and build nuclear capabilities in order to regain pride and independence. They also advocate revision or, in extreme cases, the repeal and abolishment of Article 9 to promote renewed rearmament.

Evidently, opinions range from one extreme of pacifism, to the other extreme of nationalism and complete remilitarization. The majority of Japanese citizens approve the spirit of Article 9 and consider it personally important. But since the 1990s, there has been a shift away from a stance that would tolerate no alteration of the article to allowing a revision that would resolve the discord between the JSDF and Article 9. Additionally, quite a few citizens consider that Japan should allow itself to commit the Japan Self-Defense Forces to collective defense efforts, like those agreed to on the UN Security Council in the Gulf War, for instance. Japan's ability to "engage in collective defense" has been argued. The involvement of Japan in the Gulf War of 1990, or lack of involvement, has provoked significant criticism. Despite U.S. pressure on Japan to assist America in Iraq, Japan limited their involvement in the war to financial contribution primarily because of domestic opposition to the deployment of troops. As a result of the painfully ardent disapproval from the U.S. during the Gulf War, Japan was quick to act after the September 11 attacks in 2001. It was clear that "the 11 September attacks led to increased U.S. demands for Japanese security cooperation". On October 29, 2001, the Anti-Terrorism Special Measures Law was passed, which "further broadened the definition of Japan's self-defense". The law allowed Japan to support the U.S. military on foreign territory. This law provoked "citizen groups [to] file lawsuits against the Japanese government in order to stop the dispatch of JSDF troops to Iraq and to confirm the unconstitutionality of such a dispatch", though the troops sent to Iraq were not sent for combat but for humanitarian aid. Japan has actively built U.S.–Japan relations precisely because of Article 9 and Japan's inability to engage in an offensive war. It has been debated that, "when [Koizumi] declared support for the U.S.-led war on Iraq in March 2003, and when he sent Japanese forces to aid the occupation in January 2004, it was not Iraq that was in the Japanese sights so much as North Korea". Japan's unstable relations with North Korea, as well as other neighboring Asian countries has forced Japan to batter and bend Article 9 to "permit an increasingly expansive interpretation" of the constitution in the hopes of guaranteeing U.S. support in these relations.

Former Prime Minister Nobusuke Kishi said in a speech, he called for abolishing Article 9, saying if Japan were to become a: "respectable member (of) the community of nations it would first have to revise its constitution and rearm: If Japan is alone in renouncing war ... she will not be able to prevent others from invading her land. If, on the other hand, Japan could defend herself, there would be no further need of keeping United States garrison forces in Japan. ... Japan should be strong enough to defend herself."

In May 2007, the then Prime Minister of Japan Shinzo Abe (Nobusuke Kishi's grandson) marked the 60th anniversary of the Japanese Constitution by calling for a "bold review" of the document to allow the country to take a larger role in global security and foster a revival of national pride. Aside from Abe's Liberal Democratic Party, as of 2012, the Japan Restoration Party, Democratic Party of Japan, People's New Party, and Your Party support a constitutional amendment to reduce or abolish restrictions imposed by Article 9.

On 7 September 2018, candidate in the 2018 LDP Leadership Election, Shigeru Ishiba criticized Shinzo Abe for shifting his stance on Article 9 revision. Ishiba advocates the removal of Paragraph 2 of Article 9 which denies Japan's "right of belligerency". This is based on a LDP draft of changes for the law in 2012. In May 2017, Abe changed his stance to keep both the first and second paragraph of article 9 while adding a reference to the Japan Self-Defense Forces.

In January 2019, then-Prime Minister Shinzo Abe said in the National Diet that long-range cruise missiles are not banned under Article 9 of the Constitution.

On 21 October 2019 a senior U.S. military officer in Tokyo said that "Japan's avoidance of offensive weaponry under its constitution is no longer acceptable." The officer stated that Japan needs to rethink its rejection of offensive weapons and that the government should discuss it with the public. The officer said that the government of Japan should inform the public about the threats of China and North Korea.

A constitutional amendment would require a two-thirds majority and pass referendum to effect it (as per Article 96 of the Japanese Constitution). Despite numerous attempts by the LDP to change Article 9, they have never been able to achieve the large majority required, as revision is opposed by a number of Japanese political parties, including the DPJ and the Japanese Communist Party.

== See also ==
- 2015 Japanese military legislation
- Article 12 of the Constitution of Costa Rica
- Proposed Japanese constitutional referendum
- Constitution Memorial Day
- Golden Week
- Japanese arms-export ban
- Japan and the United Nations
- Japan and weapons of mass destruction
  - Japanese nuclear weapons program
- Japan Self-Defense Forces
- Japanese Iraq Reconstruction and Support Group
- Japanese Peace Bell
- Japanese people who conserve Article 9
- Kellogg–Briand Pact
- Perpetual peace
- Reform of the United Nations Security Council#Japan
- SEALDs
- The Nobel Peace Prize for Article 9 of the Japanese Constitution
