= Premiership of Shinzo Abe =

Premiership of Shinzo Abe may refer to:

- First premiership of Shinzo Abe
- Second premiership of Shinzo Abe
