= Second premiership of Shinzo Abe =

Japanese government from 2012 to 2020

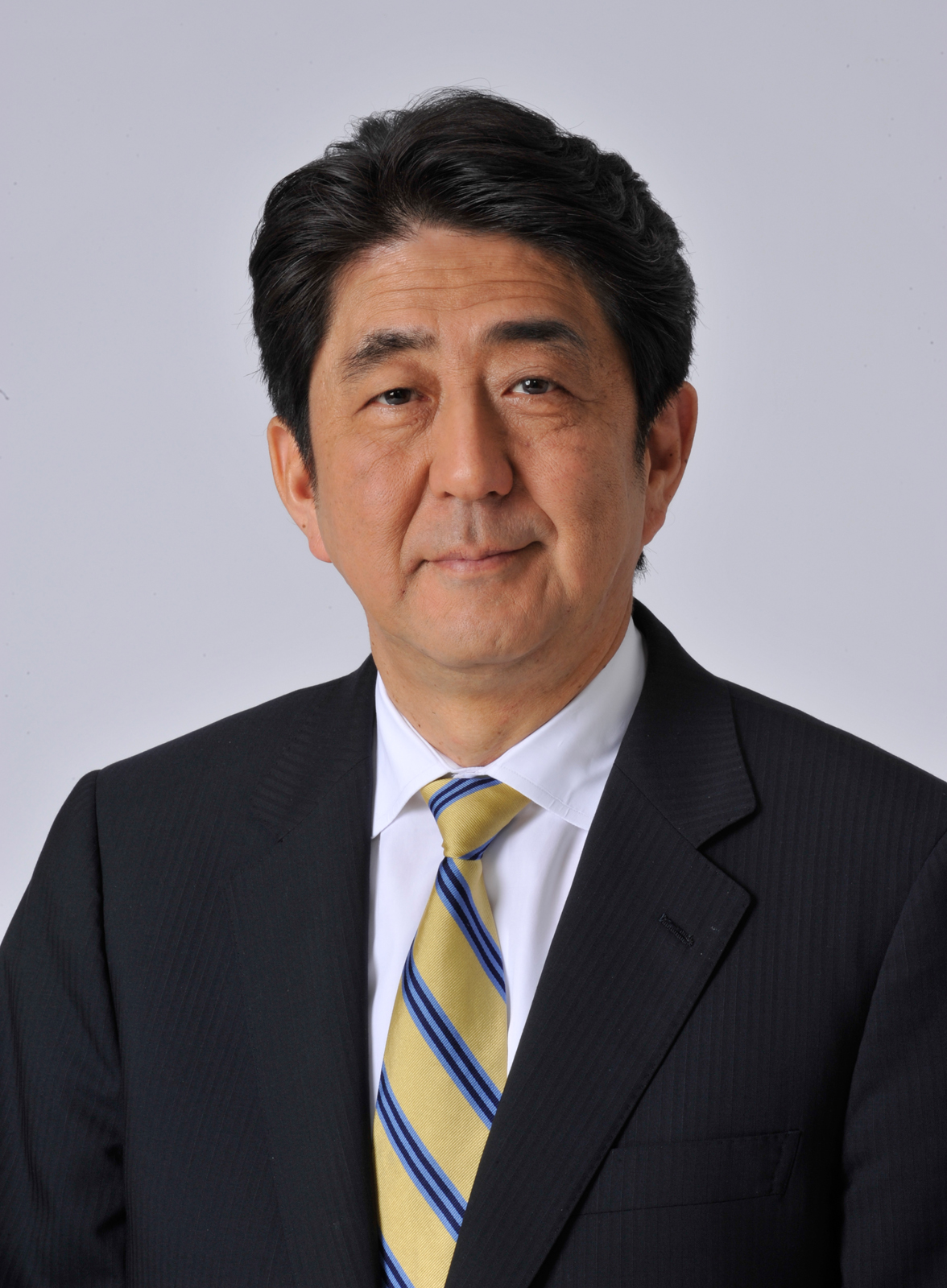
- Official portrait, 2012
- Second premiership of Shinzo Abe; 26 December 2012 – 16 September 2020
- Monarchs: Akihito; Naruhito
- Cabinet: Second Abe cabinet; Third Abe cabinet; Fourth Abe cabinet
- Party: Liberal Democratic
- Election: 2012; 2014; 2017
- Seat: Naikaku Sōri Daijin Kantei
- Constituency: Yamaguchi 4th
- Emblem of the Government of Japan

Shinzo Abe's second tenure as prime minister of Japan began on 26 December 2012 when he was officially appointed prime minister by Emperor Akihito in a ceremony at the Tokyo Imperial Palace, succeeding Yoshihiko Noda of the Democratic Party of Japan. This was Abe's second tenure as prime minister, following his first premiership from 2006 to 2007.

Following the resignation of Liberal Democratic Party president Sadakazu Tanigaki, Abe was re-elected as president of the party on 26 September 2012. Abe subsequently led the LDP to a landslide victory in the 2012 general election, ending four years of Democratic Party governance. Abe attempted to counter Japan's economic stagnation with "Abenomics", targeting escaping deflation. He led the LDP to a victory in the 2013 upper house election. He oversaw reforms to strengthen the authority of the prime minister, including the creation of a National Security Council, as well as the passage of a State Secrecy Law. He called a snap election in 2014, which he billed as a referendum on his economic policy; the LDP retained its majority in the election. In 2015, he passed the Legislation for Peace and Security which allowed deployment of the Japan Self-Defense Forces overseas in certain strict conditions, which was controversial and met with protests. He was credited with reinstating the Trans-Pacific Partnership with a new agreement in 2018. Abe led the LDP to a victory in the 2017 election, becoming Japan's longest-serving prime minister.

In foreign policy, Abe pursued strengthening Japan's alliance with the United States. He also saw closer ties with India and Australia, though relations with South Korea suffered under his tenure, especially after the start of the Japan–South Korea trade dispute in 2019. Abe took a strong stance against North Korea, especially regarding the country's abductions of Japanese citizens. Though initially facing deteriorating ties with China, relations between the two countries improved during the later parts of Abe's tenure. In 2020, Abe oversaw Japan's response to the COVID-19 pandemic. In August 2020, he again resigned, citing a relapse of his illness, and was succeeded by Yoshihide Suga.

== Background ==
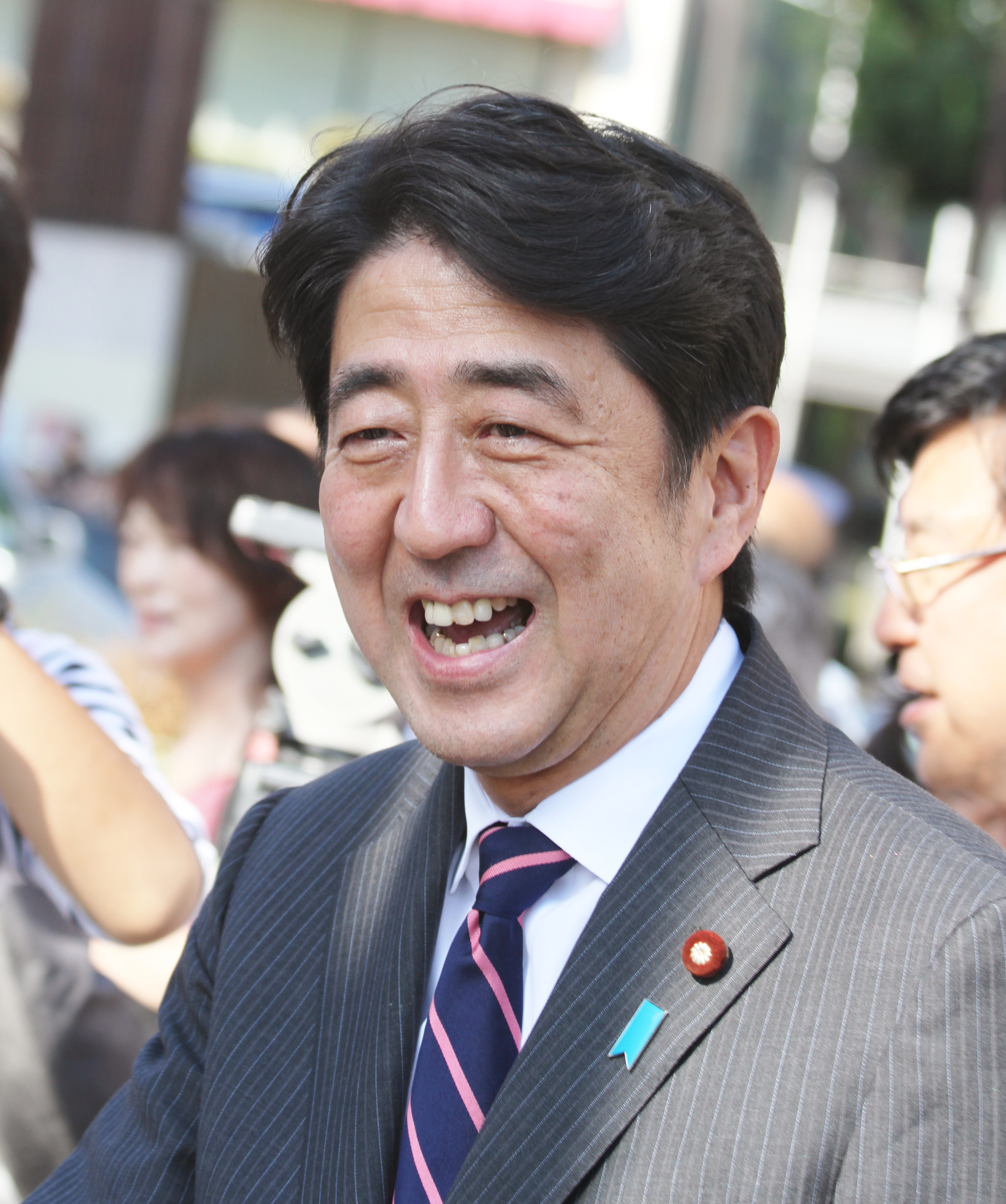
Abe (pictured campaigning in 2012) briefly served as opposition leader.

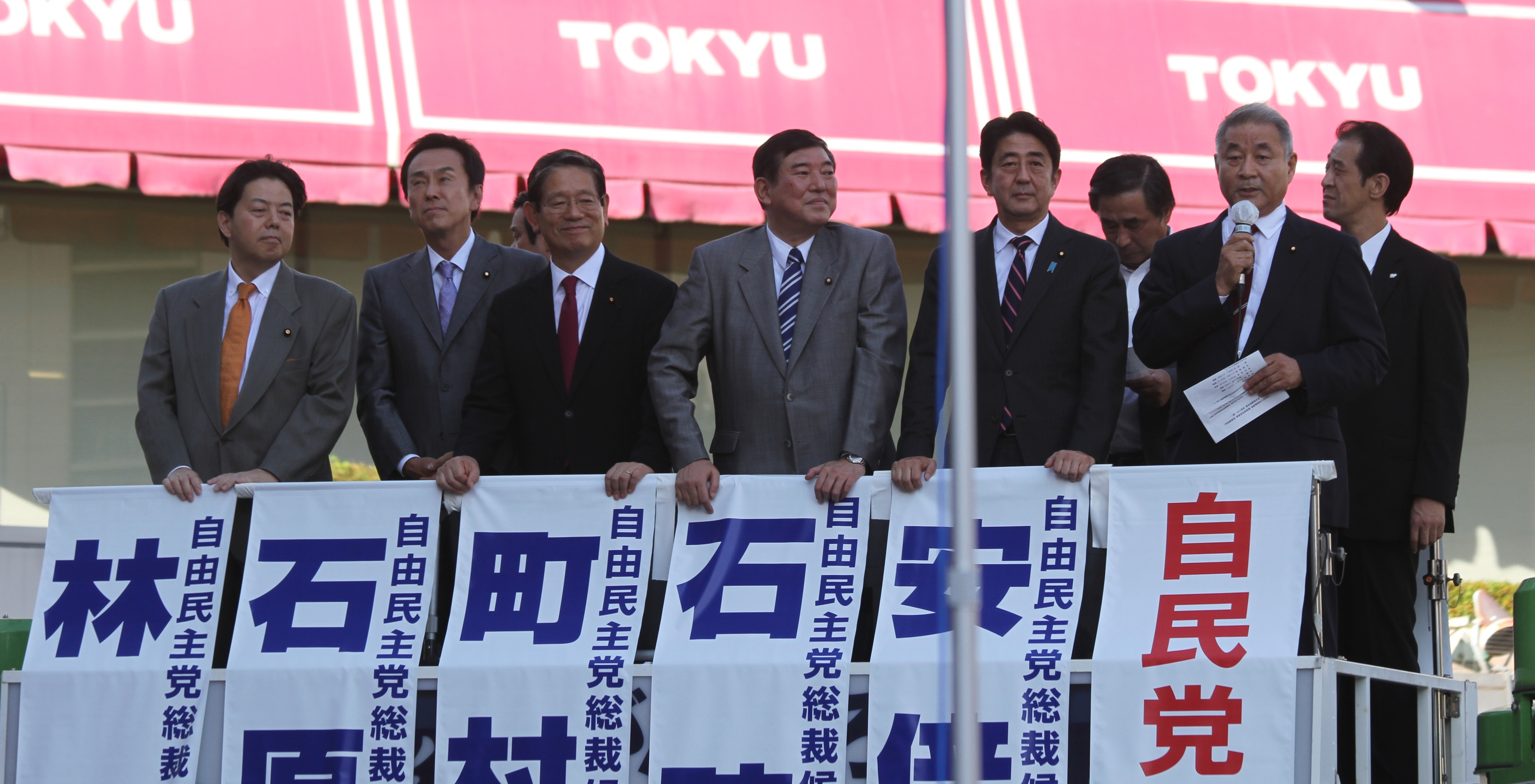
Abe and other candidates campaigning during the LDP presidential election in 2012. His chief rival, Shigeru Ishiba, is standing immediately to his right.

Following the resignation of Liberal Democratic Party president Sadakazu Tanigaki, Abe was re-elected as president of the party on 26 September 2012, coming in second out of five candidates in the first round of voting, but defeating former Defense Minister Shigeru Ishiba in a runoff vote by 108 votes to 89.

Abe returned to the LDP leadership at a time of political turmoil, as the governing DPJ had lost its majority in the lower house due to party splits over nuclear policies and the cabinet's move to raise the consumption tax from 5 to 10 percent. Prime Minister Yoshihiko Noda was forced to rely on the LDP to pass the consumption tax bill and in return was pressured by Abe and the opposition parties to hold a snap general election. Noda agreed to this on the conditions that the LDP passed a bond-financing bill and would support a commission to reform the social security system and address electoral malapportionment in the next diet session.

On 16 November 2012, Prime Minister Noda announced the dissolution of the lower house and that the general election would be held on 16 December. Abe campaigned using the slogan "Nippon o Torimodosu" ("Take back Japan"), promising economic revival through monetary easing, higher public spending and the continued use of nuclear energy, and a tough line in territorial disputes. In the elections on 16 December 2012, the LDP won 294 seats in the 480-seat House of Representatives. Together with the New Komeito Party (which partnered with the LDP since the late 1990s), Abe was able to form a coalition government that controlled a two-thirds majority in the lower house, allowing it to override the upper house's veto.

== Second Cabinet (2012–2014) ==
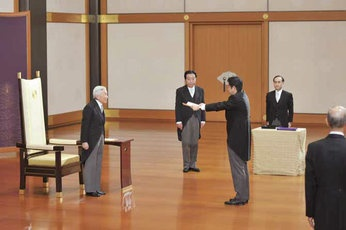
Emperor Akihito formally appoints Abe to office as prime minister, 2012

On 26 December 2012, Abe was formally elected as prime minister by the Diet, with the support of 328 out of 480 members of the House of Representatives. He and his second cabinet, which he called a "crisis-busting cabinet", were sworn in later that day. The new government included LDP heavyweights such as former prime minister Tarō Asō as deputy prime minister and finance minister, Yoshihide Suga as chief cabinet secretary and Akira Amari as economy minister. Following his victory, Abe said, "With the strength of my entire cabinet, I will implement bold monetary policy, flexible fiscal policy and a growth strategy that encourages private investment, and with these three policy pillars, achieve results."

In February 2013, Abe gave an address at the Centre for Strategic and International Studies in Washington, D.C., in which he explained his economic and diplomatic objectives, and that he had returned to the prime ministership to prevent Japan becoming a "Tier Two Nation", declaring that "Japan is back".

=== Economic policy ===
The Second Abe cabinet revived the Council on Economic and Fiscal Policy (CEFP) that had played a key role in formulating economic policy during the Koizumi cabinet, but had been abandoned by the 2009–2012 DPJ administrations.

Abe declared in his January 2013 policy speech to the Diet that economic revival and escaping deflation was "the greatest and urgent issue" facing Japan. His economic strategy, referred to as Abenomics, consisted of the so-called "three arrows" (an allusion to an old Japanese story) of policy. The first arrow was monetary expansion aimed at achieving a 2% inflation target, the second a flexible fiscal policy to act as an economic stimulus in the short term, then achieve a budget surplus, and the third a growth strategy focusing on structural reform and private sector investment to achieve long-term growth.

In 2019, it was reported that 40% of key economic statistics collected from 2005 to 2017 contained errors, casting doubt on the effectiveness of Abe's economic program and the reliability of Japanese economic statistics. It was discovered that the labor ministry did not follow protocol by only surveying about one-third of all the large Japanese businesses it was supposed to survey. The data was eventually corrected, and it was discovered that the faulty data presented Japanese economic statistics more favorably than the corrected data. The faulty data cost 19.7 million people about 53.7 billion yen in unpaid benefits, and cost the Japanese government 650 million yen to correct the error. Opposition politicians criticized the governments response; one lawmaker called Abe's economic program a fraud, with many journalists labeling the event as a data scandal.

==== "First Arrow": Monetary policy ====
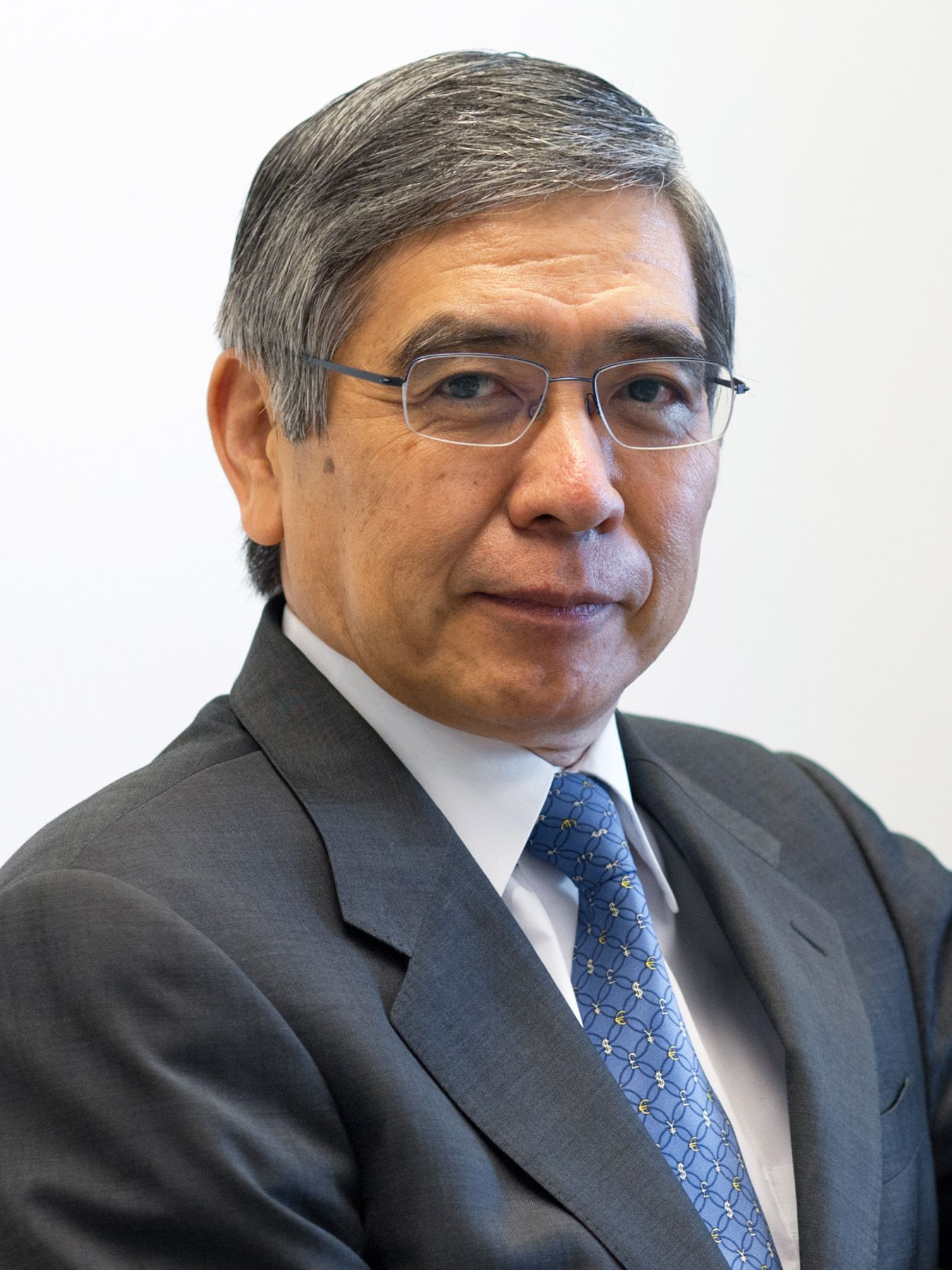
Haruhiko Kuroda, whom Abe appointed as Governor of the Bank of Japan (BOJ) in spring 2013, implemented the "first arrow" monetary policy.

At the first CEFP meeting in January 2013, Abe declared that the Bank of Japan should follow a policy of monetary easing to achieve a target of 2 percent inflation. Abe maintained pressure on the bank's governor, Masaaki Shirakawa, who was reluctant to set specific targets, into agreeing to the policy. In February, after Abe publicly speculated that the government could legislate to strip the bank of independence, Shirakawa announced he was leaving office prematurely before his term expired. Abe then appointed Haruhiko Kuroda as governor, who had previously advocated inflation targets, and who has pursued the government's policies of monetary easing.

After the first meeting of the bank's monetary policy committee after he had taken office in April, Kuroda announced an aggressive program of easing intended to double the money supply and achieve the 2 percent inflation target at "the earliest possible time". Over the first six months of the second Abe Cabinet, the Yen fell from a high of ¥77 to the dollar to ¥101.8, and the Nikkei 225 rose by 70 percent.

In a surprise move in October 2014, Kuroda announced that the BOJ would boost the monetary easing program and accelerate asset purchases, the monetary policy committee split by five votes to four but supported the policy. This was interpreted as a response to disappointing economic figures in the aftermath of the increase in the consumption tax to 8 percent, inflation has fallen to 1 percent from its peak of 1.5 percent in April.

==== "Second Arrow": Fiscal policy ====
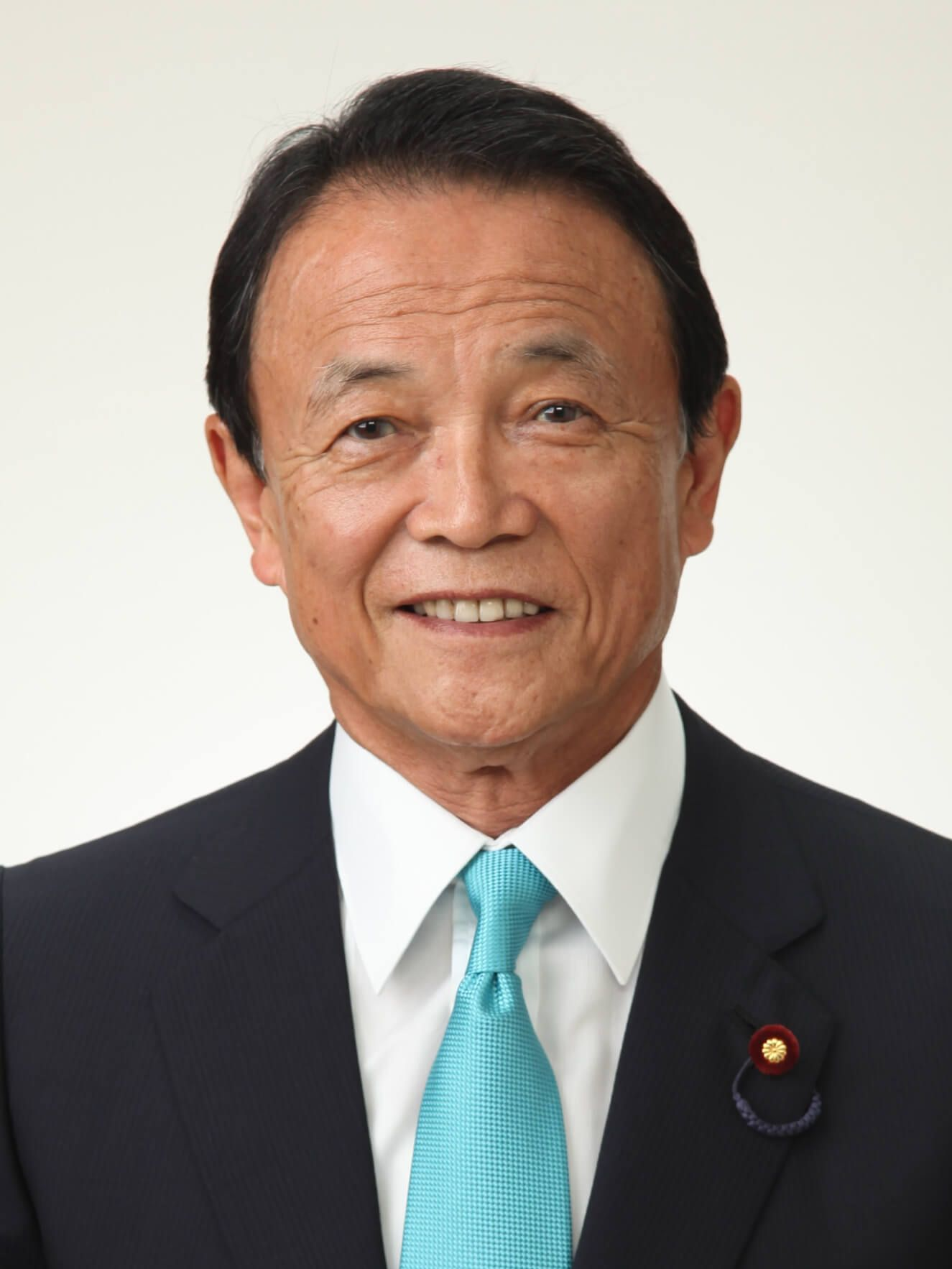
Abe's Minister of Finance Tarō Asō, who also served as deputy prime minister

The Abe Cabinet's first budget included a 10.3 trillion yen stimulus package, composed of public works spending, aid for small businesses and investment incentives, that aimed to increase growth by 2 percent. The budget also increased defense spending and manpower while reducing foreign aid.

In Autumn 2013, Abe decided to proceed with the first stage of the increase in the consumption tax from 5 to 8 percent in April 2014 (with a second stage envisaged raising it to 10 percent in October 2015). The bill to raise the tax had been passed under the previous DPJ government, but the final decision lay with the prime minister. He and Finance Minister Tarō Asō explained that the tax would be increased to provide a "sustainable" basis for future social spending and to avoid the need to finance future stimulus by issuing government bonds. While this was expected to affect economic growth in the quarter following the rise, Abe also announced a 5-trillion yen stimulus package that aimed to mitigate any effects on economic revival. After the increase in April, Japan fell into recession during the second and third quarters of 2014, leading to Abe delaying the second stage of the tax rise until April 2017 and calling a snap election. In response to the recession, Aso announced that the government would ask the Diet to pass a supplementary budget to fund a further stimulus package worth 2–3 trillion yen.

There had been some division within the Abe cabinet between "fiscal hawks", such as Finance Minister Aso, who favored fiscal consolidation through spending cuts and tax increases, and deflationists, such as Abe himself, who argued in favor of a "growth first" policy that prioritizes economic expansion and recovery over budget considerations using the slogan "no fiscal health without economic revitalization". Abe's decision to delay the consumption tax increase in November 2014 and his push for a large fiscal deficit in the 2015 budget without social security cuts was interpreted as a victory for this faction within the LDP. The government did, however, commit to a primary surplus by 2020, and pledged to review its strategy in 2018 if the primary deficit had not fallen to 1 percent of GDP by that time.

==== "Third Arrow": Growth strategy and structural reform ====
On 15 March 2013, Abe announced that Japan was entering negotiations to join the Trans-Pacific Partnership (TPP). This was interpreted by analysts as a means through which the government could enact reforms to liberalize certain sectors of the Japanese economy, most notably agriculture, and was criticized by farm lobbies and some sections of the LDP. Economist Yoshizaki Tatsuhiko described the TPP as having the potential to act as the "linchpin of Abe's economic revitalization strategy" by making Japan more competitive through free trade. In February 2015, the Abe government struck a deal to limit the power of the JA-Zenchu body to supervise and audit Japan's agricultural co-operatives, in a move designed to facilitate TPP negotiations, improve the competitiveness of Japan's farming sector and curtail the influence of the agriculture lobby.

Abe revealed the first measures related to the "third arrow" policies in June 2013, which included plans to establish deregulated economic zones and allow the sale of drugs online, but did not include substantial measures related to the labor market or business reform. These measures were less well-received than the first two arrows had been since Abe took office, with the stock market falling slightly and critics arguing that they lacked detail; The Economist, for example, judged the announcement a "misfire". Analysts did note, however, that Abe was waiting until after the July Upper House elections to reveal further details, to avoid an adverse reaction by voters to potentially unpopular reforms. At the annual meeting of the World Economic Forum (WEF) in Davos in 2014, Abe announced that he was ready to act as a "drill bit" to break through the rock of vested interests and "red tape" to achieve structural reforms of the economy. He cited reforms in agriculture, energy and health sectors as evidence of this, and pledged to push forward with the TPP, a Japan–EU trade deal and tax, corporate governance and planning reforms.

Abe announced a package of structural reforms in June 2014, that The Economist described as "less a single arrow than a 1,000-strong bundle" and compared favorably to the 2013 announcement. These new measures included corporate governance reform, the easing of restrictions on hiring foreign staff in special economic zones, liberalizing the health sector, and measures to help foreign and local entrepreneurs. The plans also included a cut in corporation tax to below 30 percent, an expansion of childcare to encourage women to join the workforce, and the loosening of restrictions on overtime. In December 2015, the government announced corporation tax would be reduced to 29.97 percent in 2016, bringing the cut forward one year ahead of schedule.

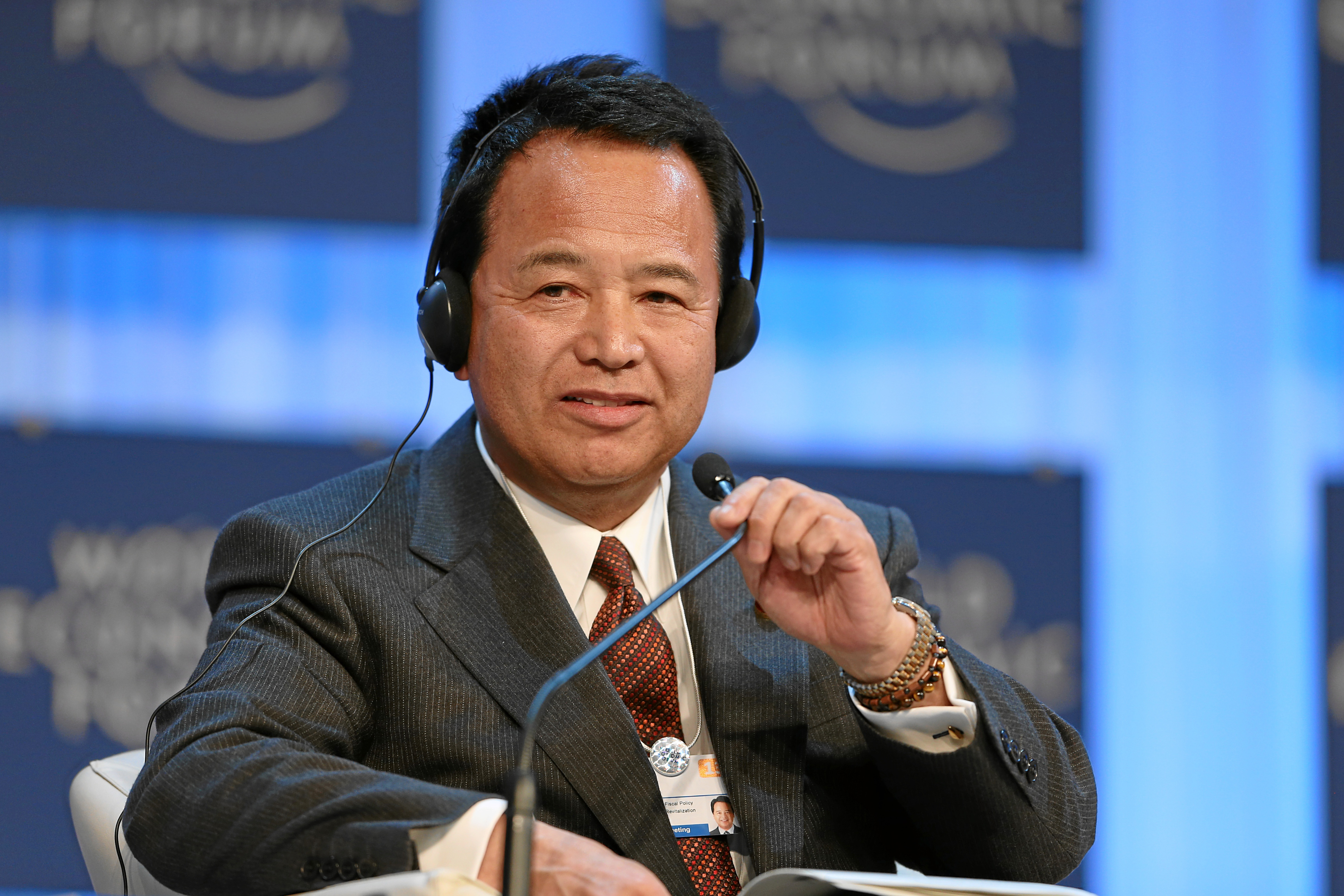
Akira Amari, who served as Abe's economy minister from 2012 to 2016, oversaw the "third arrow" growth strategy and negotiations to join the Trans-Pacific Partnership agreement.

In September 2013, Abe called for a "society in which all women can shine", setting a target that 30 percent of leadership positions should be held by women by 2020. Abe cited the "womenomics" ideas of Kathy Matsui that greater participation by women in the workforce, which is relatively low in Japan, especially in leadership roles, could improve Japan's GDP and potentially fertility rates, despite declining population figures. The Abe cabinet introduced measures to expand childcare and legislation to force public and private organizations to publish data on the number of women they employ and what positions they hold.

In November 2013, the Abe cabinet passed a bill to liberalize Japan's electricity market by abolishing price controls, breaking up regional monopolies, and separating power transmission from generation by creating a national grid company. This move was partly in response to the 2011 Fukushima disaster, and the bill faced little opposition in the Diet. By March 2015, more than 500 companies had applied to the Economy Ministry to enter the electricity retail market and the electricity industry was expected to be fully liberalized by 2016, with gas utilities expected to follow suit by 2017. Abe had also said he favored the rebuilding of Japan's nuclear reactors following the Fukushima disaster (though much of the authority to restart nuclear plants lies with local governments) and planned to strengthen relations with the United States.

In 2013, the Eurekahedge Japan Hedge Fund Index posted a record 28-percent return, which was credited to the unprecedented actions of the Abe government. In July 2015, the IMF reported that, while the structural reforms had "modestly" improved growth prospects, "further high-impact structural reforms are needed to lift growth" and prevent over-reliance on yen depreciation.

=== 2013 Upper House election ===
When Abe returned to office, although neither party had controlled the House of Councillors (the upper house of the Diet) since the 2007 election, the opposition DPJ was the largest party. The governing coalition enjoyed a two-thirds majority in the lower house, allowing it to override the upper house's veto, but this requires a delay of 90 days. This situation, known as the "Twisted Diet", had contributed to political gridlock and the "revolving door" of prime ministers since 2007. Abe's campaign for the 2013 election focused on themes of economic revival, asking voters to give him a stable mandate in both houses to pursue reforms, and took a more moderate tone on defense and constitutional matters.

In the 2013 upper house election, the LDP emerged as the largest party with 115 seats (a gain of 31) and the Komeito with 20 (a gain of 1), giving Abe's coalition control of both houses of the Diet, but not the two-thirds majority in the upper house that would allow for constitutional revision. With no national elections due until 2016, this result was described as giving Abe the opportunity of "three golden years" of parliamentary stability in which to implement his policies.

=== Domestic policy ===
Abe's return to the prime ministership saw a renewed attempt to downplay Japan's wartime atrocities in school textbooks, an issue that had contributed to his earlier downfall. In 2013, Abe supported the creation of the Top Global University Project program. This is a ten-year program to increase international student attendance in Japanese universities and hire more foreign faculty. There is also funding for selected universities to create English-only undergraduate programs. In 2014, Abe allocated millions of dollars of the fiscal budget to help programs that help single individuals in Japan find potential mates. These programs entitled "Marriage support programs" were started in hopes of raising Japan's declining birthrate, which was half of what it was six decades prior.

=== Foreign policy ===
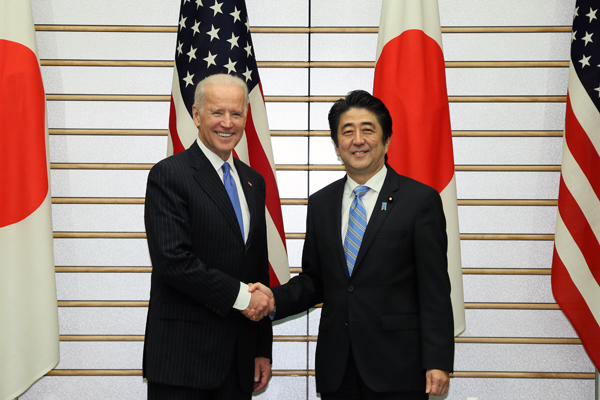
Abe with United States vice president Joe Biden in Tokyo, 2013

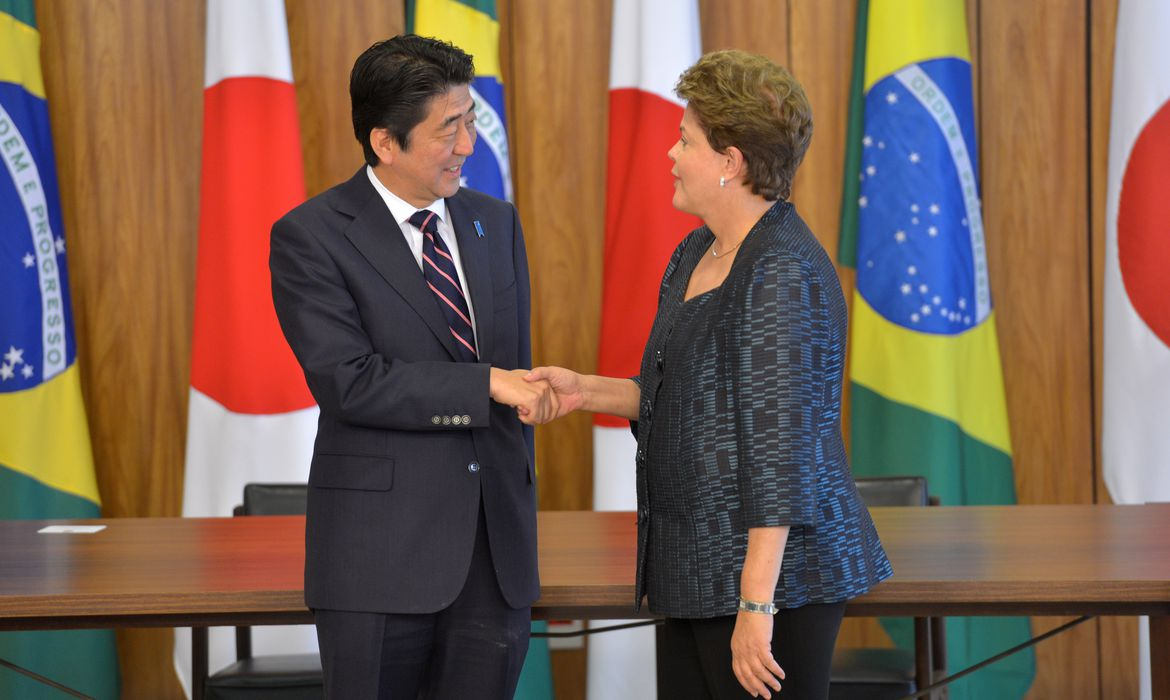
Abe with Brazilian president Dilma Rousseff in Brasília, 2014

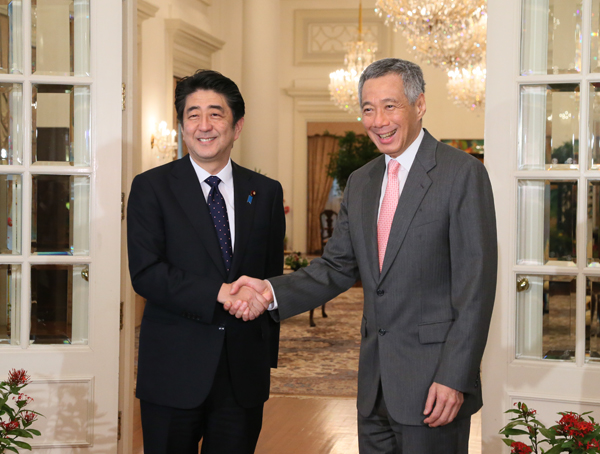
Abe with Singaporean prime minister Lee Hsien Loong at the Istana in Singapore, 2014

Shortly after taking office Abe signaled a "drastic reshaping" of foreign policy and promised to pursue diplomacy with a global, rather than a regional or bilateral outlook based on "the fundamental values of freedom, democracy, basic human rights, and the rule of law". His choice of Fumio Kishida as foreign minister was interpreted as a sign that he would pursue a more moderate line compared to his hawkish stance in the run-up to the general election. His first visit overseas after becoming prime minister once again was to various countries in Southeast Asia. Abe increased its allies in its international campaign to counter a North Korean nuclear threat. Abe often visited countries such as Singapore, Japan's largest Asian investor and vice-versa.

Within weeks of returning to power, the Second Abe cabinet faced the In Amenas hostage crisis of 2013 in which 10 Japanese citizens were killed. Abe condemned the killings as "absolutely unforgivable" and confirmed that Japan and Britain had co-operated over the incident. Abe believed that this incident demonstrated the need for the creation of a Japanese National Security Council, and convened a panel to consider its creation soon after the crisis.

Abe was unusually active in the field of foreign affairs for a Japanese prime minister, making visits to 49 countries between December 2012 and September 2014, a number that was described as "unprecedented" (by contrast, his immediate two predecessors Naoto Kan and Yoshihiko Noda visited a combined total of 18 countries between June 2010 and December 2012). This was interpreted as a means to offset poor relations with China and the Koreas by increasing Japan's profile on the world stage and improving bilateral ties with other countries in the region. Southeast Asian nations, Australia, and India were significant and frequent destinations for Abe, who visited all 10 ASEAN countries in his first year in office. The diplomatic tours also functioned as another element of Abenomics by promoting Japan to the international business community and opening up avenues for trade, energy, and defense procurement deals (for example, business executives often travel with Abe on these visits).

In September 2013, Abe intervened to aid Tokyo's bid to host the 2020 Summer Olympic and Paralympic Games, giving a speech in English at the IOC session in Buenos Aires, in which he extolled the role of sport in Japan and sought to reassure the committee that any ongoing issues with the Fukushima plant were under control. After the bid was successful, Abe sought to portray the games as symbolic of his Abenomics economic revitalization programme, saying, "I want to make the Olympics a trigger for sweeping away 15 years of deflation and economic decline." In 2014 he said that he hoped a "robot olympics" would be held at the same time, to promote the robotics industry.

Abe's foreign policy moved Japan away from its traditional focus on the "big three" bilateral relationships with the United States, China, and South Korea, and sought to increase Japan's international profile by expanding ties with NATO, the European Union, and other organizations beyond the Asia-Pacific region. In 2014, Abe and British prime minister David Cameron agreed to establish a "2 + 2 framework" of annual consultations between the British and Japanese foreign and defense ministries, with Abe calling for greater co-operation on issues "from peace of the seas to the security of the skies, space and cyberspace". This followed a similar agreement with French ministers in Tokyo earlier in the year. In fact, this followed the Herman Kahn lecture of 25 September 2013 in which he outlined his foreign policy for the next several years; in fact he was the first non-American to receive this award. In it he championed "the Indo-Pacific century" based on "freedom, democracy, human rights and the rules-based order with the TPP as its backbone". He planned at this time to reshape the interpretation of the constitution away from the narrowness that would see the JSDF handcuffed and unable to help allies in time of need. The new National Security Council of Japan was born in this speech, during which Abe observed that its neighbor had increased its own military budget by at least 10% per annum for more than 20 years. Abe stated that because Japan was one of the most mature democracies he thought it only natural that Japan help ensure the welfare and security of the world, and found it right that his "beloved country [be] a proactive contributor to peace".

Abe concluded the Japan–Australia Economic Partnership Agreement with Australia's Abbott government in 2014 and addressed a joint sitting of the Australian Parliament in July. In heralding the agreement, he also offered condolences for the suffering of Australians during World War II – singling out the Kokoda Track campaign and Sandakan Death Marches. He was the first Japanese PM to address the Australian parliament.

In January 2014, Abe became the first Japanese leader to attend India's Republic Day Parade in Delhi as chief guest, during a three-day visit where he and Prime Minister Manmohan Singh agreed to increase co-operation over economic, defense and security issues and signed trade agreements related to energy, tourism and telecoms. A close relationship was anticipated between Abe and Narendra Modi after the latter's election as Prime Minister of India in May 2014, when it was noted that they had established ties from at least seven years previously when Modi was still Chief Minister of Gujarat and that Modi was one of three people Abe "followed" on Twitter. The two men exchanged congratulatory messages after the election. Modi made his first major foreign visit to Japan in autumn of 2014, where during the visit Abe invited Modi to become the first Indian leader to stay at the Imperial State Guest House in Kyoto. The two leaders discussed agreements on nuclear co-operation, rare-earth elements, and joint maritime exercises.

On 30 May 2014, Abe told officials from the ASEAN countries, the United States, and Australia, that Japan wanted to play a major role in maintaining regional security, a departure from the passiveness it has displayed since World War II. He offered Japan's support to other countries in resolving territorial disputes.

Relations between Japan and its immediate neighbors, China and South Korea, remained poor after Abe's return to office. While he declared that the "doors are always open on my side", no bilateral meetings between Abe and Chinese leadership took place for the first 23 months of his second term. Neither did Abe hold any meetings with President Park Geun-hye of South Korea during his 2012 to 2014 term of office. Both countries criticized Abe's visit to the Yasukuni Shrine in December 2013, with the Chinese foreign minister describing the action as moving Japan in an "extremely dangerous" direction. In addition China continued to criticize Abe's defense reform policies, warning that Japan should not abandon its post-war policy of pacifism. Abe's speech at the WEF in 2014 was interpreted as a criticism of Chinese foreign and defense policy when he said that "the dividends of growth in Asia must not be wasted on military expansion" and called for greater preservation of the freedom of the seas under the rule of law, although he did not specifically refer to any one country during his remarks.

In November 2014, Abe met General Secretary of the Chinese Communist Party Xi Jinping at the APEC meeting in Beijing for the first time since either had taken office, after a photocall that was described as "awkward" by the press. Abe later told reporters that during the meeting he suggested establishing a hotline between Tokyo and Beijing to help resolve any maritime clashes and that the "first step" had been taken to improve relations.

=== Defense and security policy ===
Abe tried to centralize security policy in the prime minister's office by creating the National Security Council to better coordinate national security policy, and by ordering the first National Security Strategy in Japan's history. Based upon the American body of the same name, the law to create the NSC was passed in November 2013 and began operating the following month when Abe appointed Shotaro Yachi as Japan's first National Security Advisor.

In December 2013, Abe announced a five-year plan of military expansion. He described this as "proactive pacificism", with the goal of making Japan a more "normal" country, able to defend itself. This was in reaction to a Chinese buildup and a decreased American influence in the region.

In the same month, the Diet passed the Abe cabinet's State Secrecy Law, which took effect in December 2014. The law expanded the scope for the government to designate what information constitutes a state secret and increased penalties for bureaucrats and journalists who leak such information to up to 10 years in prison and a 10-million-yen fine. The passage of the law proved controversial, with thousands protesting the bill in Tokyo and the cabinet's approval rating falling below 50 percent for the first time in some polls. Detractors argued that the law was ambiguous and therefore gave the government too much freedom to decide which information to classify, that it could curtail freedom of the press, and that the cabinet had rushed the legislation without including any corresponding freedom of information guarantees. Abe argued that the law was necessary and applied only in cases of national security, diplomacy, public safety and counter-terrorism, saying, "If the law prevents films from being made, or weakens freedom of the press, I'll resign." However he did concede that, in retrospect, the government should have explained the details of the bill more carefully to the public.

In July 2014, the Abe cabinet decided to reinterpret Japan's constitution to allow for the right of "Collective Self-Defense". This would allow the Self Defense Forces to come to the aid of, and defend, an ally under attack, whereas the previous interpretation of the constitution was strictly pacifist and allowed for the force to be used only in absolute self-defence. The decision was supported by the United States, which has argued for greater scope for action by Japan as a regional ally, and led to a revision of the US-Japan defense cooperation guidelines in 2015. In response the Chinese Foreign Ministry said the decision "raised doubts" about Japan's commitment to peace, and argued that the Japanese public is opposed to the concept of collective self-defense. Abe argued that the move would not lead to Japan becoming involved in "foreign wars" such as the Gulf or Iraq War, but instead would secure peace through deterrence. This led to the introduction of the 2015 security legislation to give legal effect to the cabinet's decision.

=== 2014 cabinet reshuffle ===
The cabinet inaugurated in December 2012 was the longest-serving and most stable in post-war Japanese history, lasting 617 days without a change in personnel until Abe conducted a reshuffle in September 2014, with the stated aim of promoting more women into ministerial posts. The reshuffled cabinet tied the record of five women ministers set by the first Koizumi cabinet. Most key figures, such as Deputy Prime Minister Aso and Chief Cabinet Secretary Suga, were kept in their posts although Abe moved Justice Minister Sadakazu Tanigaki out of the cabinet to become Secretary-General of the LDP. However, on 20 October two of the women promoted in the reshuffle, Justice Minister Midori Matsushima and Trade Minister Yūko Obuchi, were forced to resign in separate election finance scandals. Abe told the press, "As prime minister, I bear full responsibility for having appointed them, and I apologize deeply to the people of Japan."

=== 2014 general election ===
Abe giving a speech in front of the Gundam Cafe in Akihabara, 2014

In November 2014, while Abe was attending the APEC forum meeting in China and the G20 Summit in Australia, rumors began appearing in the press that he was planning to call a snap election in the event that he decided to delay the second stage of the consumption tax increase. It was speculated that Abe planned to do this to "reset" Diet business after it had become gridlocked due to the fallout from ministerial resignations in October, or because the political situation would be less favorable to re-election in 2015 and 2016.

On 17 November, GDP figures were released that showed Japan had fallen into recession as per the two-quarters of negative growth following the first stage of the consumption tax rise in April. Abe held a press conference on 21 November and announced that he was delaying the rise in the consumption tax by 18 months, from October 2015 to April 2017, and calling a snap general election for 14 December. Abe described the election as the "Abenomics Dissolution" and asked the voters to pass judgment on his economic policies. Abe's popularity fell slightly with the announcement and he declared that he would resign if his coalition did not win a simple majority, though analysts agreed this was highly unlikely due to the weak state of the opposition. The opposition parties attempted to field a united front in opposition to Abe's policies, but found themselves divided on them.

In the 2014 general election, the LDP won 291 seats, a loss of 3, but the Komeito gained 4 to win 35. Therefore, the governing coalition maintained its two-thirds majority in a slightly reduced lower house of 475.

== Third Cabinet (2014–2017) ==
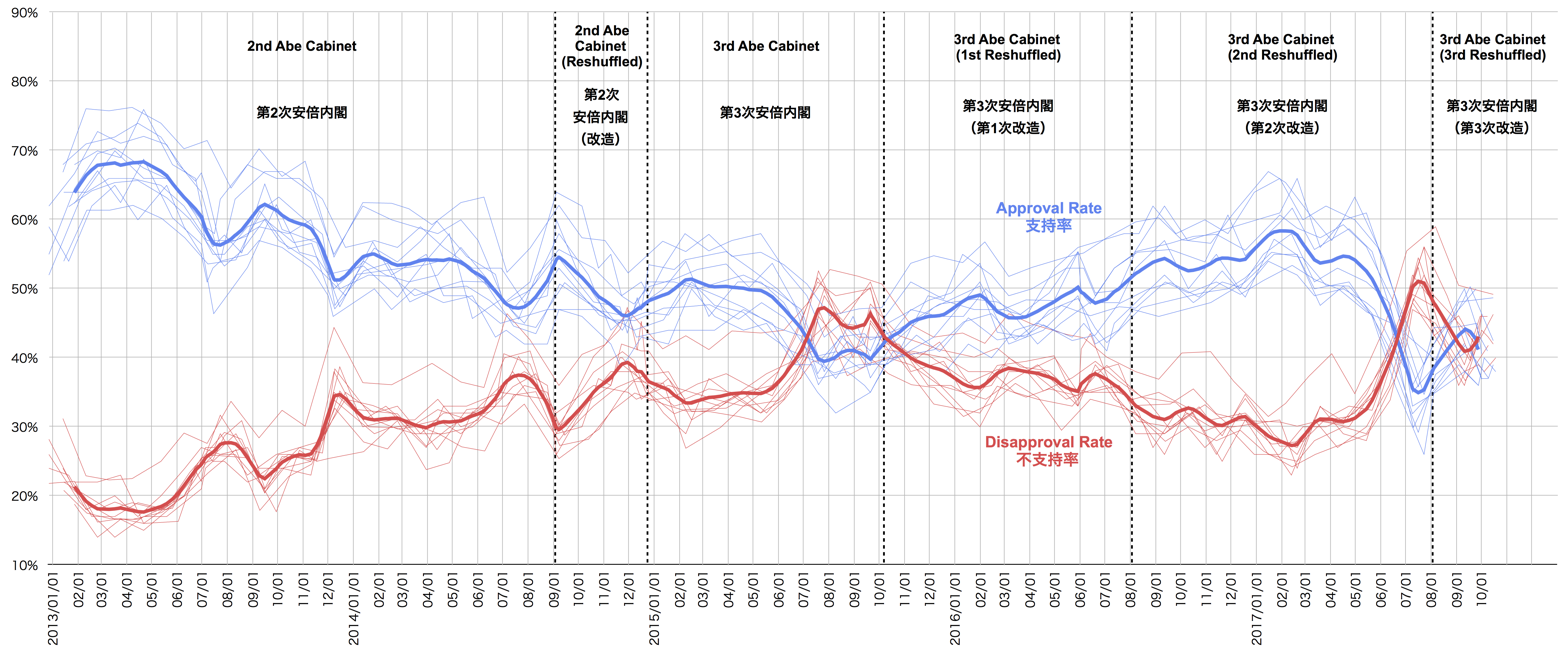
Abe Cabinet approval ratings from 2012 to 2017

On 24 December 2014, Abe was re-elected to the position of prime minister by the House of Representatives. The only change he made when introducing his third cabinet was replacing defense minister Akinori Eto, who was also involved in a political funding controversy, with Gen Nakatani. In his February policy speech, as the Cabinet weathered a Moritomo Gakuen school scandal, Abe called upon the new Diet to enact "most drastic reforms since the end of World War II" in the sectors of the economy, agriculture, healthcare and others.

=== Foreign policy ===
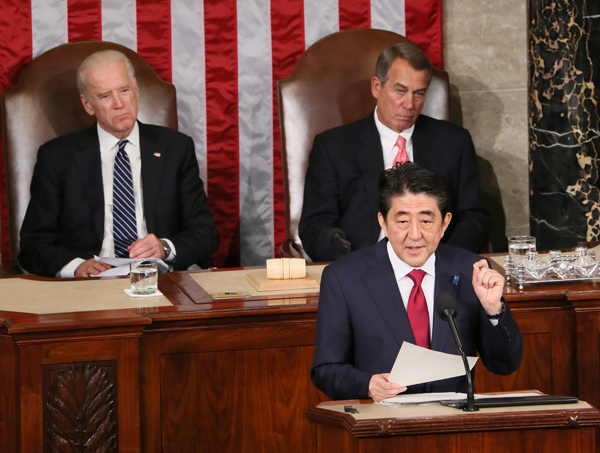
Abe addressing the United States Congress, 2015

On a tour of the Middle East in January 2015, Abe announced that Japan would provide 200 million dollars in non-military assistance to countries fighting against the Islamic State of Iraq and the Levant as part of a 2.5-billion-dollar aid package. Shortly after this, ISIL released a video in which a masked figure (identified as Mohammed Emwazi or "Jihadi John") threatened to kill two Japanese hostages, Kenji Goto and Haruna Yukawa, in retaliation for the move unless Abe's government paid 200 million dollars of ransom money. Abe cut short his trip to deal with the crisis, declared that such acts of terrorism were "unforgivable" and promised to save the hostages while refusing to pay the ransom. The Abe cabinet worked with the Jordanian government to attempt to secure the release of both hostages, after further videos were released by ISIL linking their fate to that of the pilot Muath al-Kasasbeh, with deputy foreign minister Yasuhide Nakayama conducting negotiations in Amman. Both hostages were killed with ISIL releasing news of Yukawa's death on 24 January and Goto's on 31 January. Abe condemned the killings as a "heinous act", declared that Japan would "not give in to terrorism" and pledged to work with the international community to bring the killers to justice. There was some criticism of Abe for his move to pledge aid against ISIL while they were holding Japanese citizens hostage, but polls showed support for his administration increasing in the aftermath of the crisis. He later used the example of the hostage crisis to argue the case for the collective self-defense legislation that his government introduced in the summer of 2015.

In April 2015, Abe addressed a joint session of the United States Congress, the first Japanese prime minister to do so. In his speech he referred to the Japan–US Alliance as the "Alliance of Hope", promised that Japan would play a more active security and defense role in the alliance and argued that the TPP would bring both economic and security benefits to the Asia-Pacific region. The address served as part of a state visit to the United States, the eighth of the Obama Presidency, which President Obama referred to as a "celebration of the ties of friendship" between America and Japan. During the visit, Abe attended a state dinner at the White House.

Like his predecessors Tomiichi Murayama and Junichiro Koizumi, Abe issued a statement commemorating the 70th anniversary of the end of World War II on 14 August 2015. This statement had been widely anticipated, with some commentators expecting Abe to amend or even refuse to repeat the previous leaders' apologies for Japan's role in the war. In the statement, Abe committed to upholding the previous apologies and expressed "profound grief and eternal, sincere condolences" for the "immeasurable damage and suffering" Japan had caused for "innocent people" during the conflict. He also argued that Japan should not be "predestined to apologize" forever, noting that more than eighty percent of Japanese people alive today were born after the conflict and played no part in it. The governments of both China and South Korea responded with criticism of the statement, but analysts noted that it was muted and restrained in tone, in comparison to the harsher rhetoric than had been employed previously. A representative of the US National Security Council welcomed the statement and referred to Japan as having been a "model for nations everywhere" in its record on "peace, democracy, and the rule of law" since the war's end. Professor Gerald Curtis of Columbia University argued that the statement "probably satisfies no constituency" either in Japan or abroad, but that by repeating the words "aggression", "colonialism", "apology" and "remorse" used in the Murayama Statement of 1995, it was likely to be enough to improve relations with China and Korea.

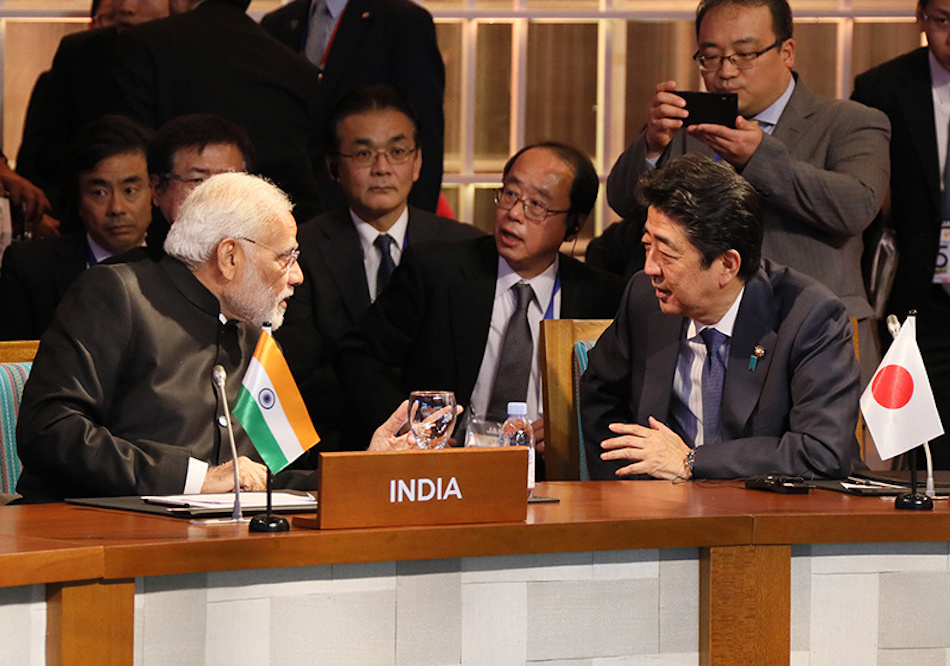
Abe with Indian prime minister Narendra Modi at the Regional Comprehensive Economic Partnership summit, 2017

In December 2015, Abe and Indian prime minister Narendra Modi signed deals in which India agreed to buy Shinkansen technology from Japan (financed in part by a loan from the Japanese government), and for Japan to be raised to full partner status in the Malabar naval exercises. Also agreed at the talks was a proposal for Japan to sell non-military nuclear technology to India, to be formally signed once technical details were finalized. Demonstrating their close relationship, Abe described Modi's policies as "like Shinkansen—high speed, safe and reliable while carrying many people along". In return, Modi complimented Abe as a "phenomenal leader", noted how India–Japan relations had a "wonderful human touch" and invited him to attend the Ganga aarti ceremony at Dashashwamedh Ghat in his Varanasi constituency. Analysts described the nuclear deal as part of Japan and India's efforts to respond to the growing power of China in the Asia-Pacific region.

In Seoul in November 2015, Abe attended the first China–Japan–South Korea trilateral summit held for three years with Korean president Park Geun-hye and Chinese premier Li Keqiang. The summits had been suspended in 2012 due to tensions over historical and territorial issues. The leaders agreed to restore the summits as annual events, negotiate a trilateral free trade agreement, and work to check North Korea's nuclear weapons programme. They also announced that trilateral co-operation had been "completely restored".

Japan's relations with South Korea improved somewhat during Abe's third term, in the aftermath of Abe's war anniversary statement. Abe and South Korea's president Park Geun-hye held their first bilateral meeting in November 2015, where they agreed to resolve the "comfort women" dispute, which Park described as the biggest obstacle to closer ties. In late December 2015, foreign ministers Fumio Kishida and Yun Byung-se announced in Seoul that a deal had been reached to resolve the comfort women dispute, in which Japan agreed to pay 1 billion yen (US$8.3 million) into a fund to support the 46 surviving victims, and issued a statement that contained Abe's "most sincere apologies and remorse". Abe later telephoned Park. In return, the South Korean government agreed to consider the matter "finally and irreversibly resolved" and work to remove a statue in front of the Japanese embassy in Seoul. Both sides agreed to refrain from criticizing each other over the issue in the future. President Park stated that the agreement would be a "new starting point" for relations between the two countries, although both leaders received some domestic criticism: Abe for issuing the apology, and Park for accepting the deal.

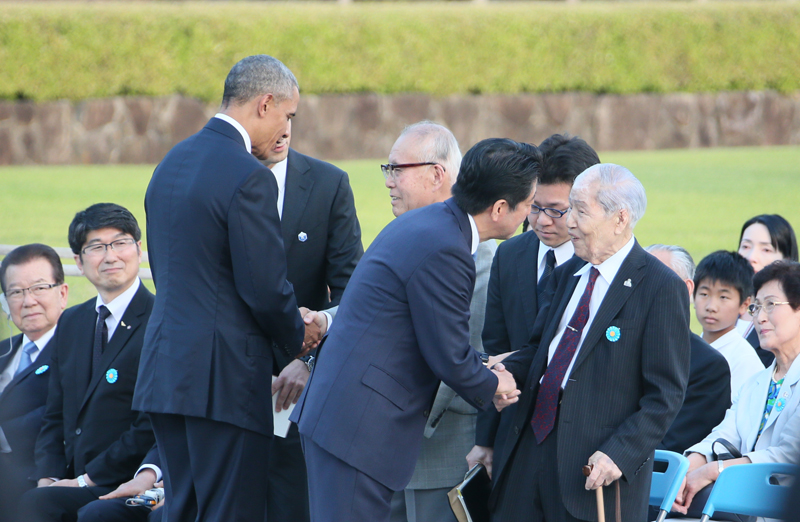
Abe with Obama at the Hiroshima Peace Memorial, 2016

On 27 May 2016, Abe accompanied Barack Obama when he became the first sitting US president to visit Hiroshima, 71 years after the US atomic bombing of the city towards the end of World War II. The two paid tribute to the victims of the bombing at the Hiroshima Peace Memorial Museum, during the visit both leaders pledged to promote nuclear disarmament. On 27 December 2016, Abe paid a reciprocal visit to USS Arizona Memorial, Honolulu. The Abe government and the Japanese public mistakenly thought Abe's visit of Honolulu was unprecedented. Abe's visit drew public attention for the first time to the three quiet visits to Honolulu by Japanese prime ministers in 1951, 1956, and 1957.

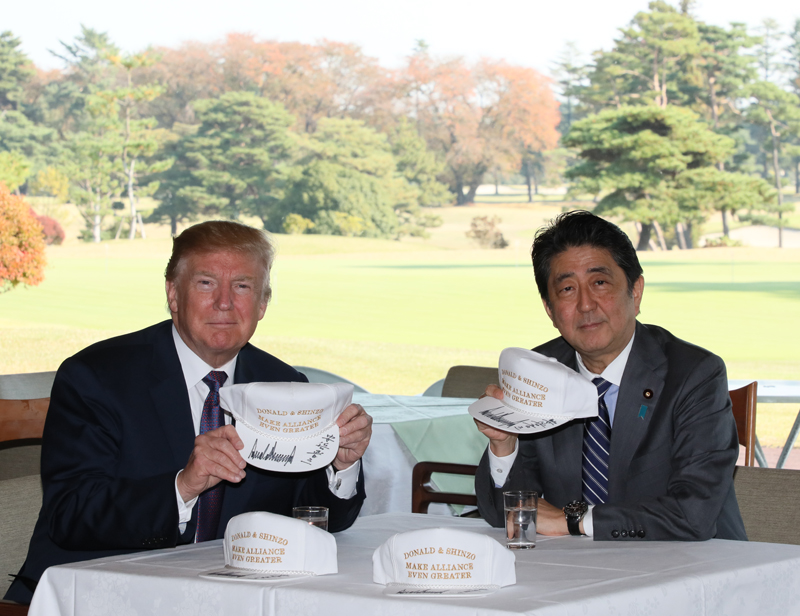
Abe and US president Donald Trump in 2017 with hats reading "Donald & Shinzo, Make Alliance Even Greater"

Shortly after Donald Trump had won the US presidential election, Abe cut short his presence at an Asia-Pacific Economic Cooperation summit being held in Lima, Peru, in order to have an informal, impromptu meeting with the then president-elect at the Trump Tower. After Trump's inauguration, they had a formal meeting at Mar-a-Lago in Palm Beach, Florida, at which they discussed security in light of a North Korean threat, with Abe stating that Japan would be more committed to Japan–United States relations. They also golfed alongside South African professional golfer Ernie Els.

=== Security and defense issues ===
In his April speech to the US Congress, Abe announced that his government would "enact all necessary bills by this coming summer" to expand the Self-Defense Forces' capacity for operations and to give effect to the cabinet's July 2014 decision to reinterpret the constitution in favor of collective self-defense. The Abe cabinet then introduced 11 bills making up the Legislation for Peace and Security into the Diet in May 2015, which pushed for a limited expansion of military powers to fight in a foreign conflict. The principal aims of the bills were to allow Japan's Self-Defense Forces to come to the aid of allied nations under attack (even if Japan itself was not) in an "existential crisis situation", to expand their scope to support international peacekeeping operations, and to allow for Japan to take on a greater share of security responsibilities as part of the US-Japan Alliance.

To allow for enough time to pass the bills in the face of lengthy opposition scrutiny, the Abe cabinet extended the Diet session by 95 days from June into September, making it the longest in the post-war era. The bills passed the House of Representatives on 16 July with the support of the majority LDP-Komeito coalition. Diet members from the opposition Democratic, Innovation, Communist, and Social Democratic parties walked out of the vote in protest at what they said was the government's move to force the bills through without sufficient debate and ignore "responsible opposition parties". Abe countered by arguing that the bills had been debated for "as many as 113 hours" before the vote. While common practice in many other parliamentary democracies, a government using its majority to "railroad" controversial bills through the Diet in the face of political and public opposition is a subject of criticism in Japan.

As a result of these moves, Abe faced a public backlash, and opinion polls showed that his approval ratings fell into negative figures for the first time since he returned to power in 2012, with 50 percent disapproving and 38 percent approving of the cabinet according to one Nikkei survey taken at the beginning of August. Many protested outside the Diet buildings, denouncing what was referred to as "war bills" by opponents. Organizers of the protests estimated that up to 100,000 protesters marched against the bills' passage of the lower house in July. During Diet committee hearings on the bills, constitutional scholars (some of whom had been invited by the ruling parties) and a former Supreme Court justice argued that the legislation was unconstitutional. Abe was publicly criticized by atomic bomb survivor Sumiteru Taniguchi in his speech at the Nagasaki memorial ceremony on 9 August, when he stated that the defense reforms would take Japan "back to the wartime period". Members of the Abe cabinet said that they would make a greater effort to explain the contents of and the reasons for the security legislation to the public, with the LDP releasing an animated cartoon commercial, and Abe appearing live on television and internet chat streams to make the case for the legislation and take questions from members of the public.

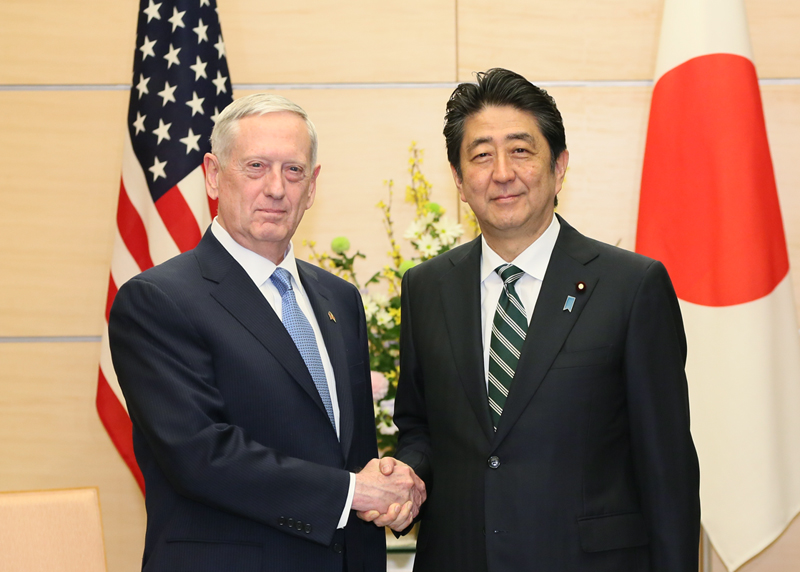
Abe with US secretary of defense Jim Mattis in 2017

The security bills were finally approved by the House of Councillors, 148 votes to 90, and became law on 19 September. This followed opposition attempts using delaying tactics as well as physical altercations, in which some Diet members attempted to stop the relevant chairman from calling the vote to move the bill out of committee and to a general vote. After the vote, Abe issued a statement saying that the new laws "will fortify our pledge to never again wage war", and that the legislation, rather than being "war bills", was instead "aimed at deterring war and contributing to peace and security". He also pledged to continue to explain the legislation to try to gain "greater understanding" from the public on the issue. Following the bills' passage, Abe was expected to once again return his focus to economic issues.

On 18 October 2015 Abe presided over the triennial fleet review of the Japan Maritime Self-Defense Force (JMSDF) in his role as Commander-in-Chief of the Self-Defense Forces. In his speech to personnel on board the destroyer Kurama, he announced that "by highly hoisting the flag of 'proactive pacifism,' I'm determined to contribute more than ever to world peace and prosperity". Later that day he went aboard the USS Ronald Reagan, becoming the first Japanese prime minister to set foot on an American warship.

In December 2015, the Abe government announced the creation of a new intelligence unit, the International Counterterrorism Intelligence Collection Unit, to aid counter-terrorism operations, to be based in the Foreign Ministry but led by the Prime Minister's Office. This was reported as being part of efforts to step up security measures in preparation for the 2016 G7 Summit in Shima, Mie, and 2020 Olympics in Tokyo. In the same month the cabinet approved Japan's largest-ever defense budget, at 5.1 trillion yen (US$45 billion), for the fiscal year beginning in April 2016. The package included funding intended for the purchase of three "Global Hawk" drones, six F-35 fighter jets, and a Boeing KC-46A midair refueling aircraft.

=== Re-election as LDP president and "Abenomics 2.0" ===
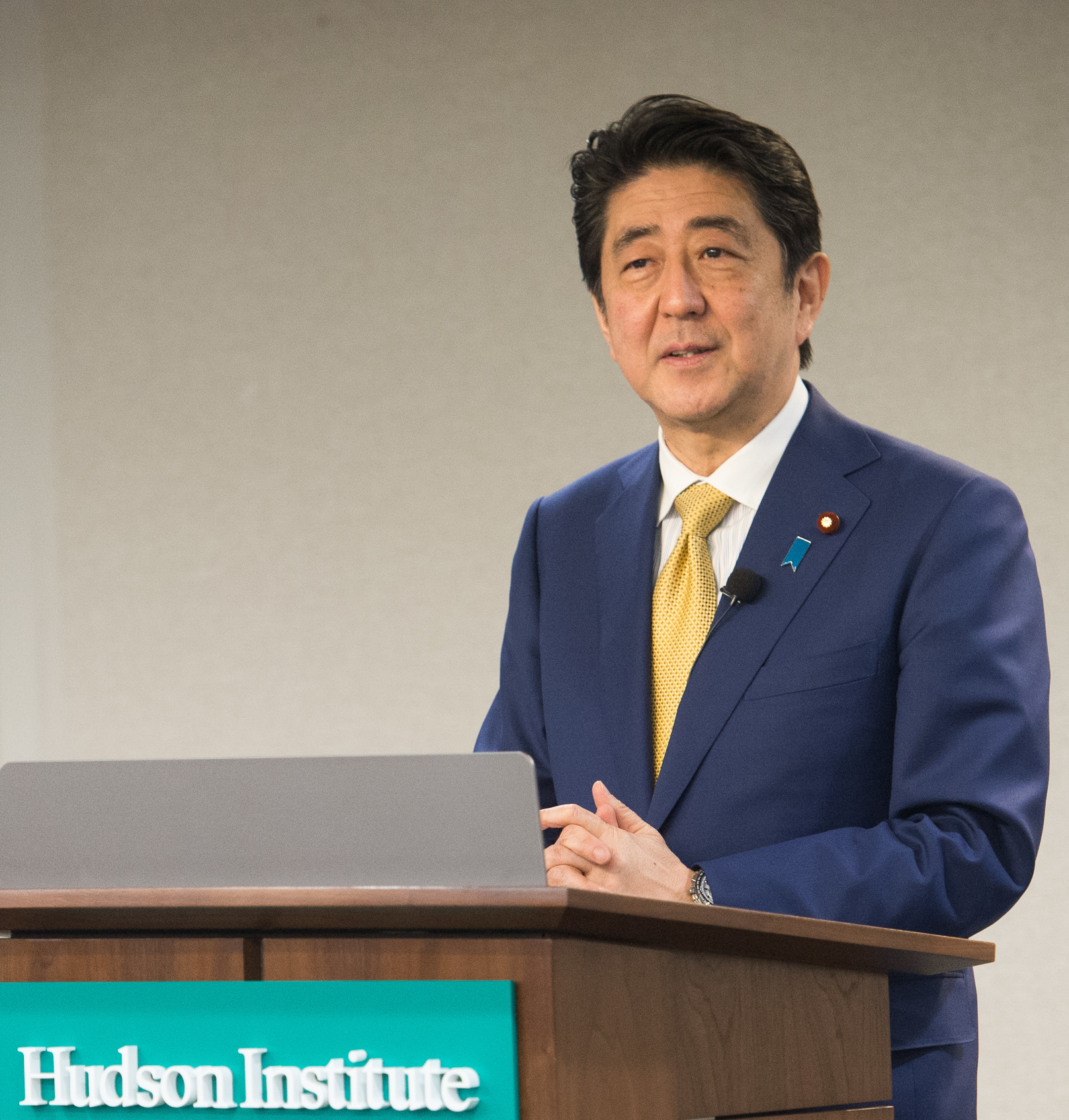
Abe speaking at the Hudson Institute in Washington, D.C., 2016

In September 2015, Abe was re-elected as president of the LDP in an uncontested election after LDP Diet member Seiko Noda failed to garner enough support to stand as a candidate. Following this Abe carried out a cabinet reshuffle, once again keeping the key ministers of Finance, Economy, Foreign Affairs, and the Chief Cabinet Secretary in post. He also created a new ministerial position for the coordination of policies related to the economy, population decline, and social security reform, which was filled by Katsunobu Katō.

At a press conference after his official re-election as LDP president, Abe announced that the next stage of his administration would focus on what he called "Abenomics 2.0", the aim of which was to tackle issues of low fertility and an aging population and create a society "in which each and every one of Japan's 100 million citizens can take on active roles". This new policy consisted of targets which Abe referred to as "three new arrows"; to boost Japan's GDP to 600 trillion yen by 2021, to raise the national fertility rate from an average of 1.4 to 1.8 children per woman and stabilize the population at 100 million, and to create a situation where people would not have to leave employment to care for elderly relatives by the mid-2020s. Abe explained that the government would take measures to increase wages, boost consumption, and expand childcare, social security and care services for the elderly to meet these goals.

This new iteration of Abenomics was met with some criticism by commentators, who argued that it was not yet clear if the first three arrows had succeeded in lifting Japan out of deflation (inflation was some way below the 2 percent target), that the new arrows were merely presented as targets without the necessary policies to meet them, and that the targets themselves were unrealistic. However, opinion polls during the final months of 2015 showed the Abe cabinet's approval ratings once again climbing into positive figures after the change in emphasis back to economic issues.

At the conclusion of the Trans-Pacific Partnership talks in early October 2015, Abe hailed the agreement for creating an "unprecedented economic zone" and opening up possibilities for an even wider Asia-Pacific free trade deal and Japanese trade with Europe. He also promised to mitigate any negative effects on the Japanese agricultural sector. GDP figures released in November 2015 initially appeared to show that Japan had entered a second recession since the implementation of Abenomics. However, these figures were subsequently revised to show that the economy had grown by 1 percent in the third quarter, thus avoiding recession.

In December 2015, the two parties making up Abe's governing coalition agreed to introduce a reduced rate of consumption tax for food when the anticipated tax increase from 8 to 10 percent takes place in April 2017. This deal was reached after Abe was seen to come down strongly in favor of the position held by his junior coalition partner, the Komeito, that the tax rate should be reduced, which prompted some disagreement from members of his party who favored a policy of greater fiscal consolidation through taxes. Abe dismissed the chairman of the LDP's tax panel Takeshi Noda (who opposed the reduction), and appointed Yoichi Miyazawa, who was more favorable to the policy, as his replacement. Abe declared the tax deal to be "the best possible result" of the negotiations.

=== Constitutional revision ===
At the 2016 election to the House of Councillors, the first that allowed Japanese citizens 18 and over to vote, Abe led the LDP–Komeito pact to victory, with the coalition being the largest in the House of Councillors since it was set at 242 seats. The election's results opened the debate on constitutional reform, particularly in amending Article 9 of Japan's pacifist constitution, with pro-revisionist parties gaining the two-thirds majority being necessary for reform, alongside a two-thirds majority in the House of Representatives, which would ultimately lead to a nationwide referendum. Abe remained relatively quiet on the issue for the remainder of the year, but in May 2017, announced that the constitutional reform would be in effect by 2020.

== Fourth Cabinet (2017–2020) ==
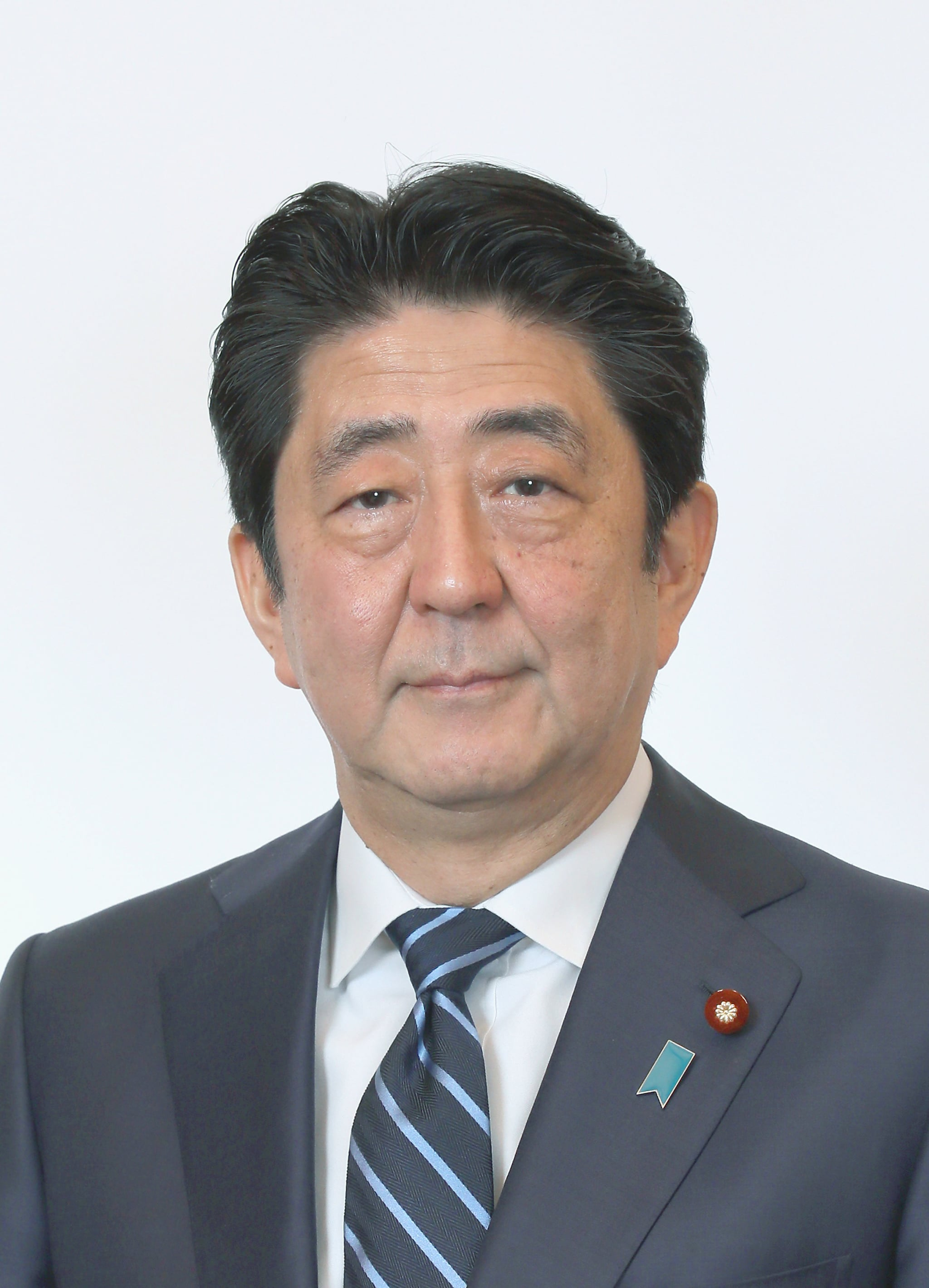
Official portrait, 2020

The 2017 general election was held on 22 October. Prime Minister Abe called the snap election on 25 September, while the North Korea crisis was prominent in the news media. Political opponents of Abe say the snap election was designed to evade questioning in parliament over alleged scandals. Abe was expected to retain a majority of seats in the Diet. Abe's ruling coalition took almost a majority of the vote and two-thirds of the seats. The last-minute campaigning and voting took place as Typhoon Lan, the biggest typhoon of 2017, was wreaking havoc on Japan.

=== Re-election as LDP president ===
On 20 September 2018, Abe was re-elected as leader of the main ruling Liberal Democratic Party. On 19 November 2019, Abe became Japan's longest-serving prime minister, surpassing the 2,883-day record of Katsura Tarō. On 24 August 2020, Abe became the longest-serving prime minister in terms of consecutive days in office, surpassing Eisaku Satō's 2,798-day record.

=== Favoritism scandals ===
In March 2018, it was revealed that the finance ministry (with finance minister Tarō Asō at its head) had falsified documents presented to the parliament in relation to the Moritomo Gakuen scandal, in order to remove 14 passages implicating Abe. It was suggested that the scandal could cost Abe his seat as Liberal Democratic party's leader. Further accusations arose the same year that Abe had given preferential treatment to his friend Kotarō Kake to open a veterinary department at his school, Kake Gakuen. Abe denied the charges, but support for his administration fell below 30% in the polls, the lowest since his taking power in 2012. Those who called for him to step down included former prime minister Junichiro Koizumi. The scandal was referred to by some as "Abegate". Former prime minister Junichiro Koizumi speculated that Abe would likely resign due to the scandal.

The scandals, while not damaging his political standing permanently, did little good for his image. In July 2018, Abe's public standing was further hit after he held a drinking party with LDP lawmakers during the peak of the floods in western Japan. In 2020, Abe came under further criticism for extending the term of top Tokyo prosecutor Hiromu Kurokawa, who later resigned amid a gambling scandal. Abe's approval rating fell from 40% to 27% during the month of May 2020, largely due to his handling of the Kurokawa situation.

=== Foreign policy ===
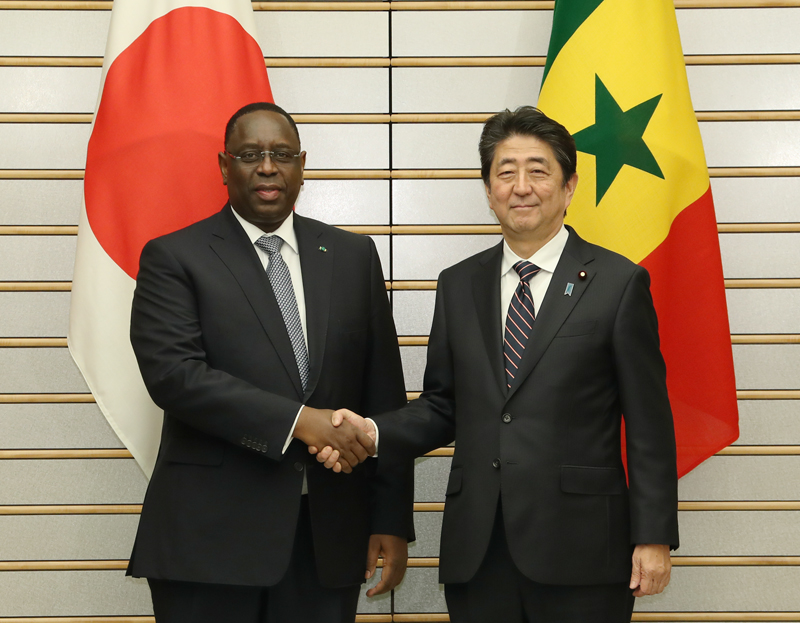
Abe with Senegalese President Macky Sall in 2017.

Abe supported the 2018 North Korea–United States summit. Shortly after the summit was announced, Abe told reporters he appreciated "North Korea's change" and attributed the diplomatic change in tone to the coordinated sanctions campaign by the United States, Japan, and South Korea. Abe, however, cautioned President Trump not to compromise on North Korea's missile program and leave Japan exposed to short-range missiles or relieve pressure on North Korea too soon before complete denuclearization. Abe also expressed a desire to hold a bilateral meeting with North Korea on the issue of abductions of Japanese citizens, pressing President Trump to raise the matter at the summit. Reports in 2019 revealed that Abe authorized covering up information about two missing people from Japan living in North Korea.

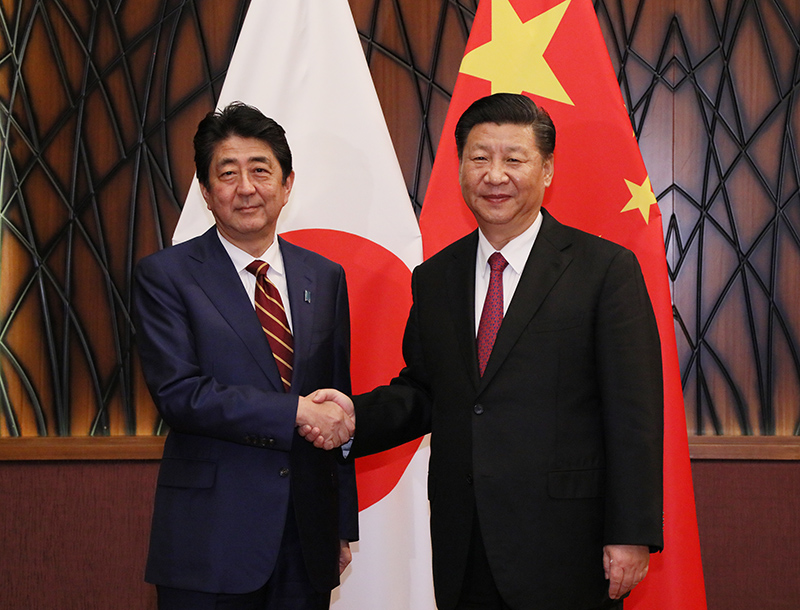
Abe with CCP General Secretary and Chinese President Xi Jinping in November 2017.

In 2018, Abe paid a 2-day formal visit to China, in the hopes of improving foreign relations, where he had several meetings with CCP General Secretary and President Xi Jinping. At this time, Abe promised that in 2019 he would ease restrictions on the eligibility for Chinese citizens to obtain Japanese visas, especially among teenagers. Abe also stated that he hoped Xi Jinping would visit Japan to cultivate better relations between the two countries. Abe cautioned Xi Jinping over protests in Hong Kong at the G20 Summit. Abe told Xi it is important for "a free and open Hong Kong to prosper under the 'one country, two systems' policy".

Regarding the territorial dispute with Russia, Abe adopted the "two plus alpha" approach, altering the previous governments' position that Habomai, Shikotan, Etorofu and Kunashiri islands be returned to Japan's sovereign. In a 2021 interview, Abe spoke about his negotiation with the Russian president Vladimir Putin in 2018, also confirming he had requested Fumio Kishida to continue with this approach, to avoid worsening Japan's relations with Russia.

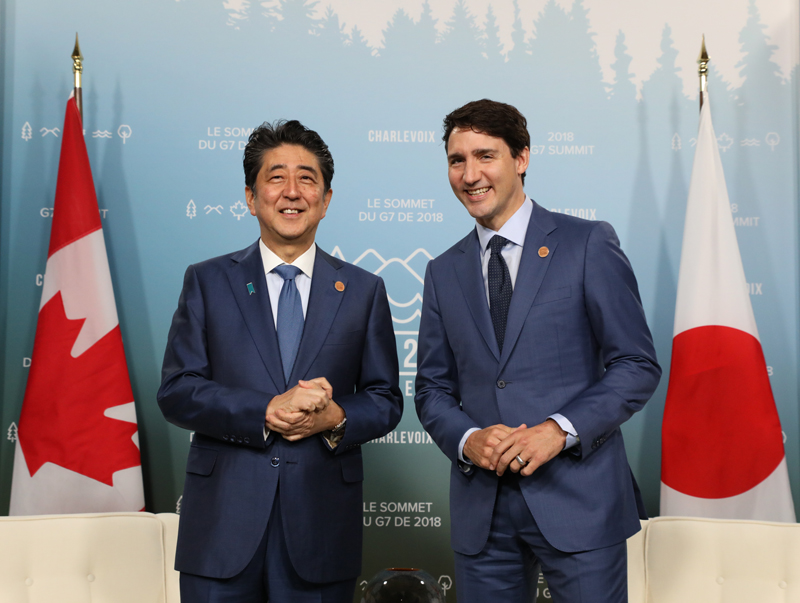
Abe with Canadian Prime Minister Justin Trudeau in June 2018

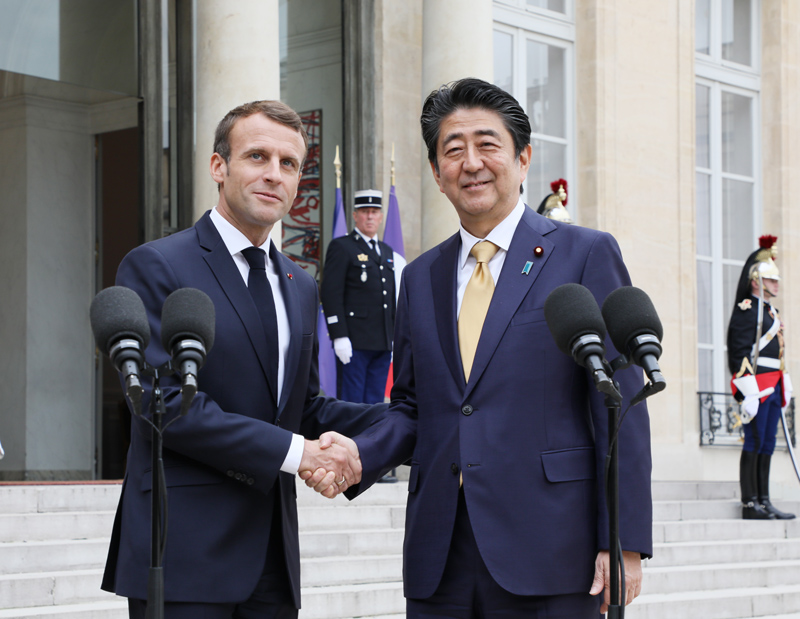
Abe with French President Emmanuel Macron in October 2018

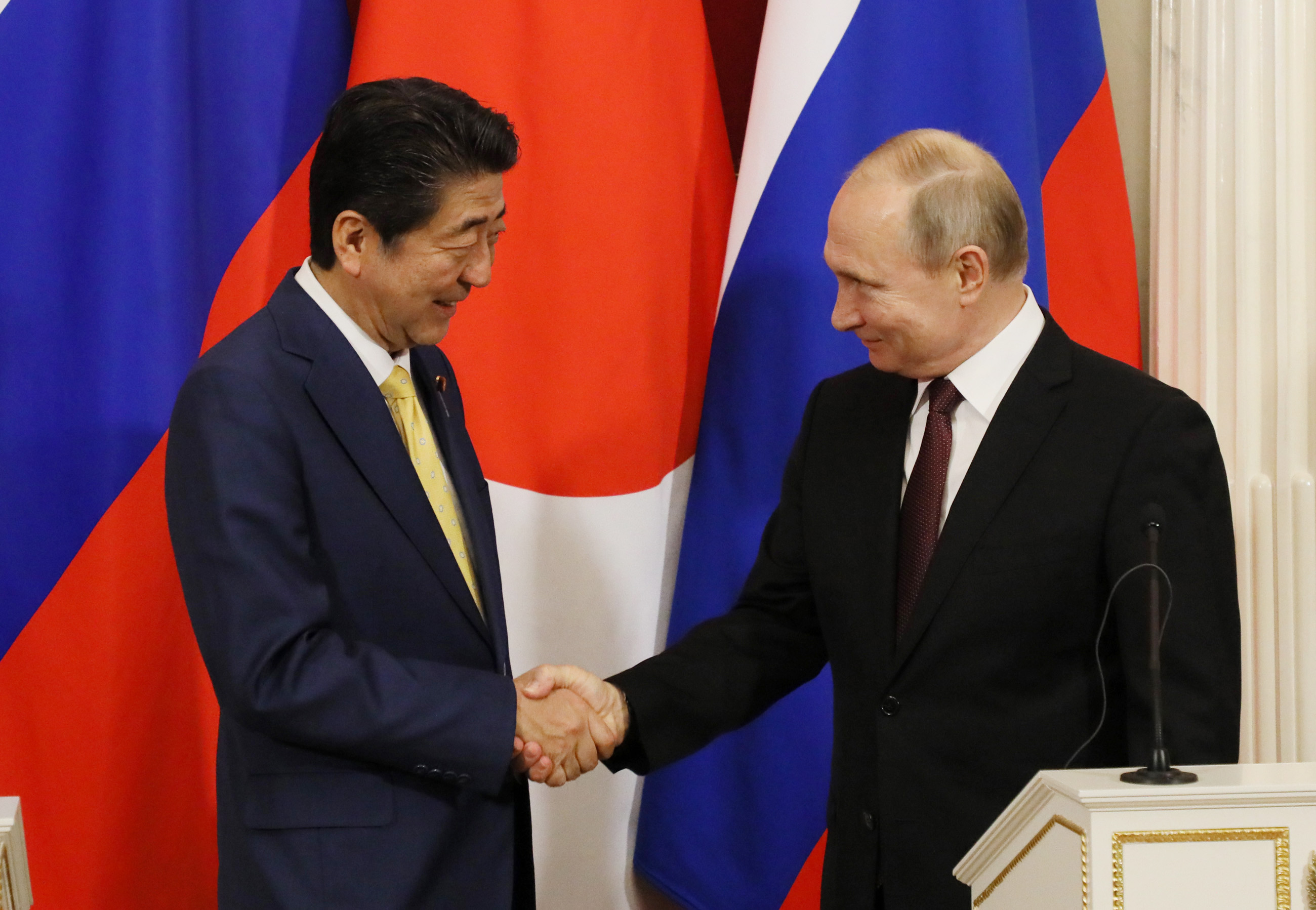
Abe with Russian President Vladimir Putin in January 2019

Writing of what he characterizes as the most serious failure of the Abe administration, co-director of the Institute of Contemporary Japanese Studies of Temple University in Japan Robert Dujarric, wrote: "The election of Donald Trump raised existential questions about the reliability of Washington as a guarantor of Tokyo's security. The events of January 6th… reflected the fact that a substantial number of Republican voters believe that Trump had won the election and appeared to endorse his supporters' use of lethal violence to keep him in the White House, which was indeed very worrisome for the Japanese. Yet neither Abe's Japan nor for that matter any country that relies on the US as the ultimate guarantor of its security—South Korea, Taiwan, or all of NATO—took any significant steps to buttress their military to prepare for the day when the Americans might not be able to come to their rescue. That is also true for their diplomacy, economic policies, and other components of national security. For this, however, it is hard to blame Abe alone. Japanese voters would have had no interest in such a course of action, which would have entailed major costs."

Japan's relations with South Korea further deteriorated starting from 2018, when, while negotiating a "comfort women" deal with then South Korean president Moon Jae-in, Abe demanded that South Korea remove statues of comfort women that had been installed in South Korea, the United States, Australia, and Germany. In late 2018, the Supreme Court of Korea and other high courts ordered several Japanese companies, including Mitsubishi Heavy Industries, Nachi-Fujikoshi, and Nippon Steel, to make compensations to the families of Koreans who were unfairly treated and illegally forced to supply labor for World War II war efforts. The Japanese government protested these decisions, Abe argued that any issues concerning Japan's rule of Korea were previously resolved in the Treaty on Basic Relations Between Japan and the Republic of Korea which normalized relations between Japan and South Korea, adding that further requests of reparations meant that South Korea had violated the treaty. In August 2019, Abe's cabinet approved the removal of South Korea from Japan's trade "whitelist"; the subsequent trade dispute between South Korea and Japan is still ongoing and has caused a significant deterioration in Japan–South Korea relations.

=== Economic policy ===
In July 2018, Japan became the second country after Mexico to ratify the Comprehensive and Progressive Agreement for Trans-Pacific Partnership (CPTPP). CPTPP evolved from the Trans-Pacific Partnership which never came into force after then US president Donald Trump withdrew the United States from the agreement in early 2017. Abe's administration was credited with overcoming protectionist pressures within Japan and rallying the 10 other TPP member countries to support CPTPP, which largely kept the previous agreement intact and left the door open to an eventual US return.

=== Whaling ===
In 2019, Japan resumed commercial whaling, for the first time in 31 years, a day after withdrawing from the International Whaling Commission (IWC). The district Abe hailed from and represented includes a major whaling center and he long pushed to resume commercial whaling.

=== Resignation ===
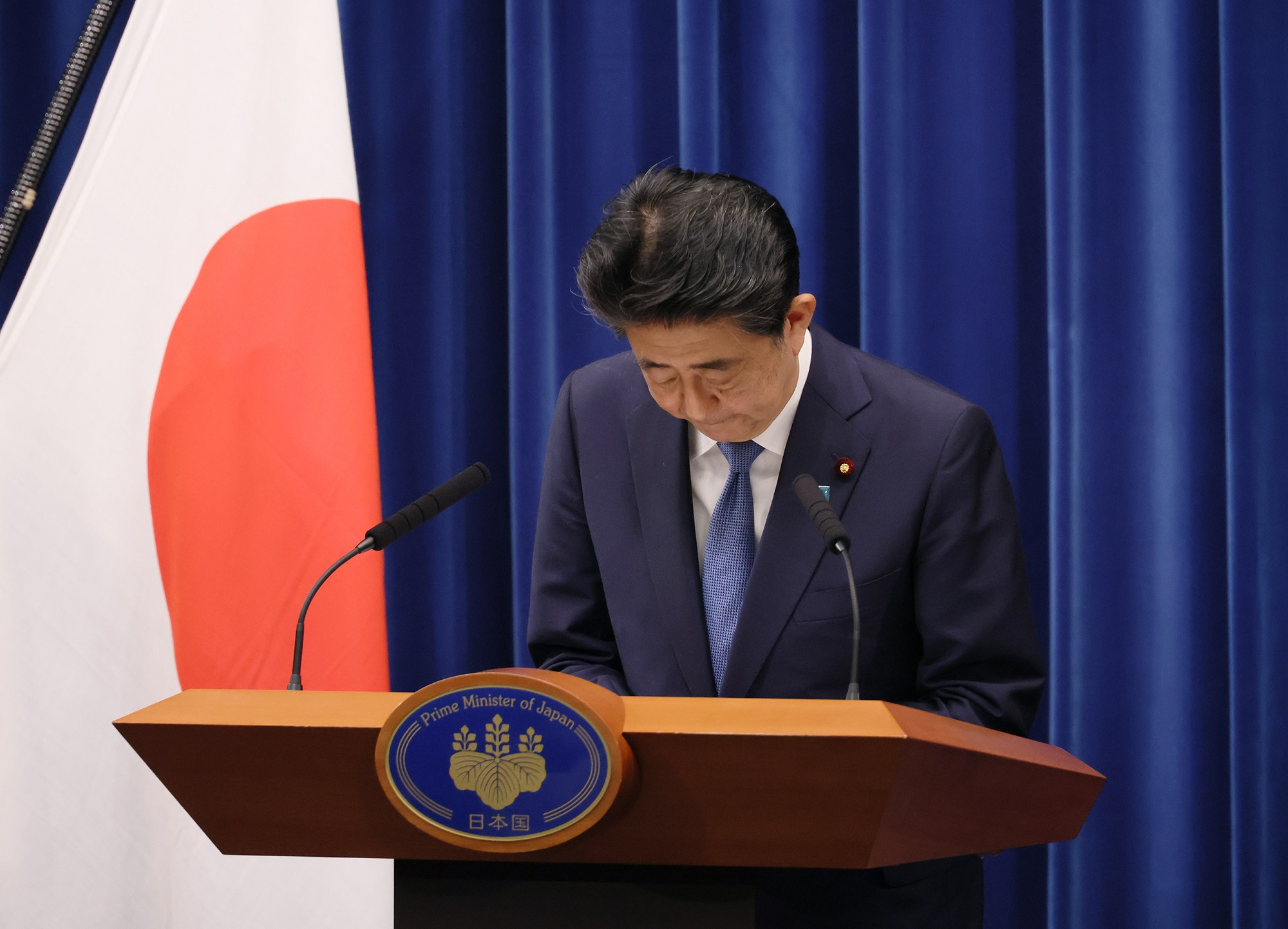
Abe bowing after announcing his resignation during a press conference in Tokyo, August 2020

Abe's colitis relapsed in June 2020 and resulted in his health deteriorating through the summer. Following several hospital visits, Abe announced on 28 August 2020 that he intended to retire as prime minister, citing his inability to carry out the duties of the office while seeking treatment for his condition. During the press conference announcing his retirement, Abe indicated that he would remain in office until a successor was chosen by the LDP, but declined to endorse any specific successor. Abe expressed regret at being unable to fully accomplish his policy goals due to his early retirement. Chief cabinet secretary Yoshihide Suga was elected as his successor by the LDP on 14 September 2020 and took office as prime minister on 16 September. In retirement, Abe was not as active as before. He continued to give interviews sporadically, such as the career retrospective on 19 July 2021, he gave to H.R. McMaster of the Hoover Institute.
