= Security Council (disambiguation) =

The United Nations Security Council is the organ charged with maintaining peace and security among nations.

Security Council may also refer to:

- Security Council of Abkhazia
- Security Council of Armenia
- Security Council of Azerbaijan
- Security Council of Belarus
- Security Council of Japan, a former ministry of Japan
- Security Council of Kazakhstan
- Security Council of Kyrgyzstan
- Security Council of the Russian Federation, a security affairs consultative body of the Russian Federation
- Security Council of the Soviet Union, an organ of the former USSR in charge of enforcing defense policies
- Security Council of Tajikistan

== See also ==
- National security council, a list
- Security Council, a fictional international council from the browser game NationStates
