= National security council =

Body coordinating national security policy

A national security council (NSC) is usually an executive branch governmental body responsible for coordinating policy on national security issues and advising chief executives on matters related to national security. An NSC is often headed by a national security advisor and staffed with senior-level officials from military, diplomatic, intelligence, law enforcement and other governmental bodies. The functions and responsibilities of an NSC at the strategic state level are different from those of the United Nations Security Council, which is more of a diplomatic forum.

Occasionally a nation will be ruled by a similarly named body, such as "the National Security Committee" or "Council for National Security". These bodies are often a result of the establishment or preservation of a military dictatorship (or some other national crisis), do not always have statutory approval, and are usually intended to have transitory or provisional powers. See also: coup d'état.

Some nations may have a similar body which is not formally part of the executive government. For example, the National Security Commission in China is an organ of the Chinese Communist Party (CCP), the sole ruling party, and headed by the CCP general secretary, rather than an organ of the executive government.

== NSCs by country ==
- Abkhazia: Security Council
- Algeria: High Council of Security
- Antigua and Barbuda: National Security Council
- Armenia: Security Council of Armenia
- Australia: National Security Committee
- Austria: National Security Council
- Azerbaijan: Security Council
- Bangladesh: National Committee on Security Affairs
- Belarus: Security Council
- Belgium: National Security Council
- Brazil: National Defense Council
- Canada: Canadian National Security Council
- Chile: National Security Council
- China: National Security Commission of the Chinese Communist Party
  - Hong Kong: Committee for Safeguarding National Security of Hong Kong
- Croatia: National Security Council
- Cyprus: National Security Council
- Czech Republic: National Security Council of the Czech Republic
- Denmark: Government Security Council
- East Germany: National Defense Council of East Germany
- Egypt: National Security Council
- Estonia: National Defence Council
- Fiji: National Security Council
- Finland: Ministerial Committee on Foreign and Security Policy
- France: Defence and National Security Council
- Georgia: National Security Council of Georgia
- Germany: National Security Council, German: Nationaler Sicherheitsrat
- Greece: Government Council for National Security
- Ghana: National Security Council
- Hungary: National Defense Council
- India: National Security Council
- Indonesia: National Defense Council, before 2024 was known as National Resilience Council
- Islamic Republic of Iran: Supreme National Security Council
- Iraq: National Security Council
  - Kurdistan: Security Council
- Republic of Ireland: National Security Committee
- Israel: Ministerial Committee on National Security Affairs (policy co-ordination functions); National Security Council (advisory functions)
- Italy: Supreme Council of Defence
- Japan: National Security Council (previously Security Council)
- Kazakhstan: Security Council of Kazakhstan
- North Korea: State Affairs Commission of North Korea (previously National Defense Commission)
- South Korea: National Security Council
- Kyrgyzstan: Security Council
- Lithuania: State Defence Council
- Malaysia: National Security Division (policy co-ordination functions); National Security Council (advisory functions)
- Moldova: National Security Council
- Mongolia: National Security Council of Mongolia
- Myanmar: National Defence and Security Council
- New Zealand: Cabinet National Security Committee
- Nigeria: National Security Council (intelligence services); National Defense Council (Nigerian Armed Forces)
- Oman: Palace Office (Oman)
- Pakistan: National Security Council
- State of Palestine: Palestinian National Security Council
- Philippines: National Security Council
- Poland: National Security Council
- Portugal: Superior Council of National Defense
- Romania: Supreme Council of National Defense
- Russia: Security Council of the Russian Federation
- Saudi Arabia: Council of Political and Security Affairs (previously National Security Council)
- Serbia: National Security Council of the Republic of Serbia
- Singapore: National Security Coordination Secretariat
- Slovenia: National Security Council
- Slovak Republic: Security Council
- South Africa: National Intelligence Co-ordinating Committee
- Spain: National Security Council
- Sri Lanka: National Security Council of Sri Lanka
- Syria: National Security Council
- Sweden: National Security Council
- Taiwan (Republic of China): National Security Council
- Tajikistan: Security Council
- Thailand: National Security Council
- Turkey: National Security Council
- Turkmenistan: State Security Council
- Ukraine: National Security and Defense Council of Ukraine
- United Kingdom: National Security Council
- United States: United States National Security Council
- Uzbekistan: National Security Council under the President of Uzbekistan
- Vietnam: Council for National Defense and Security

== See also ==
- Privy council
- Council of State
- Executive council (Commonwealth countries)
- Central Military Commission
- Israeli war cabinet
- Defence Council of the United Kingdom
