= Security Council of the Slovak Republic =

Advisory body for Slovakian government

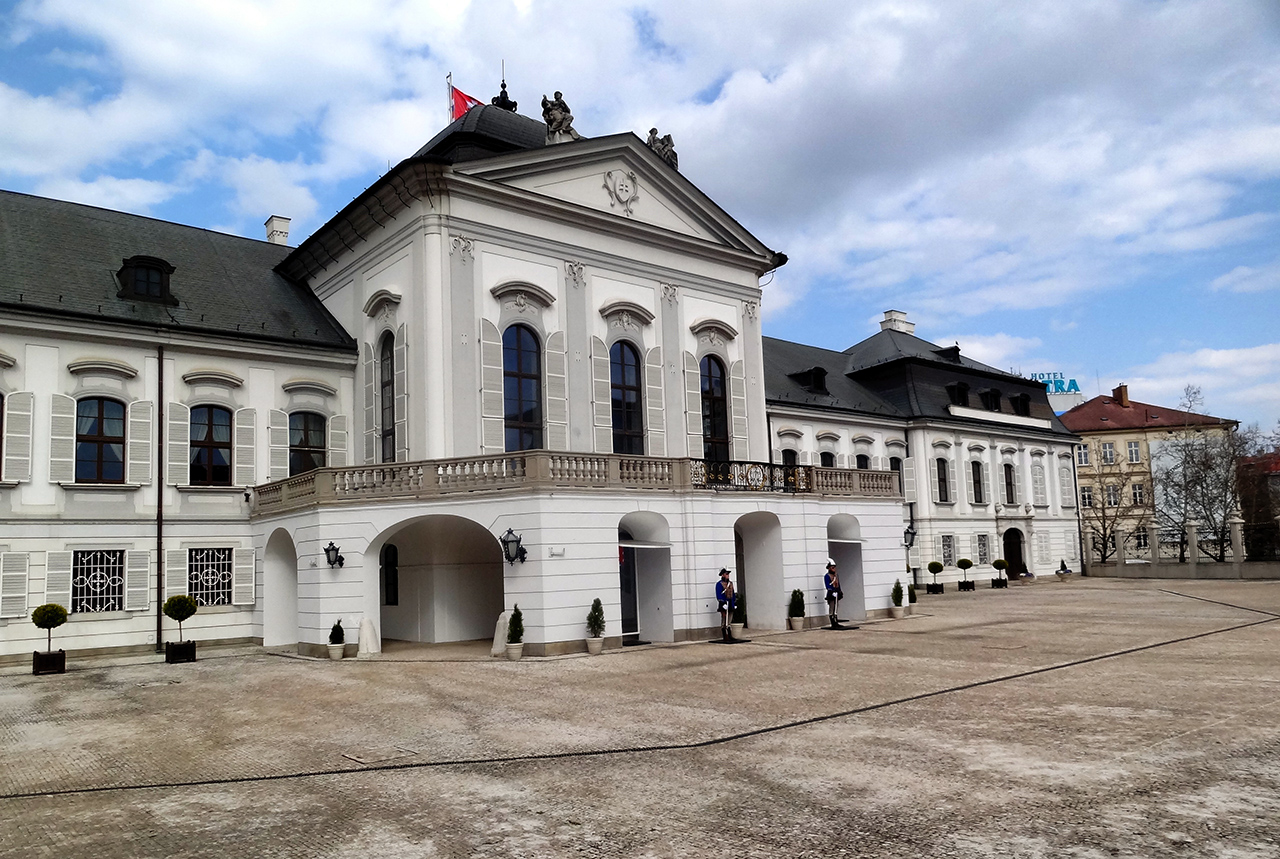
Grassalkovich Palace is the current meeting place of the SRB.

The Security Council of the Slovak Republic (Bezpečnostná rada Slovenskej republiky, SRB) is the advisory body of the Government of the Slovak Republic, which is involved in the development and implementation of the security system and military policy of the country. It prepares proposals for the government to take measures to safeguard the security of the country, to prevent crisis situations, as well as proposals for solving the crisis situation. The Security Council of the SRB currently has 9 permanent members, with the acting prime minister being the chairman.

== Membership ==
- Prime Minister of Slovakia (Chairman)
- Deputy Prime Ministers
- Minister of Defence
- Minister of the Interior
- Minister of Finance
- Minister of Foreign and European Affairs

== Structure ==
The SR BR establishes the following committees to prepare and fulfill its tasks:

- Foreign Policy Committee
- Defense Planning Committee
- Civil Emergency Planning Committee
- Intelligence Coordination Committee

== See also ==
- Armed Forces of Slovakia
- President of Slovakia
- Security Council (disambiguation)
