= State Secrecy Law =

The State Secrecy Law, officially the Act on the Protection of Specially Designated Secrets (SDS) (特定秘密の保護に関する法律, Tokutei Himitsu no Hogo ni kansuru Hōritsu), Act No. 108 of 2013, is a law in Japan allowing the government to designate defense and other sensitive information as "special secrets" that are protected from public disclosure.

== History ==
Prior to the passage of the SSL, incidents where espionage cases involving hostile foreign intelligence agencies were handled through use of other laws such as the Passport or SDF Law.

An attempt was made to pass an anti-espionage law during the administration of Yasuhiro Nakasone in 1985. Concerns were raised on how whether human rights will be violated and whether there is a balance between public interest and the necessity of protecting state secrets. No law was passed due to outcry from the opposition due to the negative legacy of the Kempeitai.

Proposed by the second Abe cabinet, the law was approved by the Security Council on October 25, 2013, then was submitted to the National Diet, before being approved there as well on December 6 the same year. The law was promulgated on December 13, 2013, and came into force one year later.

On December 24, 2022, the JMSDF Criminal Investigation Command (CIC) investigated the first breach of the SSL after a captain was charged for leaking classified information. Among the information that was illegally disclosed included intelligence acquired by American military forces to a former JMSDF admiral, who said that classified information should not be disclosed to him.

Captain Takashi Inoue was dismissed from the JMSDF. At the time of his dismissal, Captain Inoue was posted at the JMSDF Command and Staff College.

On January 19, 2023, the leaks reported included information on Chinese ships in Japanese territorial waters.

On April 27, 2023, violations of the SSL were reported with officers in the JMSDF and the JGSDF for failing to ensure lower-ranked personnel have received appropriate clearances.

== Overview ==
The Japanese secrecy law covers defense, diplomacy, public safety and counter-terrorism. In addition, it allows the government to lock away government documents for 60 years. Civil servants leaking information can expect ten years incarceration while journalists and other civilians helping them would get five years.

=== Process ===
Before SDS was launched, the Abe cabinet established the National Security Council (NSC) on December 4, 2013. The Abe cabinet explained that SDS and the Japanese NSC should work together.

Public comment were heard from July 24, 2014, to August 24, 2014.

The government announced that SDS would come into force on December 10, 2014.

=== Designation of Special Secret ===
The head of an administrative organ shall designate as Specially Designated Secrets

1. information of the types listed below
2. which is kept undisclosed
3. which requires special secrecy because unauthorized disclosure thereof would cause severe damage to the national security of Japan

==== Types of information ====
- Item (i) Defense *Equivalent to the Appended Table 4 of the Self-Defense Forces (SDF) Law

(a) Operation of the Self-Defense Forces or thereto relevant assessments, plans or research

(b) Signal or imagery information, and other important information collected in relation to defense

(c) Collection and organization of information listed in (b) or the capacity to do so

(d) Assessments, plans or research pertaining to development of defense capability

(e) Type or quantity of weapons, ammunition, aircraft and other material for defense use

(f) Structure of communications network and means of communications for defense use

(g) Cryptology for defense use

(h) Specifications, performance or usage of weapons, ammunition, aircraft or other material for defense use including those at the R&D stage

(i) Methods of production, inspection, repair or examination of weapons, ammunition, aircraft and other material for defense use including those at the R&D stage

(j) Design, performance or internal use of facilities for defense use

- Item (ii) Foreign Affairs

(a) Among policy or contents of negotiations or cooperation with foreign governments or international organizations, those pertaining to the protection of lives and bodies of people, territorial integrity and other issues deemed important to national security

(b) Measures including embargoes on imports or exports that Japan carries out for national security purposes or thereto relevant policies

(c) Important information collected regarding the protection of the lives and bodies of people, territorial integrity, or the peace and security of the international community, or information that requires protection under international agreements including treaties related to national security

(d) Collection and organization of information listed in (c) or the capacity to do so

(e) Cryptology for diplomatic use, including communications between the Ministry of Foreign Affairs and Japanese diplomatic establishments

- Item (iii) Prevention of Designated Harmful Activities (e.g. Counterintelligence)

(a) Measures to prevent Designated Harmful Activities or thereto relevant plans or research

(b) Important information collected on the protection of lives and bodies of people, or information collected from foreign governments or international organizations in relation to prevention of Designated Harmful Activities

(c) Collection and organization of information listed in (b) or the capacity to do so

(d) Cryptology used for prevention of Designated Harmful Activities

- Item (iv) Prevention of Terrorism

(a) Measures to prevent terrorism or thereto relevant plans or research

(b) Important information collected on the protection of lives and bodies of people, or information collected from foreign governments or international organizations in relation to prevention of terrorism

(c) Collection and organization of information listed in (b) or the capacity to do so

(d) Cryptology used for prevention of terrorism

=== Security clearance ===
Access to SDS shall be limited to government personnel, employees of Government of Japan contractors and prefectural police officers who, following the security clearance process, are identified as not risking unauthorized disclosure of SDS.

=== Penalty ===
- Unauthorized disclosure of SDS shall be punished when intentionally or negligently committed by:
  - Those handling SDS as part of their ok

Intentional: Imprisonment for not more than 10 years
By negligence: Imprisonment for not more than 2 years or fine of not more than 500,000 yen

- Those receiving and thus knowing SDS from an administrative organ for the sake of the public interest Intentional: Imprisonment for not more than 5 years

By negligence: Imprisonment for not more than 1 year or fine of not more than 300,000 yen

- Acquisition of SDS through the following acts to serve the interests of foreign countries, etc. shall be punished by imprisonment for not more than 10 years:

(1) Fraud, assault or intimidation; (2) Theft; (3) Intrusion on relevant facilities; (4) Eavesdropping on wired telecommunications; (5) Unauthorized access; (6) Any other act excluding (2) to (5) that undermines control of SDS holders.

- Those who attempt, conspire to effect, instigate or incite intentional leakage or acquisition of SDS through the acts listed above shall be punished.

== Reactions ==
About 80% of the Japanese population had opposed the law. Reporters Without Borders called the law "an unprecedented threat to freedom of information". Critics claim that the law is vague on what constitutes a "state secret" and represents a return to pre-WW II militarism when the Peace Preservation Law was used to stifle political opposition. They also contend that the law undermines basic democratic freedom and makes the administration "the judge, jury, and enforcer" in the matter. There have also been claims that the law has led to an "increase in self-control and even self-censorship in the reporting of issues that do not correspond to the government’s political direction."

The law was hailed by the American ambassador, Caroline Kennedy, and was seen as a victory for the United States government that had pressured Shinzo Abe and his government to control classified information more tightly. In the decades before, the 1952 Special Criminal Act and the 1954 United States Mutual Security Act Secrets Protection Law protected military equipment that the U. S. provided for Japan. With the "War on Terror" and the challenges by China and North Korea and a number of events where military security was breached by Japan, it was argued that the government established the law to strengthen its relationship in the context of its partnership with the United States.

In a 2016 assessment of the impact of the law, Aditi Razdan indicated that while the law may have a chilling effect on the media, the extent of this is difficult to measure, as "[w]hen a state secret itself is not defined, it is nearly impossible to determine what media outlets can no longer report on." In the annual ranking of global press freedom Reporters Without Borders lowered Japan from the 11th place in 2010 to the 72nd place in 2016 because of the law about "state secrets".

== See also ==
- Alien and Sedition Acts in the United States
