= Central Military Commission =

Central Military Commission may refer to:

- Central Military Commission (China), the highest national defense organization in the People's Republic of China.
- Central Military Commission of the Communist Party of Vietnam, the highest body in Vietnam on military policy and heads the People's Army of Vietnam (PVAN).
- Central Military Commission of the Workers' Party of Korea, an organ of the Central Committee of the Workers' Party of Korea.

== See also ==
- Civilian control of the military in communist states
