= First premiership of Shinzo Abe =

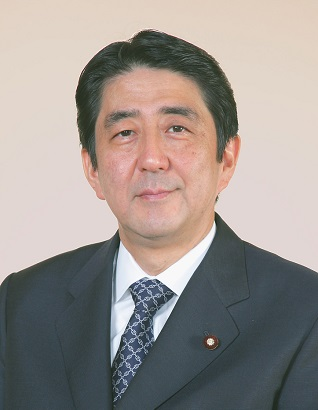
- First Premiership of Shinzo Abe; 26 September 2006 – 26 September 2007
- Monarch: Akihito
- Cabinet: First Abe cabinet
- Party: Liberal Democratic
- Seat: Naikaku Sōri Daijin Kantei
- Constituency: Yamaguchi 4th
- Emblem of the Government of Japan

Shinzo Abe's first tenure as prime minister of Japan began on 26 September 2006 when he was officially appointed prime minister by Emperor Akihito in a ceremony at the Tokyo Imperial Palace. In 2007, he initiated the Quadrilateral Security Dialogue with the US, Australia, and India, aimed at resisting China's rise as a superpower. He resigned as premier that year due to his government's unpopularity and illness.

== First Cabinet (2006–2007) ==
On 26 September 2006, Abe was inaugurated as Japanese prime minister. Elected at age 52, he was the youngest prime minister since Fumimaro Konoe in 1941. He was also the first prime minister born after World War II. Abe's first cabinet was announced on 26 September 2006. The only minister retained in his position from the previous Koizumi cabinet was Foreign Minister Tarō Asō, who had been one of Abe's competitors for the LDP presidency. In addition to the cabinet positions existing under Koizumi, Abe created five new "advisor" positions. He reshuffled his cabinet on 27 August 2007. Commentators noted that these changes seemed to be an effort by Abe to organize the Prime Minister's office into something more akin to the White House.

The New York Times observed that his cabinet appeared to place a larger emphasis on foreign policy and national security instead of domestic concerns like economic policy. It also speculated that Abe's primary goal may have been to revise the pacifist constitution.

=== Domestic policy ===
Abe expressed a general commitment to the reforms instituted by his predecessor, Junichiro Koizumi. He took some steps toward balancing the Japanese budget, such as appointing a tax policy expert, Kōji Omi, as minister of finance. Omi previously supported increases in the national consumption tax, although Abe distanced himself from this policy and sought to achieve much of his budget-balancing through spending cuts. He started using the term "re-challenge" (再チャレンジ), emphasizing the need to give all Japanese second chances to succeed. Accordingly, Abe convened an advisory council to draft reforms to promote new opportunities for the disadvantaged. Lawmakers close to Abe, led by Yoshihide Suga, launched the Parliamentary League in Support of Re-Challenge. On 23 October 2006, Abe stated he was looking for some LDP members who were expelled for opposing Koizumi's privatization of Japan Post back to the party, which caused a decline in his popularity. Eventually, Abe sought a compromise by requiring those who were expelled that want to return to sign loyalty pledges.

Since 1997, as the bureau chief of the "Institute of Junior Assembly Members Who Think About the Outlook of Japan and History Education", Abe supported the controversial Japanese Society for History Textbook Reform and the New History Textbook. In March 2007, Abe, along with right-wing politicians, proposed a bill to encourage nationalism and a "love for one's country and hometown" among the Japanese youth (specific wording from the revised "Fundamental Law of Education" 教育基本法, which was revised to include "love of country").

In March 2007, Abe stated that there was no evidence that the Japanese military had forced women into sexual slavery during World War II, which the Japanese government had admitted and apologized for in the 1992 Kono Statement. Responding to a potential motion by the US Congress encouraging Japan to acknowledge the atrocity, Abe stated that the Japanese government would not apologize again. Abe held conservative views in the Japanese succession controversy. Shortly after the birth of Prince Hisahito of Akishino, he abandoned a proposed legislative amendment to permit women to inherit the Chrysanthemum Throne.

=== Foreign policy ===
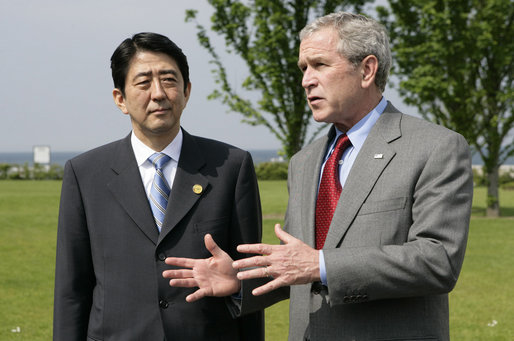
Abe with United States president George W. Bush at the G8 summit in Heiligendamm, Germany, 2007

==== North Korea ====
Abe generally took a hard-line stance on North Korea, especially regarding the North Korean abductions of Japanese citizens. In 2002 negotiations between Japan and North Korea, Prime Minister Koizumi and general secretary Kim Jong-il agreed to give abductees permission to visit Japan. A few weeks into the visit, the Japanese government decided that the abductees would be restricted from returning to North Korea where their families live. Abe took credit for this policy decision in his bestselling book, Towards a Beautiful Nation (美しい国へ, Utsukushii kuni e). North Korea criticized this Japanese decision as a breach of a diplomatic promise, and the negotiations were aborted.

==== East and Southeast Asia ====
Abe publicly recognized the need for improved relations with China and, along with Foreign Minister Tarō Asō, sought an eventual summit meeting with General Secretary of the Chinese Communist Party and Chinese president Hu Jintao. Abe also said that China–Japan relations should not continue to be based on "emotions".

Abe was respected among some politicians in the Republic of China (ROC, Taiwan), most notably those who are part of the Pan-Green Coalition seeking Taiwanese independence. Chen Shui-bian welcomed Abe's ministership. Part of Abe's appeal in Taiwan was historical; his grandfather Nobusuke Kishi was an anti-communist who supported Chiang Kai-shek's government after the government retreated to the island, and his great-uncle Eisaku Satō was the last prime minister to visit Taiwan while in office.

Abe expressed the need to strengthen political, security, and economic ties with Southeast Asian countries. Although China is not within the Southeast Asian region, Japan has also sought its support. However, relations with China and the ROC continue to be tarnished by the Senkaku Islands dispute and Abe's visits to the Yasukuni Shrine.

==== India ====
Abe, in his four terms as the prime minister of Japan, sought to upgrade the strategic Japan–India relationship. Abe initiated the Quadrilateral Security Dialogue between Japan, the United States, Australia, and India in 2007, which was seen as a counter to China's rising power. His three-day visit to India in August 2007 inaugurated a new bilateral Asian alliance, building on the long history of friendly bilateral relations between India and Japan. Abe's initiative was to establish the "fifth" bilateral link in an emerging scenario, whereby, the US–Australia, US–Japan, Japan–Australia, and the US–India links are supportive strategic alignments. A sixth link of India-Australia would be the logical corollary, formalized as a new quadrilateral of a strategic bulwark. The eventual expansion to include Vietnam, South Korea, the Philippines, and Indonesia in this arrangement has been speculated in the media of those states. Chinese strategic experts have labeled the evolving geo-strategic paradigm, the "Asian NATO". Abe's pragmatic India foreign policy was to boost Japan's resurgent economic indicators while gaining a crucial partner in Asia.

=== Defense ===
Abe sought to revise or broaden the interpretation of Article 9 of the Japanese Constitution in order to permit Japan to maintain de jure military forces. He stated that "we are reaching the limit in narrowing down differences between Japan's security and the interpretation of our constitution". During his first period as prime minister, he upgraded the Japan Defense Agency to full ministry status. Like his predecessors, he supported the Japanese alliance with the United States. Abe supported the US-led Iraq War.

=== Resignation ===
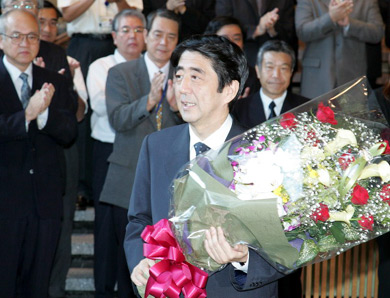
Abe resigned as prime minister in September 2007 (pictured).

In the lead-up to the July election, Abe's Agriculture Minister Toshikatsu Matsuoka committed suicide following a series of political funding scandals. He was the first cabinet member to commit suicide since World War II. Abe's ruling Liberal Democratic Party suffered great losses in the upper house election, losing control for the first time in 52 years. Agricultural minister, Norihiko Akagi, involved in a political funding scandal, resigned after the election. Additionally, Abe's rejection of a possible female Japanese monarch, which led to the Japanese succession controversy, diminished his support base. In an attempt to revive his administration, Abe announced a new cabinet in August 2007. Support for Abe rose by 10 percent as a result; however, the new agricultural minister Takehiko Endo, involved in a finance scandal, resigned only seven days later.

On 12 September 2007, only three days after a new parliamentary session had begun, Abe announced his intention to resign his position as prime minister at an unscheduled press conference. The announcement came just minutes before opposition leaders were scheduled to question him in Parliament and shocked many. Abe had described himself as a "politician who fights" and previously pledged not to resign. Abe explained that his unpopularity was hindering the passage of an anti-terrorism law, involving among other things Japan's continued military presence in Afghanistan. Party officials also said the embattled prime minister was suffering from poor health.
