= Security Council of Japan =

The Security Council of Japan (Japanese: 安全保障会議, romanized: Anzen-Hoshō-Kaigi) was the nine-person national security council which advises the prime minister on national security and the military and deals with a wide spectrum of issues which indirectly affect Japan's broader interests, including basic national defense policy, the National Defense Program Outline, the outline on coordinating industrial production and other matters related to the National Defense Program Outline, including decisions on diplomatic initiatives and defense operations.

Like its predecessor, the National Defense Council, the SC had problems with its mandate, structure, secretariat and functions, but it was considered an improvement for its ability to coordinate with parts of the Japanese governments by conducting half a dozen meetings frequently.

== History ==
The Security Council of Japan was formed to correct the shortcomings of its predecessor, the National Defense Council (NDC). The NDC was established in 1956 as Japan's first post‑war institution for coordinating national security policy. It was designed to serve as a deliberative body to ensure civilian oversight of defense policy and prevent the formation of autonomous military authority. The NDC was established under the Defense Agency Establishment Act (1954) and the Act for the Formation of the NDC (1956) as an advisory body of five cabinet ministers: the Prime Minister, Minister of Foreign Affairs, Minister of Finance, Deputy‑General of the Defense Agency, and Director‑General of the Economic Planning Agency. The primary purpose of the council was to ensure "careful deliberation for the sake of civilian control" of the newly created Japanese Self‑Defense Force.

The NDC did not allow former members of the Imperial Military or the JSDF to participate as part of post‑war demilitarization. Despite this, the NDC soon became criticized for its inefficiency and lack of coordination between ministries, notably between the Defense Agency, the Foreign Ministry, and the Cabinet Secretariat. Several proposals attempted to strengthen civilian control and inter‑ministerial coordination; however, none were enacted.

In the 1980s, there were many attempts to reform the national security policy apparatus. The two most prominent were undertaken by Prime‑Minister Yasuhiro Nakasone. After several high‑profile counter‑intelligence failures, Nakasone submitted the so‑called "Spy Prevention Act" to the Diet in June 1985. The bill was withdrawn after eight months due to political and public opposition, including street demonstrations. Around the same time, the Second Ad Hoc Commission on Administrative Reform (1982) and the Ad Hoc Administrative Reform Promotion Council (1985) had proposed reorganizing or replacing the NDC, leading the way for the SCJ.

Nakasone succeeded the following year, establishing the Security Council (SCJ) on July 1, 1986. The newly created Security Council assumed the responsibilities of the NDC alongside additional responsibilities for the management of grave emergencies, defined as situations other than national defense that may seriously affect the safety of Japan, with the notable exclusion of economic crises and natural disasters, as they could be handled under existing systems. The SCJ expanded the NDC council from five to seven members, adding both the Chief Cabinet Secretary and the Chairman of the National Public Safety Commission.

In the 1990s, efforts increased to reform the crisis‑management function of the SCJ following major incidents such as the Great Hanshin–Awaji Earthquake and the sarin gas attack on Tokyo subways in 1995. These incidents exposed major flaws in Japan's fragmented crisis management system, particularly in the lack of clear lines of authority and inter‑ministerial coordination, both of which hindered rapid response. Following two reports presented in 1997, the Cabinet Act was revised to establish the Deputy Chief Cabinet Secretary for Crisis Management (DCCS‑CM) within the Cabinet Secretariat. This establishment of the DCCS‑CM was designed to have a dedicated official to make early judgments on the necessary measures to be taken by the Cabinet in response to an emergency and to coordinate among relevant ministries and agencies. This marked a shift from handling only "grave emergencies" to general crisis management. The reforms marked a broader shift in Japan's security policy, as crisis management came to encompass not only military or national defence emergencies but also non‑traditional threats such as terrorism, natural disasters, and pandemics.

The recommendations of the Administrative Reform Council led to the reorganization of several central government ministries and agencies in January 2001. This reform resulted in the strengthening of the crisis‑management function of the Cabinet's staff and organization. This reorganisation resulted in the Cabinet Security Affairs Office being first reformed into the Cabinet Office for National Security Affairs and Crisis Management, then later into the Assistant Chief Cabinet Secretary for National Security and Crisis Management.

During his first prime‑ministership, Shinzo Abe chaired an advisory panel to discuss strengthening the security functions of the Prime Minister's Office. This discussion was built upon the 2003 and 2006 revisions of the SCJ Act, adding responsibilities for responses to armed attacks and JSDF international cooperation. The culmination of decades of reform efforts resulted in the SCJ being reorganized into the National Security Council (Japan) (NSC) in 2013, addressing many of the structural weaknesses present in the SCJ.

== Criticisms ==
Many critics have persistently argued that the SCJ, as a national security apparatus, does not have the capability to take quick, decisive, and centralized action as necessary to handle a crisis. The Prime Minister, while usually the source of authority in a similar national security council, lacked the power necessary to take decisive action without seeking consensus among relevant actors first. This appeared to be a deliberate choice as to preserve civilian control and prevent the centralization of authority.

== Membership ==
The Security Council was presided over by the Prime Minister and includes the Ministers of State who were specified in advance under Article 9 of the Cabinet Law; the Foreign Minister, the Finance Minister, the Chief Cabinet Secretary, the Minister for Defense, the Chairman of the National Public Safety Commission, and the Director General of the Economic Planning Agency.

The Chairman of the Security Council may invite the Chairman of the Joint Staff Council or another relevant State Minister or Official to attend meetings.
